= List of Chetnik voivodes =

This is a list of Chetnik voivodes. Voivode (Slavic languages for 'war-leader' / 'war-lord') is a Slavic as well as Romanian title that originally denoted the principal commander of a military force. It derives from the word vojevoda, which in early Slavic meant the bellidux, i.e. the military commander of an area, but it usually had a greater meaning. Among the first modern-day voivodes was Kole Rašić, a late 19th-century Serb revolutionary and guerrilla fighter, who led a cheta of 300 men between Niš and Leskovac in Ottoman areas during the Serbo-Turkish War (1876–1878). The others were Rista Cvetković-Božinče, Čerkez Ilija, Čakr-paša, and Spiro Crne. Jovan Hadži-Vasiljević, who knew Spiro Crne personally, wrote and published his biography, Spiro Crne Golemdžiojski, in 1933.

== Commanders of Old Serbia and Macedonia (1903–1912), Balkan Wars ==
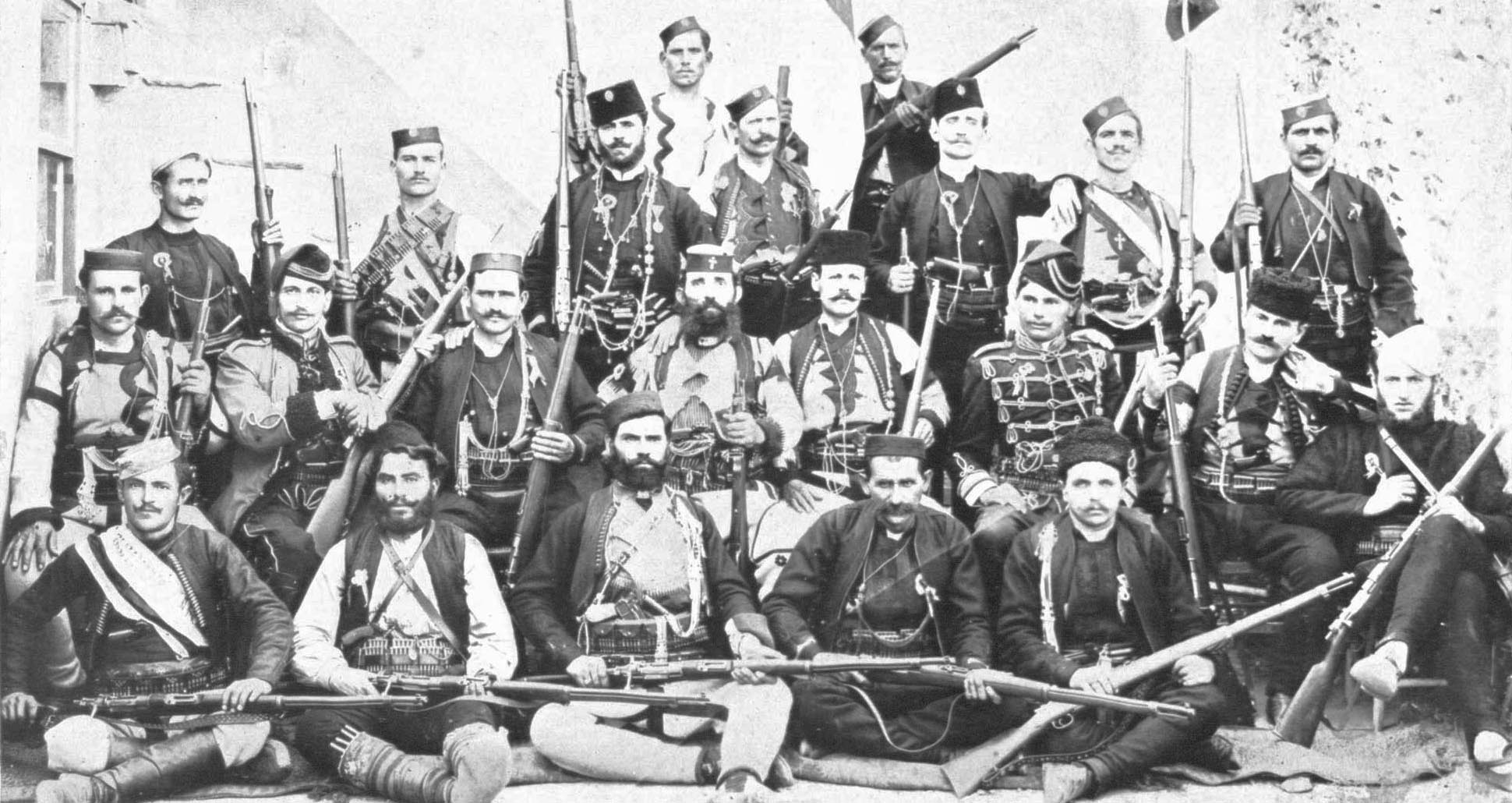
Chetnik commanders in 1908

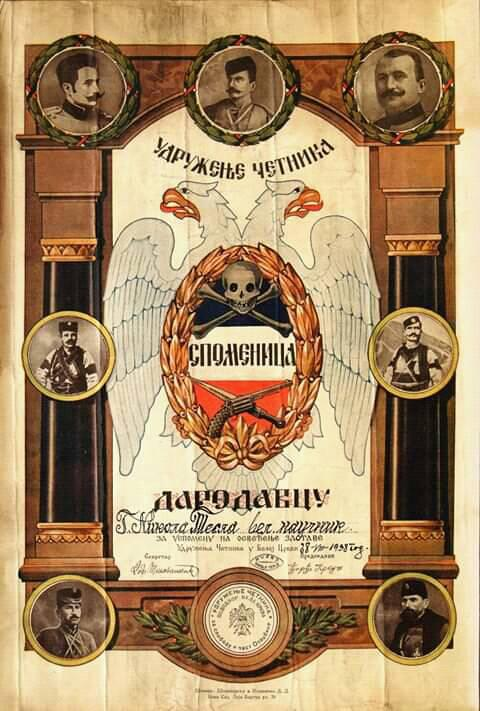
Nikola Tesla's honorary Chetnik diploma, awarded to him for many donations and comprehensive assistance throughout the years (1938)

- Jovan Atanacković
- Mihailo Ristić (diplomat)
- Svetislav Simić
- Denko Krstić
- Dimitrije Dimitrijević (Chetnik)
- Nikola Omoranski
- Rista Ognjanović
- Cene Marković
- Zivojin Balugdzic
- Atanasije Petrovic Tasko
- Anta Todorovic
- Jovan Cakic
- Mihailo Suskalovic
- Kosta Milovanović-Pećanac
- Jovan Stojković-Babunski
- Vojislav Tankosić-Voja
- Lazar Kujundžić-Klempa (Velika Hoča)
- Savatije Milošević (Velika Hoča)
- Živojin Milovanović (Velika Hoča)
- Pavle Mladenović-Čiča (1905)
- Aksentije Bacetović-Baceta (1905)
- Ljuba Jezdić-Razvigora
- Borko Paštrović
- Naum Markovic
- Doksim Mihailović
- Ilija Jovanović-Pčinjski
- Mihailo Ristić-Džervinac
- Jovan Dovezenski
- Vojin Popović-Vuk
- Svetozar Ranković-Toza
- Trajko Mitrović-Koporan Čauš
- Jovan Cvetković-Dolgač
- Zafir Premčević
- Rista Cvetkovic
- Stojan Simonović-Koruba
- Krsta Kovačević-Trgoviški
- Trenko Rujanović
- Spasa Pavlović-Garda
- Rista Cvetković-Božinče
- Anđelko Aleksić (1904, Šuplji Kamen)
- Đorđe Cvetković (1904, Šuplji Kamen)
- Janićije Mićić
- Petko Ilić
- Rade Radivojević-Dušan (1907)
- Dragoljub Nikolić
- Rista Starački
- Jovan Pešić
- Ilija Trifunović-Birčanin
- Đorđe Ristić-Skopljanče
- Anđelko Stanković (Chetnik)
- Vladimir Kovačević
- Jovan Grković-Gapon
- Vanđel Dimitrijević-Skopljanče
- Aleksandar Blagojević-Kočanski
- Dragisa M. Kovacevic
- Dušan Dimitrijević-Dule
- Stevan Nedić-Ćela
- Todor Krstić-Algunjski
- Branivoje Jovanović-Brana
- Milan Vasić
- Milan Vidojević
- Pavle Blažarić
- Aleksa Komnenić-Hercegovac
- Sreten Rajković-Rudnički
- Panta Radosavljević
- Veličko Domorovski
- Rista Maksimovic-Giljance
- Vukajlo Božović-Prota
- Aleksandar Pavlovic (Chetnik)
- Milivoje Dinić
- Tasa Donić-Smederevac
- Milutin Babović-Telegraph
- Petar Mitrozić
- Milutin Ivanović
- Vasilije Trbić
- Vojvoda Dragomir is Dragomir Protić
- Bogdan Jugović Hajnc
- Danilo Smiljkovic
- Radoje Pantić
- Milorad Pavićević
- Milosav Jelić
- Dušan Jezdić
- Nikola Skadarac (1908)
- Petar Koćura (1908)
- Micko Krstić
- Andjelko Krstić
- Bogdan Radenković
- Jovan Naumović-Vojvoda Osogovski
- Jovan Ćirković
- Luka Ćelović
- Milorad Gođevac
- Nikola Spasić
- Ljubomir Kovačević
- Vasa Jovanović
- Vlada Voskar
- Sreten Vukosavljević
- Petar Kacarević
- Živko Gvozdić
- Vukajlo Božović
- Dejan Popović Jekić
- Ljubomir Vulović
- Ljuba Čupa
- Dane Stojanović
- Tasa Konević
- Trenko Rujanović
- Boško Virjanac
- Mihailo "Mikajle" Josifović
- Sava Petrović-Grmija
- Velimir Prelić
- Simo Kecojević
- Jovan Hadži-Vasiljević
- Toma Smiljanić-Bradina
- Stevan Simić
- Velimir Karić
- Alimpije Marjanovic
- Emilio Milutinović
- Dragoljub Džilić-Stric
- Vidosav Marjanović
- Strašimir Miletić
- Jovan Arandjelovic (Chetnik)
- Dušan Kalčić
- Žika Rafailović
- Denko Čuma
- Dragoljub Urošević-Podrinac
- Smail Smajo Ferovic
- Mara Kuckova
- David Dimitrijevic (Chetnik)
- Nikola Jankovic-Kosovski
- Blagoja Kusic
- Zivan Zivanovic
- Temeljko Barjaktarevic (1918)
- Arandjel Bojkovic
- Konstantin Minovic (1905)
- Petar Todorovic (Chetnik) (1905)
- Aleksa Jovanovic Kodza
- Panta Srećković
- Ditko Aleksić
- Dragiša Stojadinović
- Omilj Glisic
- Manojlo Anastasijevic-Bego
- Rista Cvetkovic (Celopek)

== Balkan Wars & World War I ==
- Milija and Pavle Bakić
- Stanislav Krakov
- Uroš Kostić-Rudinac
- Ilija Trifunović (1916; fighting in Old Serbia during German, Austrian and Bulgarian occupation)
- Vojin Popović (1916)
- Kosta Vojinović (1916)
- Puniša Račić (1916)
- Mustafa Golubić
- Milivoje M. Naumović
- Sofija Jovanović
- Milorad Petrović

== World War II ==
=== Yugoslav Army in the Fatherland ===
- Draža Mihailović (1893–1946), supreme commander, vojvoda of the Chetnik Detachments of the Yugoslav Army.
- Miroslav Trifunović (1894–1945), Yugoslav brigadier general, vojvoda šumadijski (Voivode of Šumadija).
- Dragoslav Račić (1905–1945), Yugoslav captain, vojvoda pocerski (Voivode of Pocerina).
- Nikola Kalabić (1906–1946), Yugoslav lieutenant, vojvoda oplenački (Voivode of Oplenac).
- Dragutin Keserović (1896–1945), Yugoslav major, vojvoda kopaonički (Voivode of Kopaonik).
- Zvonimir Vučković (1916–2004), Yugoslav lieutenant, vojvoda takovski (Voivode of Takovo).
- Predrag Raković (1912–1944), Yugoslav lieutenant, vojvoda ljubićki (Voivode of Ljubić).
- Dušan Smiljanić, Yugoslav captain, vojvoda gružanski (Voivode of Gruža).
- Aleksandar Mihajlović Vili (1907–1945), Yugoslav major, vojvoda avalski (Voivode of Avala).
- Milutin Janković (1913–1944), Yugoslav sublieutenant, vojvoda dragačevski (Voivode of Dragačevo).
- Velimir Piletić (1906–1972), Yugoslav major, vojvoda krajinski (Voivode of the Timok Valley).
- Neško Nedić, Yugoslav lieutenant, vojvoda valjevski (Voivode of Valjevo).
- Pero Đukanović (1892–1986), vojvoda od Ludmera (Voivode of Ludmer).
- Uroš Drenović (1911–1944), Yugoslav lieutenant, vojvoda in Bosnia.
- Petar Baćović (1898–1945), Yugoslav major, vojvoda kalinovički (Voivode of Kalinovik). Named in July 1942.
- Petar Samardžić, vojvoda in Herzegovina.
- Savo Kovač (1906–1946), vojvoda in Herzegovina. Named by Birčanin in 1942.
- Radojica Perišić (1906–1945), Orthodox priest, vojvoda in Golija.
- Mirko Marić
- Branko Bogunović
- Danilo Stanisavljević nicknamed Dane Cicvara (1917-1942) - voivode of Lika and Kordun
- Mane Rokvić (d. 1944).
- Vlada Novaković
- Karl Novak (1905–1975), Yugoslav captain, vojvoda in Slovenia.
- Pavle Đurišić (1909–1945), Yugoslav captain, vojvoda durmitorski (Voivode of Durmitor). Named in December 1941.
- Bajo Stanišić (1890–1943), Yugoslav colonel, vojvoda in Montenegro.
- Blažo Đukanović (1883–1943), Yugoslav brigadier general, vojvoda in Montenegro.
- Milo Rakočević (1910–2007), Yugoslav major, vojvoda in Montenegro. Named in July 1944.
- Miljan Anđušić (1895–1946), Yugoslav captain, vojvoda Zetski i Skenderijski.
- Novak Anđušić (1901–1943), vojvoda in Montenegro. Named by Voivode M. Anđušić in May 1941.
- Miloš Radoman (1903–1943), vojvoda in Montenegro.
- Blago Ajković (1899–1943), vojvoda in Montenegro. Self-styled.
- Vojislav Lukačević (1908–1945), vojvoda in Raška.
- Zaharije Ostojić (1907–1945), general command.
- Radovan Ivanišević, vojvoda dinarski (Voivode of the Dinara). Named by Birčanin.

=== Other ===
- Kosta Pećanac (1879–1944), vojvoda of the Pećanac Chetniks. Named during the Macedonian Struggle.
- Momčilo Đujić (1907–1999), vojvoda of the Dinara Division. Named by King Peter II in 1942.
- Dobroslav Jevđević (1895–1962), vojvoda of Herzegovina Chetniks. Self-appointed.
- Stojan Krstić, commander of the Vardar Chetnik Corps. Named in 1943.
- Aleksandar Janković (1921-2019) voivoda of Fruska Gora, Royal Yugoslav Army Air Force pilot, named in 1942 by Kosta Milovanović Pećanac
- Ilija Trifunović-Birčanin. Named during the Macedonian Struggle.
- Dragoslav Račić (1905–1945), Yugoslav colonel.
- Jezdimir Dangić, Yugoslav major.
- Dragiša Vasić (1885–1945), Yugoslav reserve officer.
- Aćim Babić, vojvoda in East Bosnia. Self-styled.

== Yugoslav Wars ==
=== By Momčilo Đujić ===
- Vojislav Šešelj - named by Momčilo Đujić on June 28, 1989
- Rade Čubrilo - named by Momčilo Đujić in 1993

=== By Vojislav Šešelj ===
On 13 May 1993:

- Zdravko Abramović
- Branislav Vakić.
- Srećko Radovanović.
- Slavko Crnić
- Nedeljko Vidaković.
- Slavko Aleksić (b. 1956), VRS commander of New Sarajevo Detachment.
- Mitar Maksimović "Manda" (1963–2002), VRS commander of the Majevica Lions.
- Miroslav Vuković "Ćele".
- Milika Dačević "Čeko".
- Tomislav Nikolić, SRS politician.
- Milan Lančužanin "Kameni".
- Zoran Dražilović "Čiča".
- Jovo Ostojić.
- Ljubiša Petković.
- Todor Lazić.
- Mirko Blagojević (b. 1956), SRS RS politician.
- Dragan Cvetković.
- Branislav Gavrilović "Brne", Šešelj's bodyguard.

On 20 March 1994:

- Vasilije Vidović "Vaske", Šešelj's bodyguard.
- Rade Radović (1961–1998), VRS commander of the Bileća Volunteers.
- Nikola Poplašen, politician.
- Mujo Bunjaku alias Oliver Denis Baret (d. 1994), Šešelj's bodyguard.
- Rade Čubrilo, commander of TO Medak.
- Miodrag Tripković.

== Named after Yugoslav Wars ==
- The oldest chetnik duke Mihajlo Jablanički in Tronoša near Loznica 28.Juna 2003 - named the Chetnik duke from Serbia
- Miodrag Božović - named by Milo Rakočević in 2007
- Andrija Mandić, Montenegrin Serb politician - named by Milo Rakočević in 2007
- Uroš Šušterič, World War II veteran - named by Milo Rakočević in 2007
