= Rade Radivojević =

Rade Radivojević–Dušan
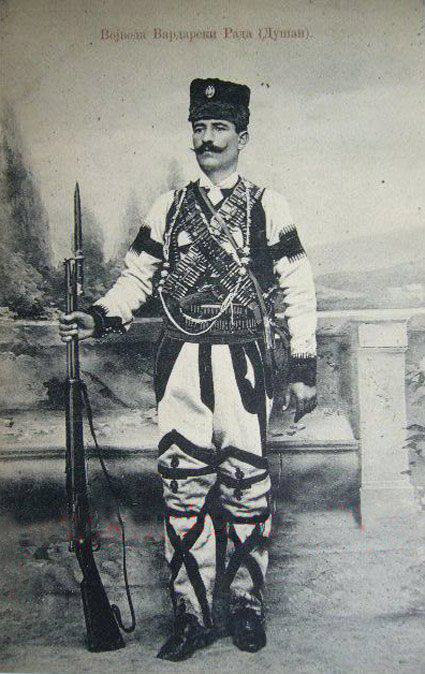
- "Vojvoda Vardarski Rade (Dušan)"
- Born: 1874; Vasojevići, Ottoman Empire (now Montenegro)
- Died: 15/16/17 July 1907 (aged 33); Gjilan region, Ottoman Empire (now Kosovo)
- Cause of death: Killed in battle by Idriz Seferi
- Military career
- Allegiance: Serbian Chetnik Organization (1905–1907)
- Service years: 1905–1907
- Nickname: "Vojvoda Dušan"
- Conflicts: Macedonian Struggle Battle of Pasjane †

Rade Radivojević (Serbian Cyrillic: Раде Радивојевић; 1874—July 1907), known as Vojvoda Dušan (Душан), was a Serbian Chetnik vojvoda in Old Serbia and Macedonia during the Macedonian Struggle.

== Life ==
Radivojević was born in 1874 in Vasojevići, Principality of Montenegro (now Montenegro). He finished the Serbian theological school in Prizren, and started teaching in the Oreše village near Veles.

Upon Jovan Babunski's joining of the Serbian Chetnik Organization, also Radivojević joined with his armed band into the vicinity of Veles. In 1905 and 1906 he participated in all action around Kičevo, Prilep and Veles, together with the voivodes Gligor Sokolović, Stefan Nedić, Vasilije Trbić, Trenko Rujanović, Jovan Dolgač, Mihailo Josifović and Mihailo Jovanović. Because of hectic guerrilla warfare and exhaustion, Radivojević and his band were returned to Serbia in late 1906, where they remained until spring 1907.

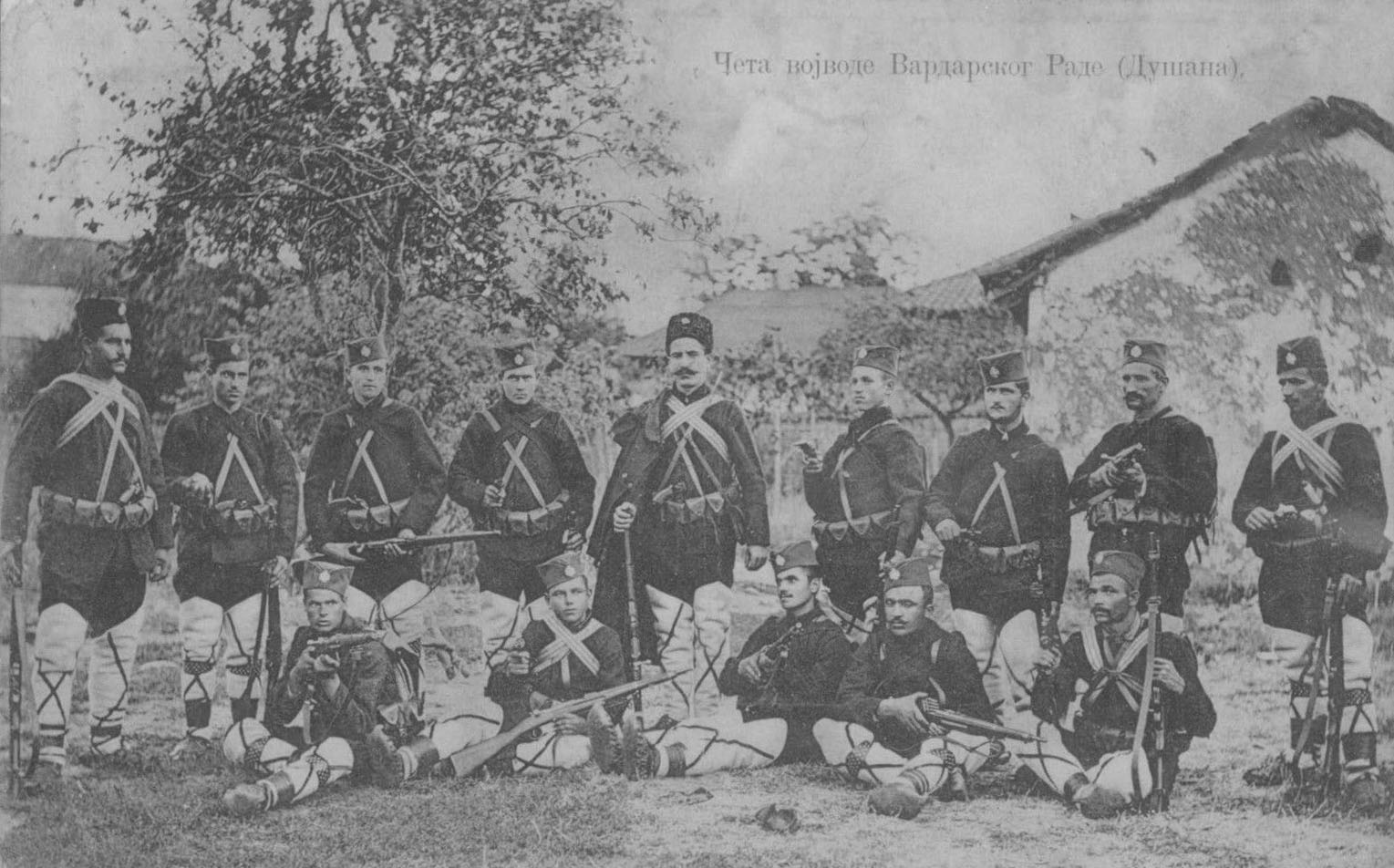
Radivojević and his band.

At this time, the Internal Macedonian Revolutionary Organization (IMRO) decided on a major offensive against the Serbian bands on the right side of the Vardar. An IMRO unit of 130 fighters under the command of several Bulgarian officers set off against Poreče and Azot to destroy Serbian bands and villages. The local Serbian bands were weakened and diminished by the constant warfare, thus, in March 1907 when the Ottoman troops proved strong in the Kumanovo region, Radivojević and his band were sent across Kosovo as aid, and were all wearing Albanian clothes with the plan to reach Poreče disguised as Albanian kachaks. However, they were discovered near the village of Pasjane in the Gjilan region on 14 July 1907, in the local church.

Rade and Dragoljub Nikolić, another high-ranking Chetnik, were then defeated and killed in battle alongside their entire Četa by Albanian guerilla leader Idriz Seferi and his band of Albanian fighters in Pasjane and Gjylekar.

== See also ==
- List of Chetnik voivodes

== Sources ==
Media related to Rade Radivojević-Dušan at Wikimedia Commons

- scindeks-clanci.ceon.rs
