= Panta Radosavljević =

Serbian army officer

Panta Radosavljević-Dunavski or Vojvoda Dunavski (28 August 1876 - 1941) was a Serbian army officer and Chetnik commander in Old Serbia and Macedonia in the early 20th century. He was also a writer.

== Early years ==
Radosavljević was born in Belgrade, Principality of Serbia (now Serbia) on 28 August 1876. After finishing gymnasium (high school) in Belgrade, he attended the prestigious Military Academy in Belgrade. In 1905, as an artillery lieutenant he joined the Serbian Chetnik Organization in Belgrade and volunteered to fight in Old Serbia and Macedonia against the oppressive regime of Sultan Abdul Hamid of the Ottoman Empire. He participated in several battles, including the Fight on Čelopek against superior forces of the Ottoman Army, alongside Gligor Sokolović, Jovan Babunski, and Sreten Rajković-Rudnički, another military man from the same academy. He also participated in the Balkans Wars of 1912 and 1913 and World War I.

== Literary years ==
Between the wars, he wrote historical articles for learned publications in Belgrade:

- Dve katastrofalne godine 1389 i 1915 (Two Catastrophic Years: 1389 and 1915), 1925
- Šta je Maćedonija? (What is Macedonia?), 1925

== World War II ==
During World War II Radosavljević in his senior years joined the army. In April 1941 he was captured by the Germans and sent to a POW camp in Nuremberg, where he died of tuberculosis in December of the same year.

== See also ==
- List of Chetnik voivodes

== Sources ==
- Krakov, Stanislav (1990) [1930]. Plamen četništva (in Serbian). Belgrade: Hipnos.
