= Dragiša Stojadinović =

Serbian lawyer (1886–1968)

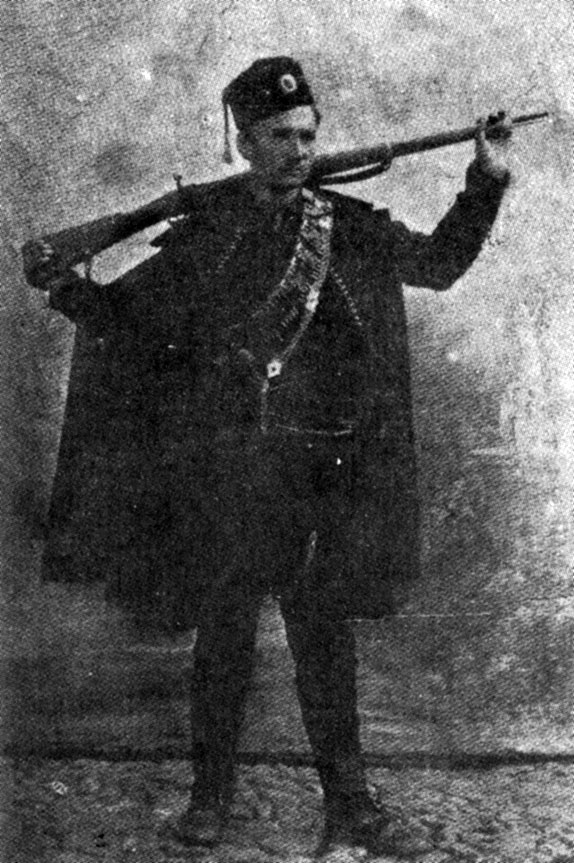
Dragiša Stojadinović in Chetnik gear, between 1904 and 1908.

Dragiša M. Stojadinović (Serbian Cyrillic: Драгиша Стојадиновић, 1886–1968), known by his nom de guerre Krajinac (Крајинац), was a Serbian soldier, lawyer, politician, photographer and filmmaker.

== Life ==
Stojadinović was born in Jasenica, Negotin, Kingdom of Serbia, the son of prota Milovan of Negotin. He finished the Zaječar gymnasium.

He joined the Serbian Chetnik Organization in 1904. His nom de guerre was "Krajinac".

During the Balkan Wars he was commander of the machine gun division. His war-time photographs were not included in the illustrated magazines.

After the war he was an inspector at the Ministry of Commerce and Industry.

He founded the Cinematographic Department in Thessaloniki.

== War Years ==
As a graduate of Zajecar gymnasium, Stojadinović contacted fellow countrymen in Belgrade, members of the University Association of Bloodbrothers who recruited young people to liberate the Christian population in Old Serbia, then under Ottoman occupation. At the age of 19 in the spring of 1905, he left with voivode Doksim Mihailović to cross the Ottoman-occupied border and participated in the Fight on Čelopek. After this fight, he continued as a freedom-fighter in the Kumanovo area under the command of Đorđe Skopljanče and later in the Veles and Prilep region under the voivodes Rade Radivojević, Jovan Babunski and Vasilije Trbić until 1908. In the skirmish with Bulgarians in the village of Drenovo near Makedonski Brod on 14 June 1907, he shot the rifle off the hands of VMRO voivode Stefan Dimitrov. After 1908 he enrolled in law school studies, which he completed in good time. In 1911, as a famed crack shot, he was chosen by the French rifle club l'Union des Tireurs Serbes in Belgrade to participate in a European rifle shooting competition in Rome where he took first prize. He defended the title until 1914. In the wars of 1912 up until 1918, he participated as a reserve officer in the 13th Hajduk Veljko Infantry Regiment. During the Balkan wars, he became more involved in recording the bellicose events as a photographer and cinematographer. After the war, he published a photo album of photographs from the Balkan wars and the Arnaut rebellion. By order of the Supreme Command in 1916, he became head of the Cinematographic Section of the Supreme Command of the Serbian Army. Many important war events were recorded due to the outstanding organization of Serbian war photographers and cameramen who were under his watch. After the war, he still continued to record important happenings and events.

== Political stage ==
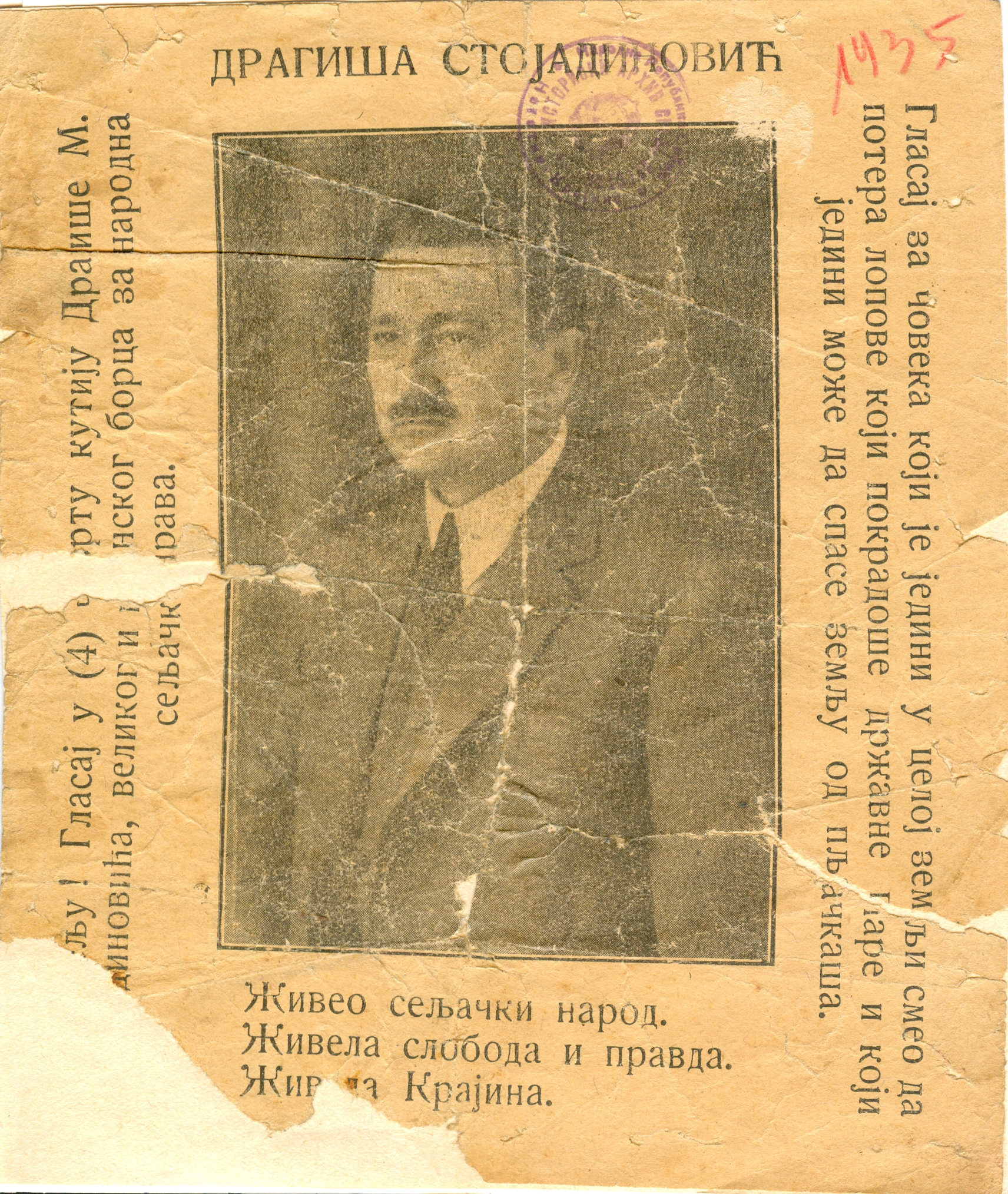
Drasica Stojadinovic's poster for the 1935 elections

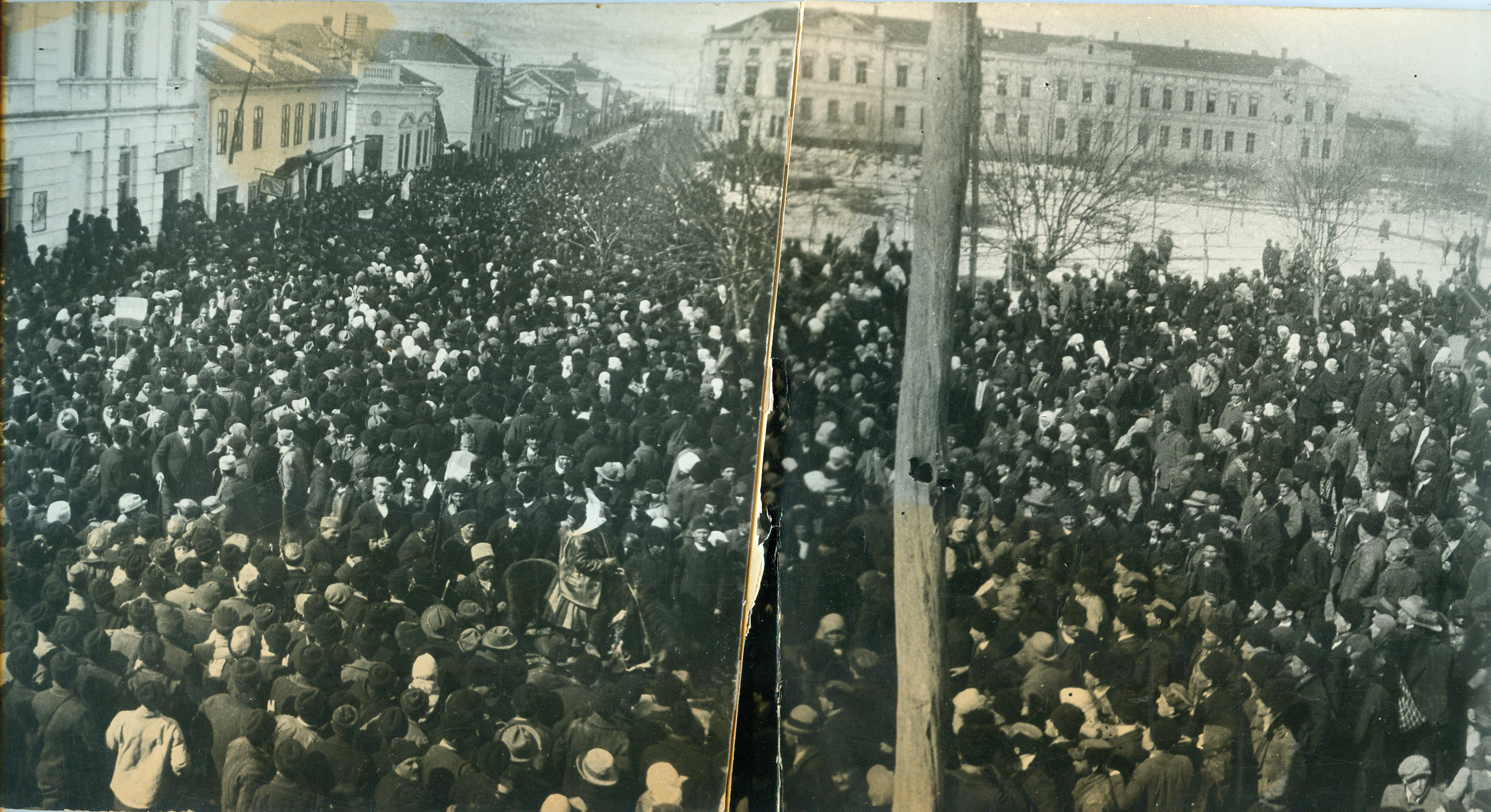
Political rally of Dragisa Stojadinovic in Negotin, 1936

Dragiša Stojadinović was a staunch Democrat and anti-fascist and anti-corruption fighter. As a member of the Timok district, he spoke out against what he considered an injustice, both as a lawyer and as a politician. In 1936 he came into conflict with Milan Stojadinović whom he attacked for trying to make a rapprochement with the Axis forces. The People's Court sentenced him to prison, which he served from 1936 to 1939. In 1941, he recorded with a color camera the Yugoslav coup d'état of 27 March. After the Nazis invaded and occupied Serbia, he hid from the Gestapo in Montenegro. After the war, he engaged in writing and left a rich written legacy, as well as the search for his own films that OZNA (Odeljenje za zaštitu naroda, in other words, the security agency of Communist Yugoslavia that existed between 1944 and 1952) stole. He died in Belgrade in 1968.

== Personal life ==
He was the son-in-law of Ljubomir S. Jovanović.

== Awards ==
- Medal for Bravery
- Order of the Star of Karađorđe

== Sources ==
Books

- Trbić, Vasilije (1996). Memoari: 1898-1912 (in Serbian). Kultura. ISBN 9788678010132.
- Milanka Todić (1993). Istorija srpske fotografije, 1839-1940. Prosveta. ISBN 9788607007400.

E-books

- Jovičić, Stevan (1999). "S kamerom i puškom: Dragiša M. Stojadinović". (only summary)

Newspaper articles

- Subašić, B. (2012-10-27). "Драгиша Стојадиновић: Херој са пушком и фото – објективом". Novosti.
