= Dane Stojanović =

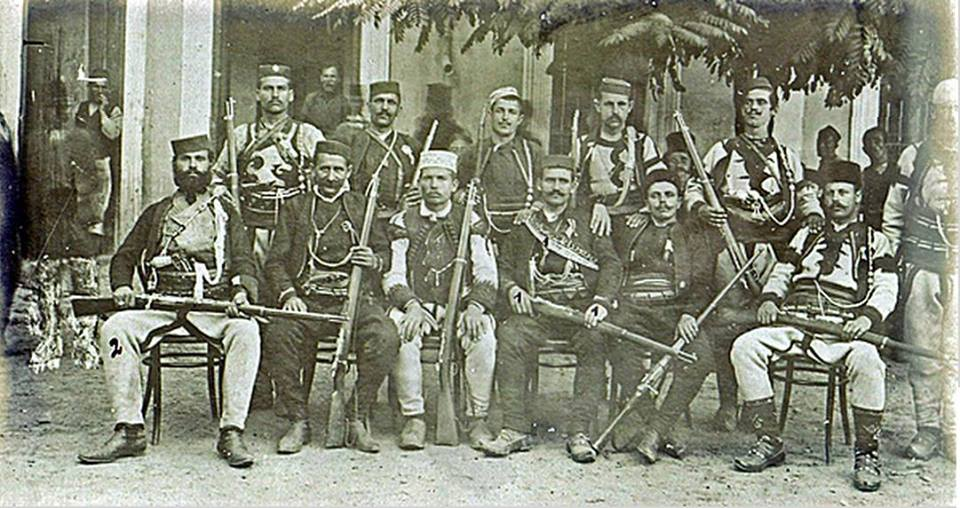
- Dane Stojanović with other commanders in Bitola, 1908. He is seen standing in the centre, with a light hat.
- Born: Krapa, Makedonski Brod, Prilep kaza, Ottoman Empire (now R. Macedonia)
- Died: Yugoslavia
- Military career
- Allegiance: Serbian Chetnik Organization (1904–1908); (Kingdom of Serbia) Serbian Army (1912–13)
- Service years: 1904–13
- Rank: Voivode (Vojvoda)
- Conflicts: Macedonian Struggle; Balkan Wars

Danilo "Dane" Stojanović (Serbian Cyrillic: Дане Стојановић, fl. 1904–18) was a Serbian Chetnik commander in Old Serbia and Macedonia (1904–08), who also participated in the Balkan Wars (1912–13). He was also known as Dane Krapče.

== Life ==
Stojanović was born in Krapa, a village in the Makedonski Brod municipality, at the time part of the Prilep kaza of the Ottoman Empire (now Makedonski Brod, R. Macedonia). He joined the cheta (band) of Gligor Sokolović. Upon the murder of Sokolović by Turks on July 30, 1910, Stojanović succeeded as the band's commander. He participated in the Balkan Wars. In the First Balkan War, he was at the front of the Chetnik detachments and fought at Kumanovo and Bitola.

== See also ==
- List of Chetnik voivodes
- Trenko Rujanović
- Tasa Konević

== Sources ==
- Društvo "Sveti Sava" (2009). "BRATSTVO XIII" (PDF) (in Serbian). Belgrade. Archived from the original (PDF) on 2015-09-24.
- Trbić, Vasilije (1996). Memoari: 1898-1912 (in Serbian). Kultura. ISBN 9788678010132.
