= Milutin Babović =

Chetnik voivode

Milutin Babović-Telegraph (Goražde, a village in northeastern Montenegro, in the municipality of Berane, 1858 - Kosovska Mitrovica, Kingdom of Yugoslavia, 1932) was a Chetnik voivode in the struggle for Macedonia and Old Serbia, and a soldier in the Balkan Wars and World War I. Before he joined the Serbian Chetnik Organization, his past activities as a confidential messenger between two courts, in Belgrade and Cetinje were known to everyone by the nickname he got as a teenager from Nicholas I of Montenegro.

== Biography ==
Milutin Jovanov Babović, orphaned at the age of three, was adopted and raised by his grandfather Marko and uncle Miloš, who taught him Hajduk skills to fight against the Turks, protect his people from exploitation by them.

Milutin's task was to travel between the two capitals, cross the border each time, and convey to each king a message from the other when it was too dangerous to write anything down on paper from fear of interception by enemies of the two countries. During the First Balkan War, Milutin with his two sons Mihailo and Milić went on active missions from Pljevlja behind enemy lines in Ottoman Turkey.

In 1877, carrying a message for Nicholas Petrović-Njegoš while running, he traversed a distance from Rijeka Crnojevića to Andrijevica, 131 kilometers in one day. Prince Nicholas, when he found out about this, gave him the name Telegraf (Telegraph). People in Vasojevići, nicknamed him Milutin Telj.

After the May Coup in 1903 and the arrival of Peter Karadjordjević on the Serbian throne, Milutin moved his family to Kragujevac. He entered the service of King Peter as commander of the King's Guard. But whenever the Serbian Chetnik Organization needed him in the so-called Sandjak, as the Ottomans like to call the Serbian region of Raška, he was always ready to avail himself and transport weapons behind enemy lines to arm Serb villagers and rebels alike against the Turks or Albanian bashi-bazouks or Kachaks.

Later in life, he moved from Kragujevac to Kosovska Mitrovica where he died in 1932.

== See also ==
- List of Chetnik voivodes
- Narodna Odbrana, Serbian organization
- White Hand, Serbian organization
- Young Bosnia, Bosnian pan-Yugoslav organization
- Hellenic Macedonian Committee, Greek nationalist organization during the Macedonian Struggle
- Hajduk
- Army of the Kingdom of Serbia
