= Anta Todorovic =

Serbian national representative

Antonije "Anta" Todorović Šarplaninac
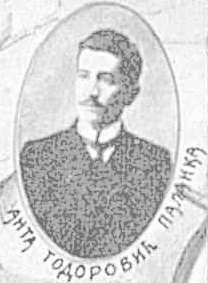
- Anta Todorović
- Born: 1880; Prizren, Ottoman Empire
- Died: 1970 (aged 89–90); Belgrade, Yugoslavia
- Occupations: Teacher, political activist
- Known for: Member of the Serbian Chetnik Organization; representative of Serbs in the Ottoman Empire
- Notable work: Founding of the Chetnik board in Kumanovo

Antonije "Anta" Todorović Šarplaninac (Serbian: Антоније Тодоровић; Prizren, 1880 – Belgrade, 1970) was a Serbian teacher, national representative of Serbs in the Ottoman Empire, and a member of the Serbian Chetnik Organization in Old Serbia, today's Macedonia, during the Chetnik actions at the beginning of the 20th century.

== Biography ==
He was born in Prizren into a family of craftsmen and merchants. He graduated from Prizren Theological Seminary in 1897. The same year, he became a teacher at a Serbian school, and from 1902 in Bitolj, and in 1904 he became a teacher at a Serbian civic school in Kumanovo. With the formation of the Serbian Chetnik organization, he became a member and leading figure of its board in Kumanovo. Together with the teacher Jovan Cakić, Lazar Božović and the archpriest Atanasije Petrović Taško, he formed the city board of the Serbian Chetnik organization in Kumanovo during 1904. This committee was established in the fall of 1904 and had the task of informing, supplying, and supporting the Serbian companies in the Kumanovo Kaza. When the VMRO committee killed the Serbian priest Atanasije Petrović Taško on 15 January 1905 in Kumanovo, the committee of the Serbian organization decided to kill the exarchate archpriest Aleksandar, in revenge on the day of the forty-day commemoration of Taško. The main organizer of the revenge murder was Anta Todorović.

Although he was briefly in danger of being arrested, Todorović escaped imprisonment. In 1906, he had to flee to Serbia because his name was found in the papers of the Serbian Chetniks killed on Čelopek. He returned to Turkey after the Young Turk Revolution and became a deputy for Kriva Palanka and the surrounding area in the First Assembly of Serbs in the Ottoman Empire. After the Young Turk Revolution until 1912, he was the director of Serbian schools for the Krivopolanacka Kaza. He was a people's deputy in the temporary people's representation of the Serbs and Croats in 1921. After World War I, he was the school superintendent in Prizren.

Todorović continued his political activities as one of the supporters of Jaša Prodanović and the Republican Party. Listing the members of the Republican Party who were close to the Ravno Gora Movement, Dr. Dragoljub Jovanović added: "The great Serb from Prizren, Anta Todorović, was also connected with Draža." In 1954, he sent an open letter to Miroslav Krleža, for which he was sentenced to three years in prison. He died in Belgrade at the age of 91.
