= Svetozar Ranković-Toza =

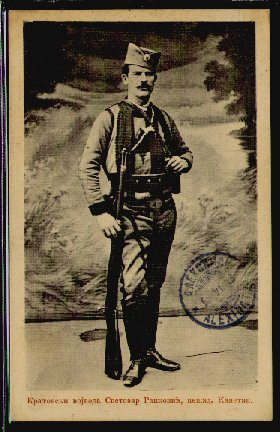
A portrait of Ranković-Toza

Svetozar Ranković-Toza (Serbian: Светозар Ранковић; 1880 – November or December 1914) was a Serbian Chetnik soldier and voivode during the struggle for Macedonia, the Balkan Wars and World War I. He was one of the key Chetnik commanders in the fight to liberate the Balkan Peninsula from Ottoman and Habsburg occupation.

== Biography ==
Svetozar Ranković was born in Junkovac in the region of Lepnitsa, Serbia. After graduating from high school, he enrolled in the 33rd class of the Military Academy in 1900, but left and completed his military education in Imperial Russia. He returned home and joined the Serbian Army. He was active in the struggle for Macedonia and Old Serbia from 1904. In 1907, he became a voivode.

Prior to the First Balkan War in 1912, he was the head (chief) of the mountain staff headquarters at Kozjak, near Kumanovo. Before the Kumanovo battle, he got the villagers to rise against the Ottoman government in the region of Kriva Palanka and Kratovo. He led 200 Chetniks against the Turks in the Battle of Kumanovo. He was also wounded there. He also commanded the Chetniks in the Second Balkan War in 1913. At the Battle of Kolubara in World War I, he was the commander of the Brigade of the Gornjače Chetnik Detachment. In the position of Trešnjica near Užice in Bici on the Drina, a grenade had pierced both legs, after which he committed suicide in order not to be caught alive. His death was immortalized in Milosav Jelić's "Srbijanski venac" (Serbian Wreath).

A street in Belgrade was once named after him.

== See also ==
- List of Chetnik voivodes
