= Stevan Simić =

Stevan Simić (9 May 1882, in Kratovo – 25 June 1962, in Skopje) was a Serb geographer, educator and member of the Serbian Chetnik Organization in Old Serbia and an MP in the Kingdom of Yugoslavia.

== Life ==
Simić was born in Kratovo, Sanjak of Üsküp, Kosovo vilayet in 1882. He finished primary school in Thessaloniki and in Istanbul. After graduating from gymnasium (high school) he worked as a teacher in the village of Turalevo, close to Kratovo. In 1902 he went to continue his education at the University of Belgrade where he graduated in 1906.

In Belgrade he met the founders of the Serbian Committee and soon became an active member of its revolutionary board. From 1906 to 1912 he worked as a teacher in Serb schools in Bitola, Pljevlja, Thessaloniki and Skopje in Ottoman territories. As a polyglot, during World War I he served as a translator to the British high command on the Salonika front.

After the war he served as the headmaster of high schools in Veles, Ohrid and Prizren. This was also his most prolific period as a scientist in which he published a number of articles in the fields of ethnology, history and archeology. After frequent disputes with corrupted politicians he was sent to retirement in 1929. After this he was voted into the Yugoslav parliament as an MP for the county of Kratovo.

At the Nazi onslaught on Yugoslavia and the Bulgarian occupation of Macedonia he escaped to Belgrade where he spent the rest of the war. Unlike many of his compatriots, Simić did not succumb to pressures of the communist regime to change his surname and declare himself an ethnic Macedonian. Barely tolerated by the authorities Simić lived in Skopje modestly, spending most of his time in writing memoirs. He died in Skopje in 1962. He donated his belongings and manuscripts to the Serbian Academy of Arts and Sciences. This corpus of over 200 manuscripts has a first rate significance for studying life and times of Simić's Macedonia.

== Works ==
- Историја кратовске области, Београд 1914.
- Комитско четовање у Старој Србији и Македонији 1903–1912, Београд 1998.

== See also ==
- List of Chetnik voivodes
