= Petar Kacarević =

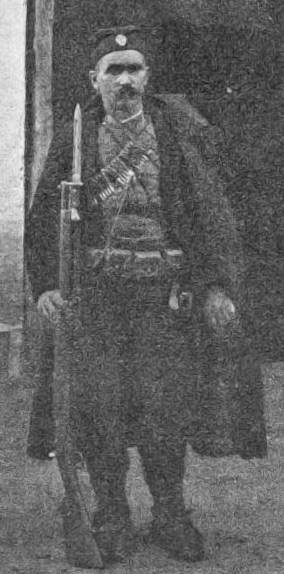
- Petar Kacarević in 1906
- Born: Petar Kacarević; Maleš near Berovo, Kosovo Vilayet (now North Macedonia)
- Died: 1906; Maleš
- Military career
- Allegiance: Serbian Chetnik Organization (1904–06)
- Service years: 1904–06
- Rank: vojvoda
- Nicknames: Pera (diminutive); Čiča ("Uncle")
- Unit: Maleševo

Petar Kacarević (Serbian Cyrillic: Петар Кацаревић; fl. 1905–06), nicknamed Pera (Пера) and Čiča (чича, "uncle"), was a vojvoda (commander) of the Serbian Chetnik Organization active in the Maleševo region.

Kacarević hailed from Maleš on the Krivi Bor near Berovo. The Kacarević family adhered to the Patriarchate of Constantinople. Veljko Kacarević, an Orthodox priest from Berovo, was a Serbian teacher in the region in the 19th century, and manager of the Serbian schools in the region (fl. 1902). Ilija Kacarević, an alumnus of the Prizren Seminary, was a priest and the deputy of Berovo.

His band fought Bulgarians at Maleš on the 10th, 16th, 20 and 21 November 1905, without casualties. His band of 12 fighters fought with 186 Ottoman soldiers on the hill of Krivo Brdo near Berovo on 12 May 1906, with 10 casualties; the band had been betrayed by Bulgarian Exarchists in Berovo. He died while fighting on the Maleš, and with him the other nine fell: Jakov Đura Gabaj of Stara Pazova; Gligorije Đorđević of Ratevo; Đura Ivanišević of Montenegro; Đorđe Filipović-Brka of Prizren; Vojislav Vujović; Todor Božidarac of Niš; Milorad Mijailović; Milić Đukić; Mijailo Petrović of Šabac.

== Sources ==
- Blažarić, Pavle (2006). Božica Mladenović (ed.). Memoari (in Serbian). Institut za srpsku kulturu. ISBN 9788682797500.
- Dedijer, Vladimir; Anić, Života; Samardžić, Radovan (2006). Dokumenti o spoljnoj politici Kraljevine Srbije: sv. 2 15. SANU, Odeljenje istorijskih nauka. ISBN 9788670254169.
- Đurić, Veljko Đ.; Mijović, Miličko (1993). Ilustrovana istorija četničkog pokreta (in Serbian). Narodna knj.
- Ivanić, Ivan (1910). Maćedonija i maćedondži. Vol. 2. Štampa Savića i Komp.
