= Dolni Manastirec =

Dolni Manastirec Долни Манастирец
- Village
- Location within North Macedonia
- Coordinates: 41.614758°N 21.211791°E
- Country: North Macedonia
- Region: Southwestern
- Municipality: Makedonski Brod

Population (2002)
  - Total: 169
- Time zone: UTC+1 (CET)
  - Summer (DST): UTC+2 (CEST)

Dolni Manastirec (Macedonian: Долни Манастирец) is a village in the municipality of Makedonski Brod, North Macedonia.

== Demographics ==
According to the 2002 census, the village had a total of 169 inhabitants. Ethnic groups in the village include:

- Macedonians 169
