= Rista Cvetković-Božinče =

- Born: 1845; Vranje
- Died: 16 June 1878 (aged 32–33)
- Occupation: Freedom fighter

Rista Cvetković-Božinče (born 1845, died 16 June 1878) was one of the earliest freedom-fighters for the Macedonian struggle and Old Serbia during the time of the Kumanovo Uprising and a little after.

Rista Cvetković-Božinče, who came from Vranje, had submitted a proposal that reflected a general dissatisfaction with Ottoman rule in 1878. He collected on a request of 5,000 signatures and 800 municipal seals a petition that wanted Skopje, Veles and Tikvas to join the Principality of Serbia. The collection of signatures happened during the Kumanovo Uprising and even after it was suppressed. It was also at the height of the Bulgarian Exarchate propaganda in Macedonia and Old Serbia. The petitions were mainly directed to Prince Milan I of Serbia and Emperor Alexander II of Russia, but also addressed to European diplomats and the sultan. The Turkish authorities and the Bulgarian Exarchate clergy tried hard to convict Cvetković who collected the signatures.

According to Spiridon Gopčević, Cvetković met a most heinous fate when he was caught with the "smoking gun" – the petition with signatories and the municipal seals. He was mercilessly quartered on the Skopje-Kumanovo road by the Ottoman gandermerie. His murder took place on 16 June 1878.

In the request for unification with Serbia, the application had more than 50 municipal seals but no signature because 250 people from Skopje were arrested who signed Cvetković's petition, and only 50 of them were released from the casemates. The others were executed.

== See also ==
- List of Chetnik voivodes
