= Braḱani =

Braḱani Браќани Braqan
- Village
- Location within North Macedonia
- Coordinates: 41.6625°N 21.1847°E
- Country: North Macedonia
- Region: Southwestern
- Municipality: Makedonski Brod
- Time zone: UTC+1 (CET)
  - Summer (DST): UTC+2 (CEST)

Braḱani (Macedonian: Дреново, Albanian: Braqan) is an abandoned village located in the municipality of Makedonski Brod, North Macedonia.

== Demographics ==
In statistics gathered by Vasil Kanchov in 1900, the village of Braḱani was inhabited by 50 Muslim Albanians. According to the 1929 ethnographic map by Russian Slavist Afanasy Selishchev, Braḱani was an Albanian village.
