= Kacarević =

Kacarević (Serbian Cyrillic: Кацаревић) is a Serbian surname traditionally found in the Maleševo region in eastern North Macedonia. It may refer to:

- Petar Kacarević, Serbian Chetnik commander from Berovo.
- Veljko Kacarević, Serbian Orthodox priest from Berovo, a Serbian teacher in the Maleševo region in the 19th century, and manager of the Serbian schools in the region (fl. 1902).
- Ilija Kacarević, Serbian Orthodox priest and the deputy of Berovo, alumni of the Prizren Seminary.

== See also ==
- Kačarević
