= Dimitrije Dimitrijević (Chetnik) =

Serbian Priest and Komitadji Leader

- Димитрије Димитријевић
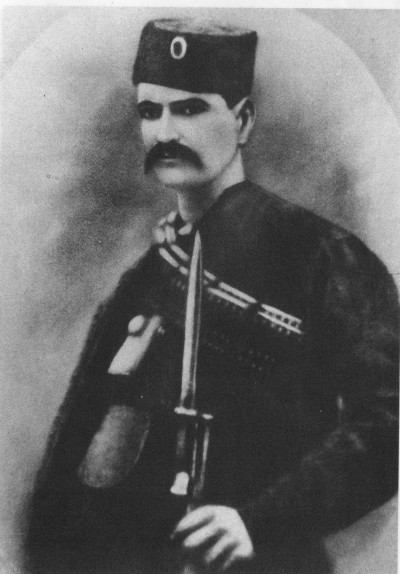
- Born: 1881; Gjakova, Ottoman Empire
- Died: 1917-12-17; Nis, Serbia
- Education: Serbian Orthodox Seminary (Prizren)

Dimitrije Dimitrijević (Serbian Cyrillic: Димитрије Димитријевић; Gjakova, Kosovo, Ottoman Empire, 1881 – Niš, Serbia, 17 December 1917) was a priest and one of the leaders of the Toplica Uprising in the occupied Kingdom of Serbia during World War I.

He grew up in an artisan family and graduated from Prizren Seminary in 1898. He moved to Serbia around 1900, where he was a priest and teacher, serving along the then Serbian-Ottoman border.

He was one of the organizers of the Toplica Uprising and a head of the Jablanica Detachment of the Chetniks.

At the end of August 1917, in a conflict with the Bulgarian army on the Salonica front, Dimitrijević was wounded and captured. The Bulgarians imprisoned him in the Niš Fortress, where he was tortured to death.

== See also ==
- List of Chetnik voivodes
