= Bogdan Jugović Hajnc =

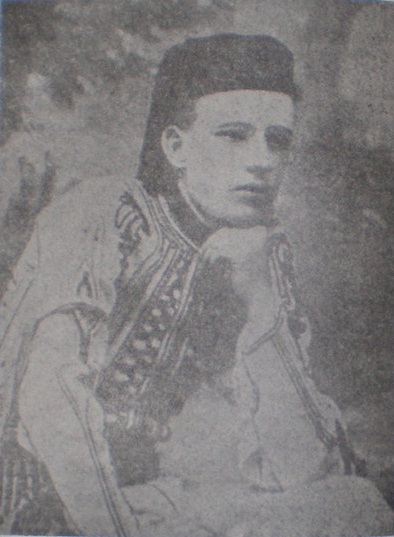

Bogdan Jugović Hajnc (1882 in Valjevo – 30 May 1905 in Petraljica, near Kumanovo) was a commissioned officer in the Serbian Army and a Chetnik commander known as Vojvoda Bogdan.

Bogdan Jugović Hajnc was a son of a Polish medical officer who emigrated to Serbia. Jugović grew up to be a Serbian patriot. He was an orphan when he completed the gymnasium and enrolled in the prestigious Military Academy in Belgrade on 1 September 1899. Two years later, he was promoted to the rank of artillery lieutenant. In 1905, he sold all his possessions and gave all the money to the Serbian Chetnik Organization, excluding a 3,000 dinar legacy that he left to a poor neighbor, before going to war.

He participated in the successful Fight on Čelopek against the Ottoman army. He was brave and popular, and the volunteers under his command respected him. On 30 May 1905 while in the cheta command led by Branivoje Jovanović, also known as Vojvoda Brane, Bogdan Jugović Hajnc was in the village of Petraljica, when Turks who had been tipped of their location surrounded them. The Chetniks locked themselves in two houses, which the Turks after a long skirmish stormed and set ablaze. Bogdan and Brana and the entire band of Chetniks were burnt to death. His remains were excavated the next day and buried by the Petraljica church, along with the rest. The events were recorded in poetry.

== See also ==
- List of Chetnik voivodes

== Sources ==
- Blažarić, Pavle (2006). Božica Mladenović (ed.). Memoari. Institut za srpsku kulturu. ISBN 9788682797500.
