= Battle of Pasjane =

Battles of Pasjane and Gjylekar
- Part of the Macedonian Struggle
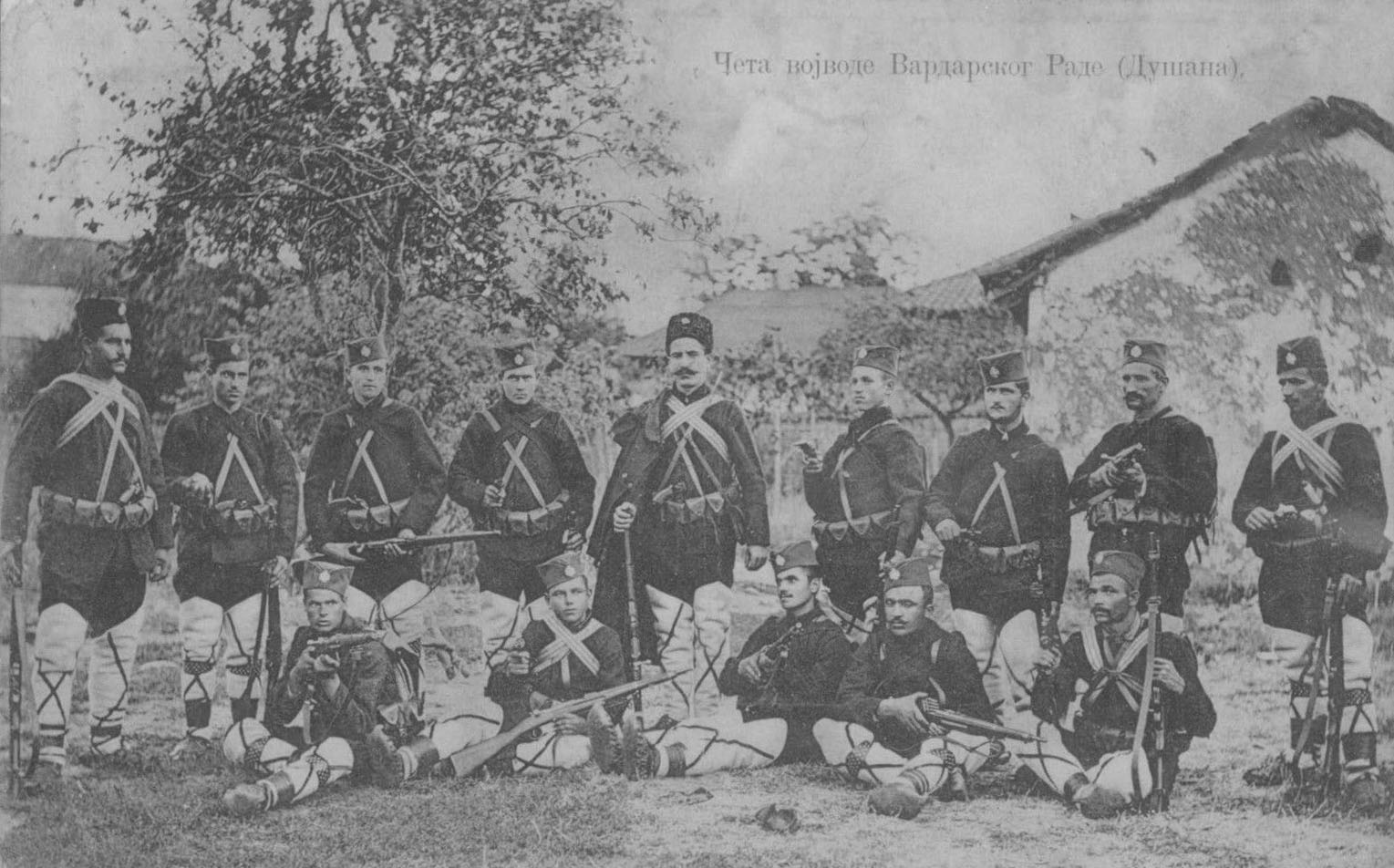
- Cheta of Vojvoda Rade Radivojević
Date	15–17 July 1907
Location	Pasjane, Kosovo Vilayet, Ottoman Empire
Result	Albanian victory

Belligerents
Albanian Kachaks	Serbian Chetnik Organization

Commanders and leaders
Idriz Seferi	Rade Radivojević †; Dragoljub Nikolić †; Mihailo Bošković †; Živan Milosavljević †

Units involved
Kachaks from: Karadak	Chetniks from: Vranje

Strength
Unknown	40 Chetniks

Casualties and losses
6 killed 13 wounded	38 killed, only 2 survivors, later executed.

The Battle of Pasjane refers to a series of clashes between Albanian Kachaks under the command of Idriz Seferi and Serbian Chetniks under the command of Rade Radivojević and Dragoljub Nikolić during July 1907 in the villages at the foothills of the Skopska Crna Gora (Karadak) Mountains. The battles ended in a Serbian Chetniks defeat, with almost all of their soldiers falling in battle.

== Prelaude ==
In the summer of 1907, Serbian Chetnik squads were active in areas with Serbian minorities in the Sanjak of Prishtina, including the Kaza of Gjilan. Albanians in the Skopska Crna Gora under Idriz Seferi formed volunteer squads to monitor and counter Serbian insurgent activities. These Albanian squads were organized throughout the Kosovo Vilayet, including Karadak and Gjilan.

== Battle ==
In July 1907, the "Pasjani squad," composed of about 40 well-armed and trained Komiti from Vranje, infiltrated over the Skopska Crna Gora mountains into the Kaza of Gjilan, disguised in Albanian national clothing. They took refuge in the church of Pasjane village. After three days, the Chetniks were discovered by passing Albanian villagers, prompting the Albanian Kachaks under Idriz Seferi in Gjilan to respond, with some limited assistance from local Ottoman government officers. On July 15, 1907, a clash ensued around the church, resulting in heavy casualties, predominantly among the Serbian Chetniks. The Chetniks managed to break the siege but were pursued and further engaged by Albanian Kachaks. Near the village of Gjylekar, 15 Chetniks were killed, while the Albanian side suffered two deaths and seven injuries. Subsequent clashes near Preševo led to more Chetniks deaths. The two-day conflict resulted in the deaths of 38 Serbian Chetniks, including their leader Dragoljub Nikolić, and six Albanian casualties with 13 wounded. The fallen Chetniks were buried by the Kachaks in Gjilan at the Martyrs' Hill (formerly Popovica).

== Aftermath ==
The destruction of the Pasjani squad resonated both within and outside Albanian inhabited territories. The failure of the Belgrade government's tactics led the Serbian consulate in Prishtina and the Russian embassy in Istanbul to call for an end to further military actions.
