= Jovan Grković-Gapon =

Serbian monk ang guerrilla fighter (1879–1912)

- Nickname: Gapon
- Born: 1879; Orahovac, Kosovo Vilayet, Ottoman Empire (modern Kosovo)
- Died: 9 October 1912 (aged 32–33) Dragomance, Ottoman Empire (modern North Macedonia)
- Allegiance: Kingdom of Serbia
- Branch: Chetniks
- Service years: 1904–1912

Jovan Grković (Serbian Cyrillic: Јован Грковић; 1879 – 9 October 1912), nicknamed Gapon (Гапон) was a former Serbian Orthodox monk who joined the Serb guerrilla (chetniks) in the Macedonian Struggle (1902–1912).

== Life ==
Grković was born in Orahovac, in the vicinity of Prizren, at the time part of the Kosovo Vilayet of the Ottoman Empire.

He finished grammar and theological school in Prizren, then became a monk, serving as deacon under the Serbian Orthodox Metropolitan (vladika) of Žiča. He went to the Serbian Orthodox monastery of Hilandar on Mount Athos, where he took the monastic name Jeremija (Јеремија). He stayed at Athos at the same time as Vasilije Trbić, but as conflict arose with the Greek and Bulgarian monks, they left for Serbia together, sometime in 1902. They subsequently joined the cause of the Serbian guerrilla fighters ("chetniks") against the Ottomans. Unusually combative and revolutionary for being a former monk, he was nicknamed "Gapon" after Russian Orthodox monk and working-class leader Georgy Gapon, by his fellow guerrilla fighters.

When the Serbian Chetnik Assembly were to appoint the voivode of Skoplje, Gapon suggested giving it to young veteran fighter Kosta Pećanac — all members agreed, and in a great meeting at Christmas 1904, Pećanac received the title at only 25 years old. Gapon fought in the units of Doksim Mihailović and then Kosta Pećanac, being an active Chetnik until his death. In 1907 or 1908, while Gapon was fighting in the Veles kaza, he sang the song "The Serb Trumpet Plays For Me" (Srpska mi truba zatrubi) at Drenovo, and also sang it during the Macedonian celebration in Belgrade (1909), from where it became popular across the country. He died on 9 October 1912, the same day the First Balkan War began, while fighting around Kumanovo, at Staro Nagoričane.

== See also ==
- List of Chetnik voivodes
