= Doksim Mihailović =

Vojvoda Doksim Mihailović
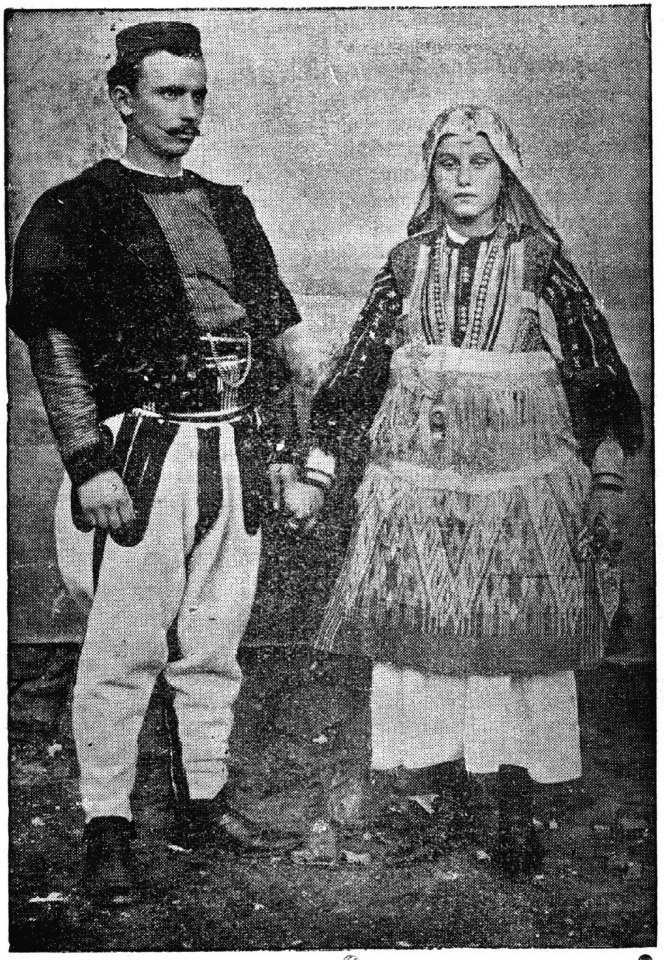
- Doksim and his wife.
- Born: 20 February 1883; Galičnik, Sanjak of Dibra, Manastir Vilayet, Ottoman Empire (now North Macedonia)
- Died: 24 October 1912 (aged 29); Kumanovo, Sanjak of Üsküp, Ottoman Empire (now North Macedonia)
- Burial place: Mlado Nagoričane
- Military career
- Allegiance: Serbian Chetnik Organization; Kingdom of Serbia
- Service years: 1904–1912
- Rank: vojvoda
- Nicknames: Debarac; Galičanac

Doksim Mihailović (Serbian: Доксим Михаиловић; 20 February 1883 – 24 October 1912) was a Macedonian Serb voivode (military commander), originally a teacher, who joined the Serbian Chetnik Organization to fight in Ottoman Macedonia, and then the Balkan Wars (in the army of the Kingdom of Serbia). Originally a teacher, he fought against the Ottomans army and later Bulgarian guerrilla bands in the Kosovo Vilayet.

== Life ==
Doksim was born in Galičnik, a Mijak village. He finished the theological school in Prizren, and was a teacher in his home region until 1904, when he joined the Serbian Chetnik Organization. In January 1905, vojvoda Gligor Sokolović sent Stefan Nedić-Ćela from Babuna to Vranje to bring new Chetniks and Doksim.

He was one of many teachers who were voivodes. He participated in the Battle of Čelopek (1905), which had been glorified as a great victory. In 1906 he lost his teacher wage.

After the guerrilla war, he went to Mount Athos, where he worked as the estate manager of the Hilandar. He returned to Macedonia and married, then worked as a principal at Serbian schools in Gevgelija. After that, he went to Greece and Malta and worked in trade; Doksim spoke Greek and Turkish since youth, and later taught himself Arabic and Italian.

When the First Balkan War started, he immediately took up arms and founded his own band, and joined vojvoda Vojin Popović-Vuk, at the front of the Serbian Army. Prior to the start of the First Balkan War, Chetniks gathered in Vranje from several regions: 160 in Vranje and 30 on the Kozjak with the voivodes Babunski, Ćela, Dolgač, Trpko, Dane, Vanđel, Doksim and Cakić; there were also 60 Chetniks which readied for Poreče, led by Vojvoda Vuk. These bands were the first to have crossed the border, cleaned the ground, built bridges and prepared important positions such as Kozjak, Stracin, and others. Doksim fought the Ottomans at Kozjak. The bands were also accompanied by armed peasants, thus numbering four groups of around 250 men. The Chetniks were the first to enter Prilep, then fought in the front lines in the battles for Bitola and Kičevo. Doksim died on the second day of the battle of Kumanovo. He was buried on a hill above the village of Mlado Nagoričane.

== See also ==
- List of Chetnik voivodes
