= Sreten Rajković-Rudnički =

Sreten Rajković or Sreten Rudnički (Vojkovci, Principality of Serbia, 8 November 1874 - Dušanovac, Kingdom of Yugoslavia, 22 March 1940) was a Serbian Chetnik voivode and Infantry Colonel.

== Biography ==
He was born on 8 November 1874 in the village of Vojkovci in the h mining district (hence the sobriquet Rudnički). Upon graduation from the Military Academy in Belgrade, he received the rank of second lieutenant in 1899.

== Chetnik action ==
He was among the first who joined the Serbian Chetnik Organization that went into action in Old Serbia and Macedonia. He went as an advisor in the autumn of 1904 together with Voivode Gligor Sokolović and his troop (četa). During the spring of 1905, Rudnički was the first instructor who taught Jovan Babunski military skills. On April 8, 1905, the troops of both Babunski and Rudnički crossed the border and after crossing Vardar, Rudnički formed a mountain headquarters in Poreč. One of the major challenges for the Chetniks was crossing the Vardar river, where the Turkish troops guarded the bridges. Sreten Rajković-Rudnički solved the problem by creating a distraction—getting local peasants to fire random gunshots a kilometer or two away, thus forcing the Turks to leave their guard post. The Chetniks then would safely cross the river from the Serbian to the Ottoman side. Because of his courage, skill and patience, he gained the utmost respect of his subordinates, peers, and superiors, the High Command. From 1905 until the end of the Chetnik action he held the position of Chief Secretary of the Central Chetnik Committee. He was the first commander of the Mountain Staff in the West Povardarje, in Poreč.

== The Balkan Wars, World War I and after ==
He was promoted to major in the First Balkan War. During the Second Balkan War in 1913 he commanded a battalion and also during the Great War in 1914 he was in command of a battalion. In 1915 he was put in command of a regiment. Sreten Rudnički was seriously wounded on 8 November 1915 during the withdrawal of the army from Serbia. After his recovery in 1919, Rudnički took command of a border section for three years. He was promoted to the rank of colonel and became commander of the Kosovo-Mitrovica military district. After retirement, he lived for some time in Skopje.

== See also ==
- List of Chetnik voivodes
