= Tasa Donić =

Serbian Chetnik officer

Tasa Donić also known as Tasa Donić-Smederevac (Serbian Cyrillic: Таса Донић; Orašac near Smederevo, Principality of Serbia, 1863 - Belgrade, Serbia, Kingdom of Yugoslavia, 4 July 1939) was a participant in the Serbian liberation wars of 1912–1918.

During the defence of Belgrade 1914–1915. he commanded the Banat Chetnik detachment with the unofficial title of a duke (voivode). They operated on the front from Pančevo to Belgrade, occupying the Danube islands, Štefanac, Čakljanac and Ada Huja.

He died as the president of the Association of Old Serbian Volunteers. He was buried in Smederevo in 1939.

== See also ==
- List of Chetnik voivodes
