= Vlada Voskar =

Serbian Chetnik voivode

Vladimir "Vlada" T. Milanović, nicknamed Vlada Voskar (Arandjelovac, Principality of Serbia, 1880 – Siberia, Russia, before 1922) was a Serbian Chetnik voivode from Arandjelovac. He was a member of Voivode Vojislav Tankosić's band (1903-1912). After participating in the Balkan Wars and World War I, he joined the First Serbian Volunteer Division in Odessa and continued fighting against the Bolsheviks in the White movement. That was the last record of him.

As a member of the Serbian Chetnik band, Vlada Voskar and his fellow volunteers were under the command of Vojislav Tankosić, one of the most important Chetnik voivodes at the time. They went to Skopje, Bitola, and Thessaloniki in the winter of 1903–04, where they organized Chetnik action in the struggle for Macedonia. Voskar also participated in the victory on Čelopek near Kumanovo on 16 April 1905, part of the četa (unit) of vojvoda Savatije Milošević. Voskar went to Belgrade after Tankosić disbanded the Chetnik volunteers in late July 1908.

Among the first to join the Chetniks in the Balkan Wars, Voskar chose Tankosić's Laplje Chetnik detachment. The detachment began operations in the Turkish-controlled territory two days before the outbreak of the war, at the border post (karaula) at Merdar, where the Chetniks and Albanian Kachaks skirmished into the first battle of the war. The fighting evolved on its own, obviously, without headquarters' approval. Voskar and his comrades at arms fought for three days until the Serbian Army came and brought victory. Tankosić's Chetniks were among the first to liberate Priština from the Ottoman Turks.

After the outbreak of World War I, when Jovan Babunski formed the Sava Chetnik detachment, which was then placed under the command of Major Vojislav Tankosić, Voskar's unit went on to fight the Austro-Hungarians in the late summer of 1914 and later destroyed a railway bridge on the Sava River to prevent Austro-Hungarian forces from crossing it. It took the Austrians and the Central Powers three attempts at invading Serbia in late 1915 to reach their goal. During the Serbian army's retreat through Albania, the Montenegrin Army that protected the retreat of Serbian forces defeated the Austrians on 7 January 1916 in the Battle of Mojkovac. This allowed the Serbian army and civilians to reach Corfu and eventually Salonika, where they met up with expeditionary forces from several countries, including France, Italy, Great Britain, Russia, and Greece, the so-called Allied Army of the Orient.

In February 1916, the Serbian Supreme Command at Corfu issued a directive to Colonel Stevan Hadžić (appointing him as Commander) to leave for Imperial Russia, in order to form the First Serbian Volunteer Division. Hadžić took several volunteers with him, among them Vlada Voskar, an experienced Chetnik, before leaving for Odessa, they made a stop-over in Iaşi where Voskar joined up with Lieutenant-Colonel Aleksandar Srb, Magarašević, and Pavković who become prominent commanders in the ranks of the First Serbian Volunteer Division and later in the White movement. Voskar went on to fight in Chita, Zabaykalsky Krai, Krasnoyarsk, Tyumen, Tobolsk Kremlin, Novi Nikolaevsk (Novosibirsk) and Vladivostok. The last record we have of him is in Russia during the Russian Civil War.

== See also ==
- List of Chetnik voivodes
