= Brana Jovanović =

Serbian chetnik commander (1883–1905)

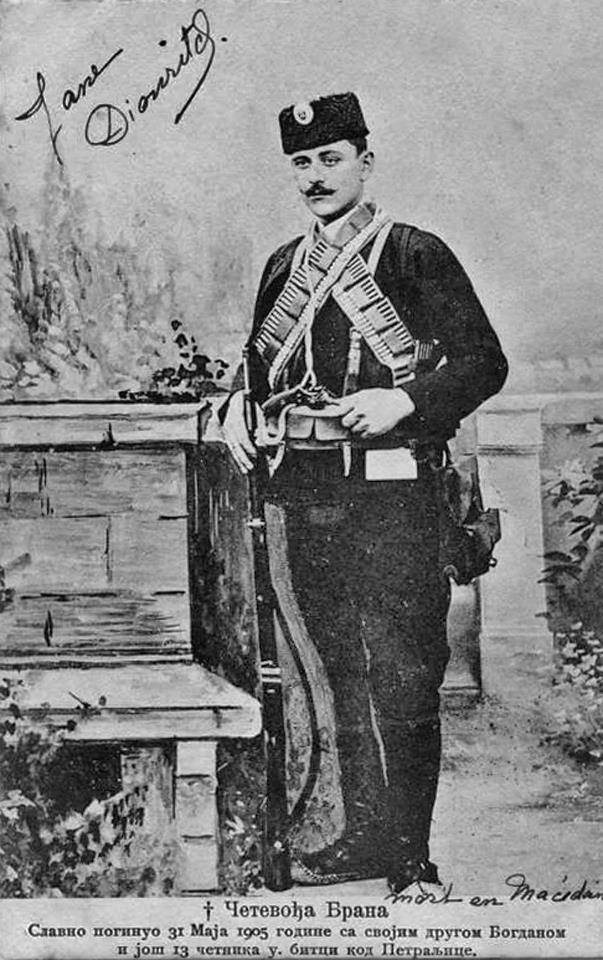
- Born: Branivoje Jovanović; May 23, 1883; Kisiljevo, Kingdom of Serbia (now Serbia)
- Died: May 30, 1905 (22 years); Petraljica, Ottoman Empire (now R. Macedonia)
- Military career
- Allegiance: (Kingdom of Serbia) Serbian Army (1903–05); Serbian Chetnik Organization (1903–05)
- Service years: 1903–05
- Nickname: Brana
- Conflicts: Serbian operation in Macedonia

Branivoje Jovanović (Serbian Cyrillic: Бранивоје Јовановић; Kisiljevo, near Požarevac, 23 May 1883 - Petraljica, near Kumanovo, 30 May 1905), known by the nom de guerre Brana (Брана), was a Chetnik vojvoda (commander).

== Life ==
He was born in Kisiljevo, near Požarevac on 23 May 1883. He graduated from the gymnasium in Belgrade and Šabac and studied military tactics at the Military Academy in Belgrade before joining the Serbian Chetnik Organization. He was among the first Chetniks who crossed the border over to the Ottoman territory. He participated in the Fight on Čelopek. Brana and his compatriots Bogdan Jugović Hajnc, Novica Leovac, Petar Poptašković, and others were in the village of Petraljica when Turks who had been tipped of their location surrounded them. The Chetniks locked themselves in two houses, which the Turks set aflame. Brana and his band were burnt to death. His remains were excavated the next day and buried by the Petraljica church. The events were recorded in poetry.

== See also ==
- List of Chetnik voivodes

== Sources ==
- Blažarić, Pavle (2006). Božica Mladenović (ed.). Memoari. Institut za srpsku kulturu. ISBN 9788682797500.
