= Tasa Konević =

- Born: 1872; Krapa, Ottoman Empire (close to Makedonski Brod, now North Macedonia)
- Died: 1916 (aged 43–44)
- Military career
- Allegiance: Internal Macedonian Revolutionary Organization (?1900–1903); Serbian Chetnik Organization (1903–1916) and (Kingdom of Serbia) Serbian Army
- Service years: 1903–1916
- Nickname: Priest Tasa (pop Tasa)
- Unit: Krapa band
- Conflicts: Macedonian Struggle

Tasa Konević Apostolović (Serbian: Таса Коневић Апостоловић; d. 1916) was an Orthodox priest and Macedonian Serb Chetnik from Krapa in Poreče. He was the son of a local Serb chief, Kone Apostolović, who was the leader of the Prilep Serbs at the end of the 19th century, and one of the richest in the village. Priest Tasa was the protector of Serbdom in Poreče and led the local guerrilla organization. He participated in the Ilinden Uprising (July–August 1903), orchestrated by the Bulgarian-organized Internal Macedonian Revolutionary Organization (IMRO), with a Serb band. After the Kokošinje slaughters (July–October 1904) and IMRO and exarchists attack on Macedonian Serbs, he organized the village self-defense units and joined Gligor Sokolović and his neighbour Trenko Rujanović, of the Serbian Chetnik Organization. Tasa defended and administrated the village throughout the Macedonian Struggle. An important event was the attack on Krapa by combined bands of the IMRO, which ended in the Battle of Šuplji Kamen won by the Serbian Chetniks. Tasa was murdered in 1916 when the occupying Bulgarian Army executed hundreds of Serb leaders from Poreče.

== Annotations ==
1. Name: His most used name is Tasa Konević (Таса Коневић), also spelled Tase (Тасе Коневић). Konević is a patronymic, from his father, Kone Apostolović. Tase's family name in Serbian is Apostolović (Апостоловић).

== See also ==
- List of Chetnik voivodes
- Kole Rašić
- Rista Ognjanović
- Dragoljub Urosevic-Podrinac

== Sources ==
- Društvo "Sveti Sava" (2009). "BRATSTVO XIII" (PDF) (in Serbian). Belgrade. Archived from the original (PDF) on 2015-09-24.
- Trbić, Vasilije (1996). Memoari: 1898-1912 (in Serbian). Kultura. ISBN 9788678010132.
