= Košino =

Košino / Koshino Кошино
- Village
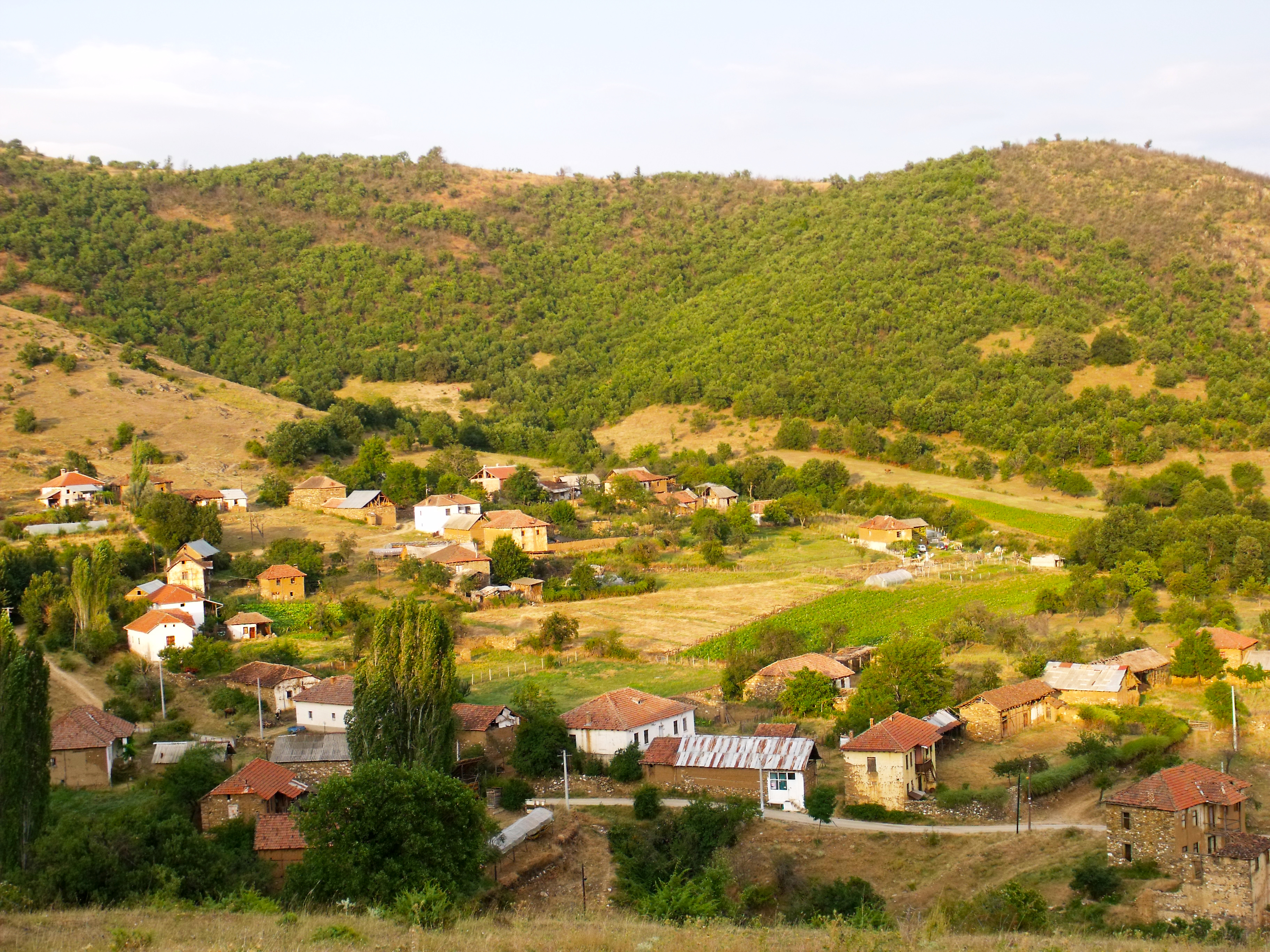
- View of the village

- Location within North Macedonia
- Country: North Macedonia
- Region: Pelagonia
- Municipality: Dolneni
- Elevation: 694 m (2,277 ft)

Population (2021)
  - Total: 66
- Time zone: UTC+1 (CET)
- Area code: +38948

Koshino (Macedonian: Кошино) is a village in the municipality of Dolneni, North Macedonia.

== Demographics ==
According to the 2021 census, the village had a total of 66 inhabitants. Ethnic groups in the village include:

- Macedonians 60
- Albanians 2
- Others 4

Year	Macedonian	Albanian	Turks	Romani	Vlachs	Serbs	Bosniaks	Others	Total
2002	92	...	...	...	...	...	...	...	92
2021	60	2	...	...	...	...	...	4	66
