= Jovan Dolgač =

Serbian Chetnik commander in Macedonia

Vojvoda Jovan Dolgač
- Born: Jovan Cvetković; 1860; Košino, Ottoman Empire (now Dolneni Municipality, North Macedonia)
- Died: 1915 (aged 54–55); Košino
- Military career
- Allegiance: IMRO (1903–1904); Serbian Chetniks (1904–10); (Kingdom of Serbia) Serbian Army (1912–13)
- Service years: 1903–1913
- Rank: vojvoda
- Nickname: Dolgač
- Unit: Prilep

Jovan Cvetković (Serbian Cyrillic: Јован Цветковић; 1860–1915), known as Jovan Dolgač (Јован Долгач), was a Serbian Chetnik commander in Macedonia, who also participated in the Balkan Wars and World War I in the Chetnik detachments of the Serbian Army. In Bulgaria he is considered a Bulgarian renegade who switched sides, i.e. (sic) Serboman.

== Life ==
Dolgač was born in the village of Košino on the Babuna mountain. As a youngster, he smuggled weapons together with his brother Zmejko. The brothers subsequently joined the Internal Macedonian Revolutionary Organization (IMRO), in order to fight against the Turks and Albanian kachaks.

Dolgač stayed with the IMRO until 1904, disappointed with the Bulgarian attacks within the organization against Serb villages around Prilep. Together with Gligor Sokolović he joined the Serbian Chetnik Organization and became a commander (vojvoda) of a band active in Prilep. He killed his own brother Zmejko when he refused to join the Serbian Organization. He participated in the battles of Mukos (1905), Krapa (1906), which were in the region of the Chief Staff of Western Povardarje. He participated in the First Balkan War where he distinguished himself in the battles of Kumanovo and the fighting on Mukos. In the work of Grigorije Božović, "Striko Dolgač" (Uncle Dolgač) was displayed as being a type of old Christian hajduk, who refused to believe that a Serb Muslim in his band could be a Serb and not a Turk; he became the embodiment of the Balkan understanding of religion as a divider of nations. Because of an attack on a Turkish wedding in 1913, he was arrested by the Serbian authorities but was eventually freed in order to fight in the Second Balkan War. In 1915, at an old age, he was appointed the village chief. He was murdered the same year by the IMRO.

== See also ==
- List of Chetnik voivodes
