= Ratevo =

Ratevo Ратево
- Village
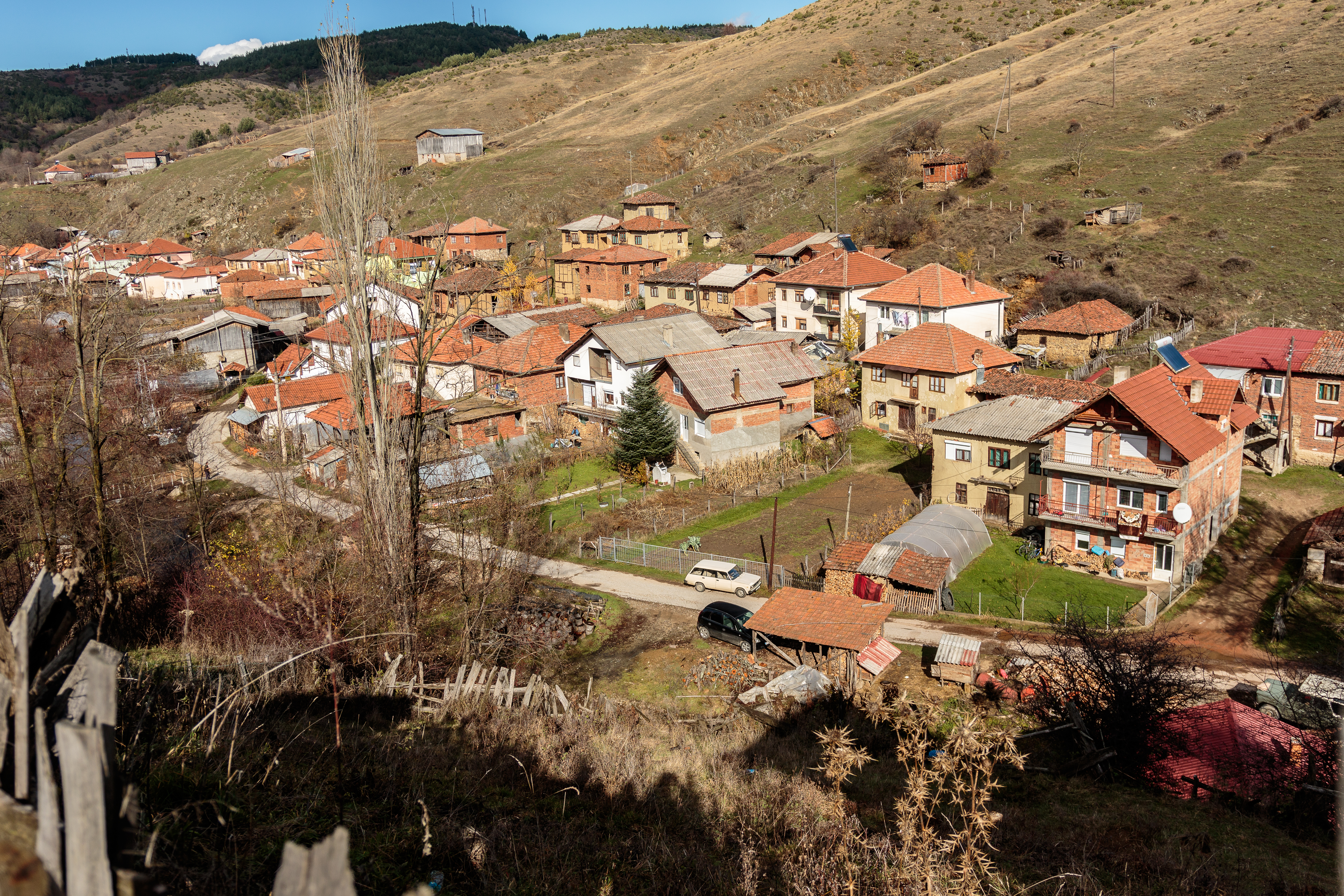
- Panoramic view of the village Ratevo

- Location within North Macedonia
- Country: North Macedonia
- Region: Eastern
- Municipality: Berovo

Population (2002)
  - Total: 844
- Time zone: UTC+1 (CET)

Ratevo (Macedonian: Ратево) is a village in the Berovo Municipality of North Macedonia.

== Demographics ==
According to the 2002 census, the village had a total of 844 inhabitants. Ethnic groups in the village include:

- Macedonians 844
