= Pasjane =

Pasjane: Pasjan or Pasjani (Albanian) Pasjane or Пасјане (Serbian)
- Village
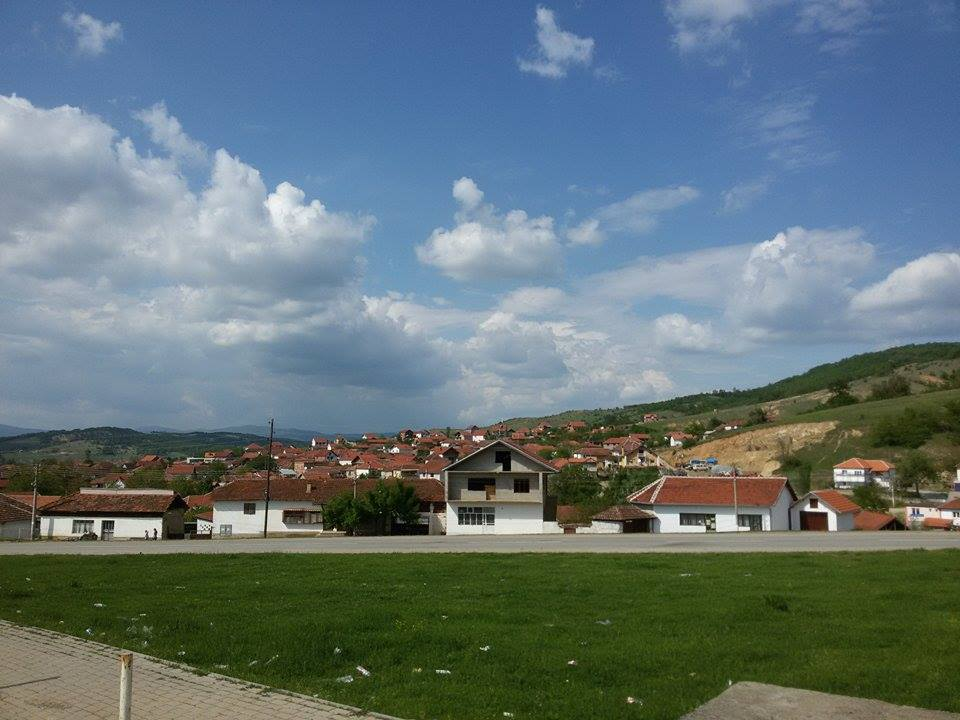
- Pasjane Village

- Location in Kosovo
- Coordinates: 42°24′25″N 21°29′44″E
- Country: Kosovo
- District: Gjilan
- Municipality: Partesh

Population (2024)
  - Total: 1,177
- Time zone: UTC+1 (CET)
  - Summer (DST): UTC+2 (CEST)

Pasjane (Serbian Cyrillic: Пасјане) or Pasjani (Albanian: Pasjan), is a village in the municipality of Parteš in Kosovo. It is inhabited by a majority of ethnic Serbs.

== History ==
The village was mentioned as Pasjan (Serbian Cyrillic: Пасјан) in the Ottoman defter of 1455 of the Vlk Vilayet (Vilayet of Vuk), encompassing most of Vuk Branković's former territory. At that time the village was populated exclusively by Serbs, on the forehead with priest, living in 94 households.

In 1907, there was a battle between Serbian Chetnik Organization and Kachaks In the villages church.

In the 18th-Century, Bosiljka Rajčić lived in the village of Pasjane, where she was brutally attacked, beaten, tortured and mutilated to death at the age of 17. On 3 May 2018 she was proclaimed a Saint by the Serbian Orthodox Church.
