= Makedonski Brod Municipality =

Municipality of North Macedonia

Coordinates: 41.52°N 21.23°E

Makedonski Brod Municipality Општина Македонски Брод
- Urban municipality
- Flag Coat of arms

- Country: North Macedonia
- Region: Southwestern
- Municipal seat: Makedonski Brod

Government
  - Mayor: Žarko Risteski (VMRO-DPMNE)

Area
  - Total: 888.97 km^{2} (343.23 sq mi)

Population
  - Total: 5,889
  - Density: 8.03/km^{2} (20.8/sq mi)
- Time zone: UTC+1 (CET)
- Postal code: 6530
- Area code: 045
- Vehicle registration: MB
- Website: http://www.MBrod.gov.mk/

Makedonski Brod (Macedonian: Македонски Брод [maˈkɛdɔnski brɔt]) is a municipality in western North Macedonia, named after the town of Makedonski Brod, where the municipal seat is located. Makedonski Brod Municipality is part of the Southwestern Statistical Region.

== Geography ==
The municipality borders

- Želino Municipality and Brvenica Municipality to the north,
- Studeničani and Sopište municipalities to the northeast,
- Čaška and Dolneni municipalities to the southeast,
- Kruševo Municipality to the south,
- Plasnica Municipality to the southwest,
- Kičevo Municipality to the west, and
- Gostivar Municipality to the northwest.

The municipality includes the Kozjak Hydro Power Plant and the associated artificial lake, the largest such lake in the country.

== Demographics ==
By the August 2004 territorial division of Macedonia, the rural Samokov Municipality was attached to Makedonski Brod Municipality, which then totaled 7,141 inhabitants. Before the merge,

- The municipality of Makedonski Brod had 5,517 inhabitants in 1994 and 5,558 in 2002
- Samokov Municipality had 2,057 inhabitants in 1994 and 1,553 in 2002
- In the 2021 North Macedonia census, the municipality of Makedonski Brod had 5,889 people.

	2002		2021	
	Number	%	Number	%
TOTAL	7,141	100	5,889	100
Macedonians	6,927	97	5,367	91.14
Turks	181	2.53	241	4.09
Albanians			38	0.65
Roma	3	0.04	18	0.31
Serbs	22	0.31	10	0.17
Bosniaks	1	0.01	1	0.02
Other / Undeclared / Unknown	7	0.11	10	0.16
Persons for whom data are taken from administrative sources			204	3.46

== Notable people ==
- Gjurčin Naumov - Pljakot, revolutionary, born in Slansko
- Tasa Konević, Macedonian Serb Chetnik, born in Krapa
- Micko Krstić, Macedonian Serb Chetnik, born in Latovo
- Zafir Premčević, Macedonian Serb Chetnik, born in Ljupšte
- Trenko Rujanović, Macedonian Serb Chetnik, born in Krapa
- Ilija Slanštanec, writer and historian, born in Slansko
- Dane Stojanović, Macedonian Serb Chetnik, born in Krapa
- Božidar Vidoeski, linguist, born in Zvečan
