= Trenko Rujanović =

Macedonian Serb Chetnik and Bulgarian apostate

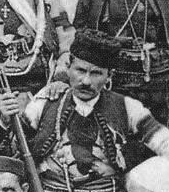
- Vojvoda Trenko
- Born: c. 1870; Krapa, Ottoman Empire (now Makedonski Brod, North Macedonia)
- Died: after 1910
- Military career
- Allegiance: Supreme Macedonian Committee (1895–1907); Internal Macedonian Revolutionary Organization (1897–1904); Serbian Chetnik Organization (1904–1910) and (Kingdom of Serbia) Serbian Army
- Service years: 1895–1910
- Nickname: "Vojvoda Trenko"
- Unit: Krapa band
- Conflicts: Macedonian Struggle

Trenko Rujanović (Serbian Cyrillic: Тренко Рујановић; born c. 1870), known as Vojvoda Trenko (Војвода Тренко), was a Macedonian Serb Chetnik and Bulgarian apostate.

== Life ==
Rujanović was born in the village of Krapa, in the Poreče region, part of the Ottoman Empire (now R. Macedonia). His father was Jovan Rujanović.

In 1895, he participated into the pro-Bulgarian Supreme Macedonian Committee chetas' action. Later he joined the Bulgarian-organized Internal Macedonian Revolutionary Organization (IMRO) and fought in the Kičevo region. In 1899/1900 he personally sought the Serbian consuls for the establishment of a Serbian revolutionary organization and Serbian armed bands.

In 1904, he left IMRO and joined the Serbian Chetnik Organization and established one of the first Serbian bands. He participated in the battle against Stefan Dimitrov at the village of Orešje (April 1905) when the Serbian bands won the battle at Oreškim livadama against the IMRO. Also, he participated in the battle at Kurtov kamen (1907). After the Young Turk Revolution (1908), he left his weapon until further Young Turk pressing, reactivating his band in 1910.

== Gallery ==
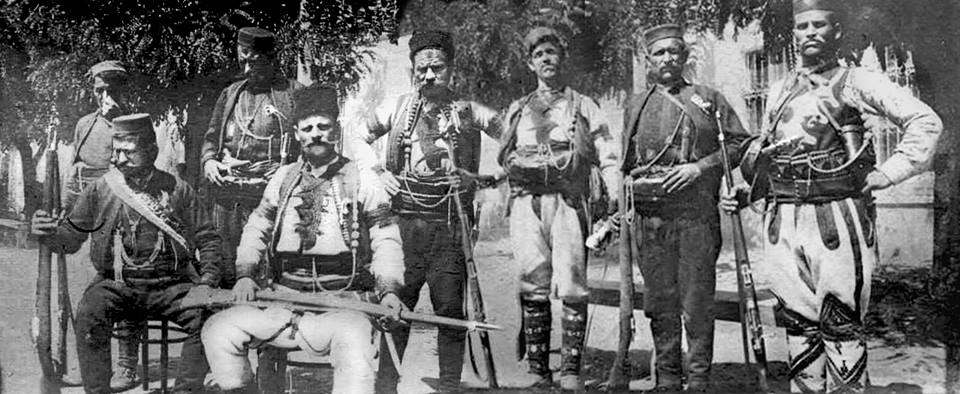
Chetniks during the Hurriyet (1908). Rujanović standing in the centre.

== See also ==
- Tasa Konević
- List of Chetnik voivodes

== Sources ==
- Krakov, Stanislav (1990) [1930]. Plamen četništva (in Serbian). Belgrade: Hipnos.
- Trbić, Vasilije (1996). Memoari: 1898-1912 (in Serbian). Kultura. ISBN 9788678010132.
