= Saints Cyril and Methodius Serbian Orthodox Seminary =

Eastern Orthodox seminary in Prizren, Kosovo

- Српска православна богословија Светих Кирила и Методија
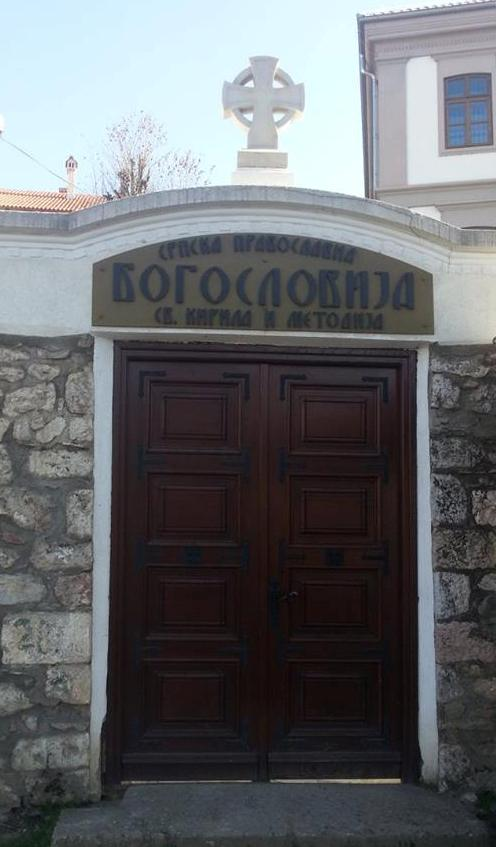

Location
- 6 Vatra Shqiptare; Prizren; Kosovo
- Coordinates: 42°12′33″N 20°44′32″E

Information
- Type: Seminary
- Religious affiliation: Eastern Orthodox
- Established: 1872
- Language: Serbian
- Campus: Urban
- Website: Official website

Saints Cyril and Methodius Serbian Orthodox Seminary (Serbian: Српска православна богословија Светих Кирила и Методија, romanized: Srpska pravoslavna bogoslovija Svetih Kirila i Metodija), also known as the Prizren Seminary (Serbian: Призренска богословија, romanized: Prizrenska bogoslovija), is a secondary educational institution of the Serbian Orthodox Church located in Prizren, Kosovo which prepares future clergymen for service in the Serbian Orthodox Church.

== History ==
Serbian merchant Sima Andrejević founded the seminary in order to train men to serve as Orthodox clergymen and teachers. The teaching process in this school started in 1871 and the following year a dormitory for students and another one for professors were built.

The seminary became the center of Serbian culture and education in the Ottoman Empire in early 20th century. Located in the downtown of Prizren, the school soon came to be the cell of a first university in Kosovo, and this enabled the Serb population, to advance educationally and culturally at a time when Albanians were unable to access education, except for some Koran schools in Turkish.

The seminary was looted by Albanians during World War II at a time when many Serbian Orthodox churches and monasteries were destroyed. During the 1960s, the seminary reached its peak and counted 400 students. In 1970 it had 129 students and 12 teachers.

In the aftermath of the Kosovo War, the majority of Serbs were forced to flee Kosovo, and those who were unable to, took refuge at the premises of the Seminary. They eventually went for Serbia a month later. After the refugee Albanians returned to Prizren, they burned and damaged Serbian buildings, including the Seminary.

In the 2004 unrest in Kosovo ethnic Albanians attacked the Seminary. The mob set the seminary on fire, with people inside, and beat several elderly people with one person died. The German KFOR troops failure to protect the Serbs was marked as a main security failures of the 2004 unrest. The UNMIK in Prizren stated that 56 Serb homes and 5 historical churches that were burnt down could have been prevented by better reaction of the KFOR command.

In 2007, reconstruction of the Seminary premises were conducted, restoring it to its former state.

== Courses and curriculum ==
Seminary education lasts five years. Students study Bible (Old Testament, New Testament), Bible history, history of the Christianity, church singing, catechism, apology of faith, Liturgy, patrology, dogmatics, Canon law, pedagogy, homily, history of religion with Sects, History of the Serbian Orthodox Church, philosophy, ethics with Asceticism, and computer science. In addition to Serbian, students also study Russian, Greek, English, and Church Slavonic.

== Alumni ==
- Irinej, Serbian Patriarch
- Doksim Mihailović, guerrilla fighter
- Lazar Kujundžić, guerrilla fighter
- Jovan Grković-Gapon, guerrilla fighter
- Rade Radivojević, guerrilla fighter

== Sources ==
- Elsie, Robert (2004). Historical Dictionary of Kosova. Scarecrow Press. ISBN 978-0-8108-5309-6.
- Bouckaert, Peter (2004). Failure to Protect: Anti-minority Violence in Kosovo, March 2004. Human Rights Watch. pp. 18, 53–57. GGKEY:XX8XTDK4E19.
