= Rista Starački =

Serbian Chetnik commander

Vojvoda Rista Starački
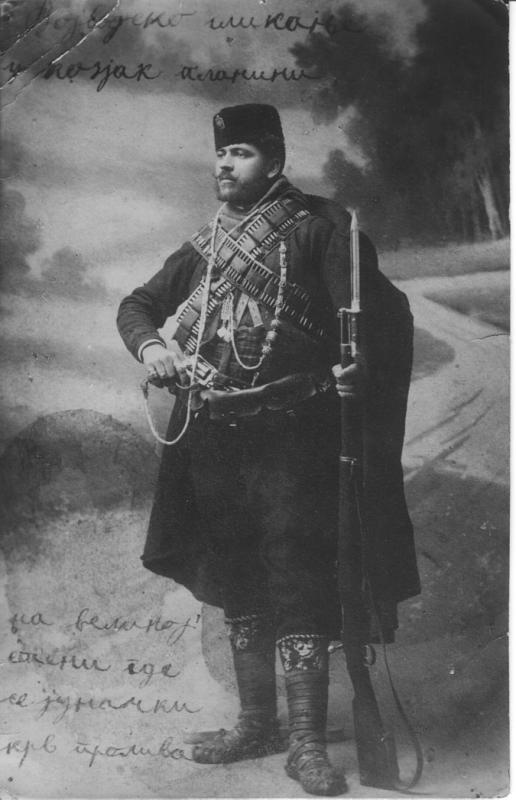
- Rista Starački in Chetnik gear.
- Born: Rista Stevanović; 1870; Starac, Ottoman Empire (now Serbia)
- Died: 1940 (aged 70); Samoljica, Kingdom of Yugoslavia (now Serbia)
- Military career
- Allegiance: Serbian Chetnik Organization; Kingdom of Serbia
- Service years: 1904–08
- Nickname: Starački

Rista Stevanović (Serbian Cyrillic: Риста Стевановић, c. 1870–1940), known by his nom de guerre, the demonym Starački (Риста Старачки), was a Serbian Chetnik commander. He was among the first Chetniks on the Kozjak together with commanders Jovan Dovezenski, Krsta Preševski, Spasa Garda, Đorđe Skopljanče, Vanđel Skopljanče and Ilija Jovanović-Pčinjski.

== Life ==
Stevanović was born in Starac, near Preševo in the Ottoman Empire (now in Serbia). He was a teacher by profession.

After Vasilije Trbić had organized the self-defence of the village of Jablanica, he went on to Starac, which already had 30 organized and loyal fighters, from which he chose Rista Starački as commander.

He was among the first Chetniks on the Kozjak together with commanders Jovan Dovezenski, Krsta Preševski, Spasa Garda, Đorđe Skopljanče, Vanđel Skopljanče and Ilija Jovanović-Pčinjski.

He was later excluded from the Board, due to foreign influence, and became a night-watch of the Committee in Belgrade. Others that had been excluded for various reasons of insubordination were Jovan Dovezenski, Vanđel Skopljanče, Emilio Milutinović, Jovan Pešić, Vladimir Kovačević and Trenko Rujanović. Despite being excluded, he asked the Central Board several times for a band, though he was always rejected. He left the night-watch and then travelled to Ristovac, Pirot and Kragujevac. It was unlikely that an unemployed could travel that much, so the police soon noticed him. In 1908, he was a member of the Congress as a secretary of priest Novak Ristović. In 1924, he, Janko Pešić and Danilo Dimitrijević opened a shoe factory in Vranje.

He died in Samoljica, Kingdom of Yugoslavia.

== See also ==
- List of Chetnik voivodes

== Sources ==
- Trbić, Vasilije (1996). Memoari: 1898-1912 (in Serbian). Kultura. ISBN 9788678010132.
- Антонијевић, Синиша (2014-01-14). "Вучији синови Пчиње" (in Serbian). Vranje: Vranjske.
- "Затишје уочи балканских ратова". Глас јавности, 17.03.2003., страна: 15.
