= Jovan Dovezenski =

Serbian Chetnik commander

Vojvoda Jovan Dovezenski
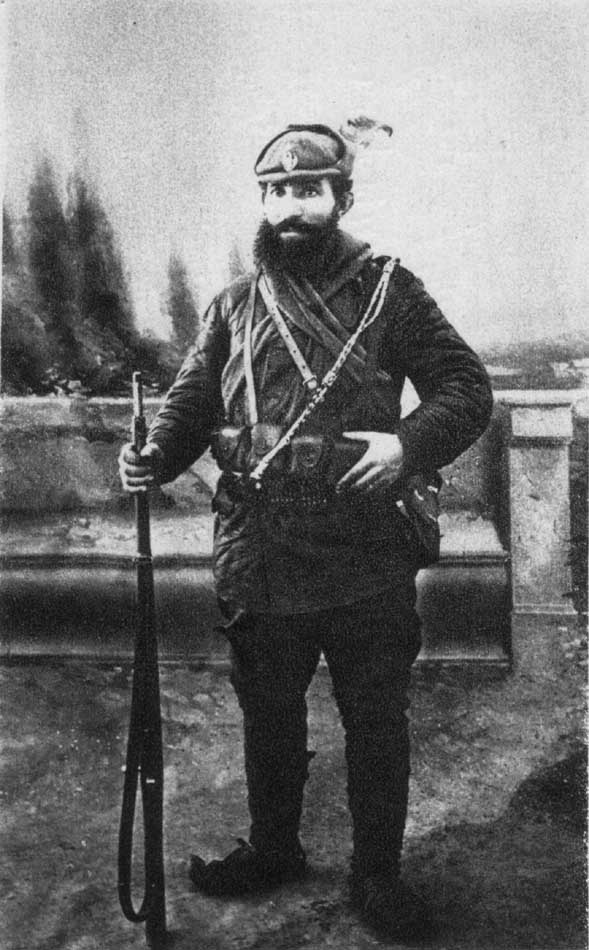
- Dovezenski in Chetnik gear
- Born: Jovan Stanojković; April 8, 1873; Dovezence, Ottoman Empire (now Kumanovo Municipality, R. Macedonia)
- Died: May 2, 1935 (aged 62); Kumanovo
- Military career
- Allegiance: Serbian Chetniks (1904–10); (Kingdom of Serbia) Serbian Army (1912–18)
- Service years: 1904–1918
- Rank: vojvoda
- Nickname: Dovezenski
- Military history: Chetnik Action, Balkan Wars, World War I

Jovan Stanojković (Serbian Cyrillic: Јован Станојковић, 8 April 1873 – 2 May 1935), known by his nom de guerre, the demonym Dovezenski (Довезенски), was a Serbian Chetnik commander (vojvoda), and participant in the Balkan Wars, in the Battle of Kumanovo, and World War I. He was originally a teacher who turned into a guerilla fighter following Bulgarian oppression on Serb people in Macedonia. He rose in ranks and became one of the supreme commanders in Macedonia.

== Early life ==
He was born on April 8, 1873, in Dovezance near Kumanovo, at the time part of the Kumanovo kaza of the Sanjak of Üsküp, Ottoman Empire (now R. Macedonia). He belonged to the Velčevci family. He went to primary school in the nearby village of Murgaš, and in the Gradište Monastery, where they taught in Old Slavonic. By the time of the Serbo-Bulgarian War (1885), he had finished all schools possible in his home region. In 1888, he moved to the Principality of Serbia, for further education. He entered the theological teacher school of the Society of St. Sava, available to youngsters from Old Serbia and Macedonia. Jovan Babunski, a future fellow Chetnik, also went to the same school, among others. In 1897 he became a teacher in his home village. He remained a teacher until March 3, 1904, when he joined the Serbian Chetnik Organization.

== Chetnik Organization ==
Pavle Mladenović established the first local Serb-oriented cheta (band) in Kumanovo in springtime 1903 when the Internal Macedonian Revolutionary Organization (IMRO) started assassinating and murdering people who identified themselves as Serbs in the Kumanovo region. After Mladenović, Jovan Stanojković, who had been a teacher up until then in Rudar, formed a band in the Kumanovo region. He adopted the nom de guerre "Jovan Dovezenski". Dovezenski spontaneously decided to command his band after exarchate commander Atanas Babata massacred Serbs in his village on 11 August 1904. After the establishment of bands in Kumanovo, self-organized bands were established in Skopska Crna Gora and in the Palanka kaza. All of these bands had the objective of self-defense, and they worked independently from one another. In the summer of 1904, resistance to the Bulgarian oppression emerged with the first Serbian-organized secret band in Drimkol, led by Đorđe Cvetković-Drimkolski from Labuništa. Henceforth, the movement was coordinated.

The left side of the Vardar was formed out of locals in the bands of Pavle Mladenović, Dovezenski, and Petko Ilić. Ilija Jovanović, Ljuba Jezdić and Đorđe Skopljanče were among those sent by the Committee across the border. On the night of 22–23 October 1904, Dovezenski's band attacked the village of Beljakovce, where he, according to the Bulgarian sources, killed Bulgarian Exarchist teacher Teodosi Sholyakov, one other man, and two women. In November 1904, Dovezenski came to Vranje where he formed a band, in which, among others, were two youngsters, both from Peć: a border gendarmerie corporal, Kosta Pećanac and a lance sergeant from the NCO school, Đorđe Skopljanče. Dovezenski proved to be a capable organizer and propagandist, and thanks to him, the Chetniks were joined by the bands of Ilinden veteran commanders Krsta Kovačević, Vanđel Skopljanče and Milan Štipljanče.

He organized the Board of Western Povardarje in 1904.

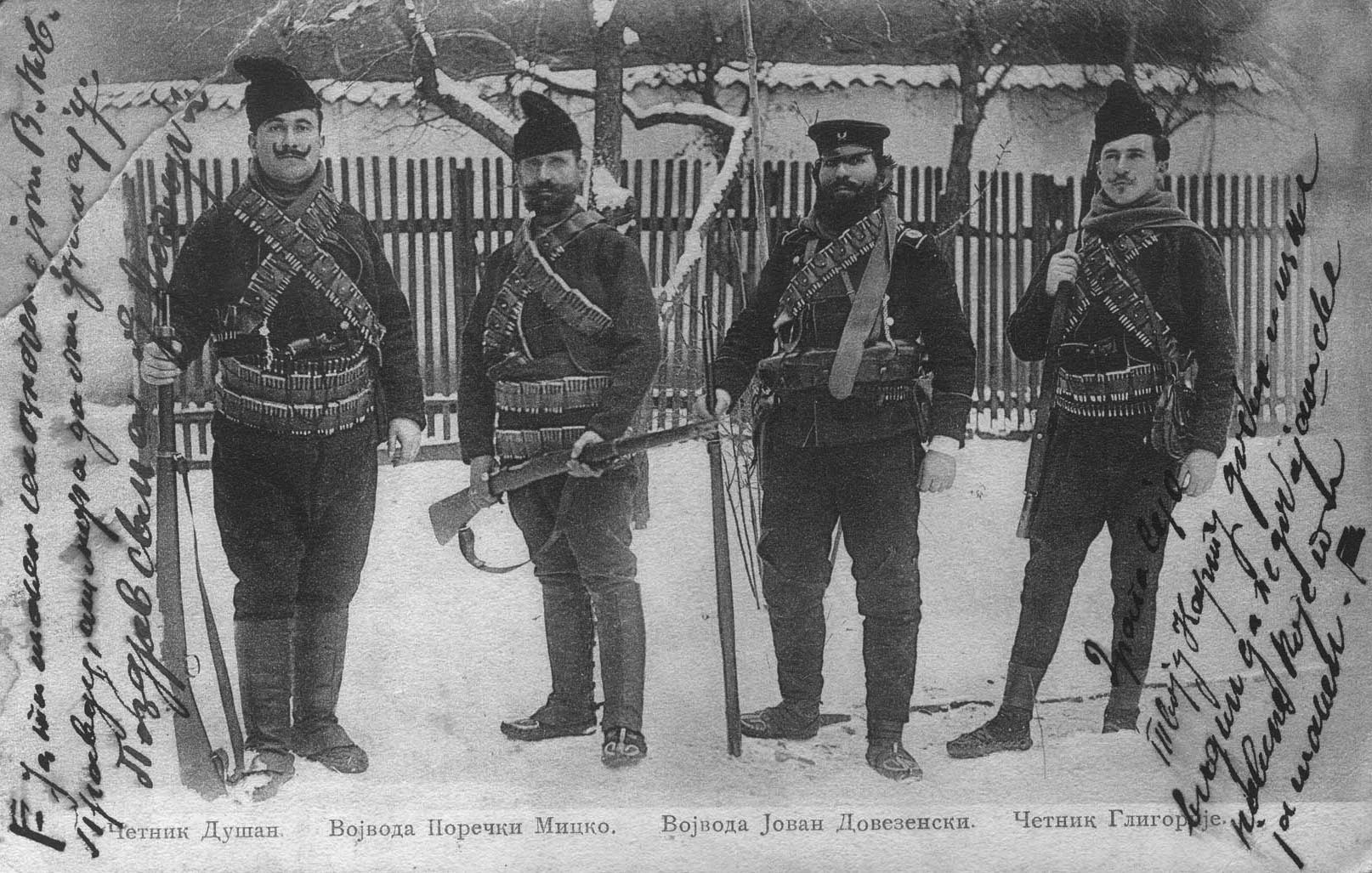
Micko and Dovezenski in the centre, 1904–05

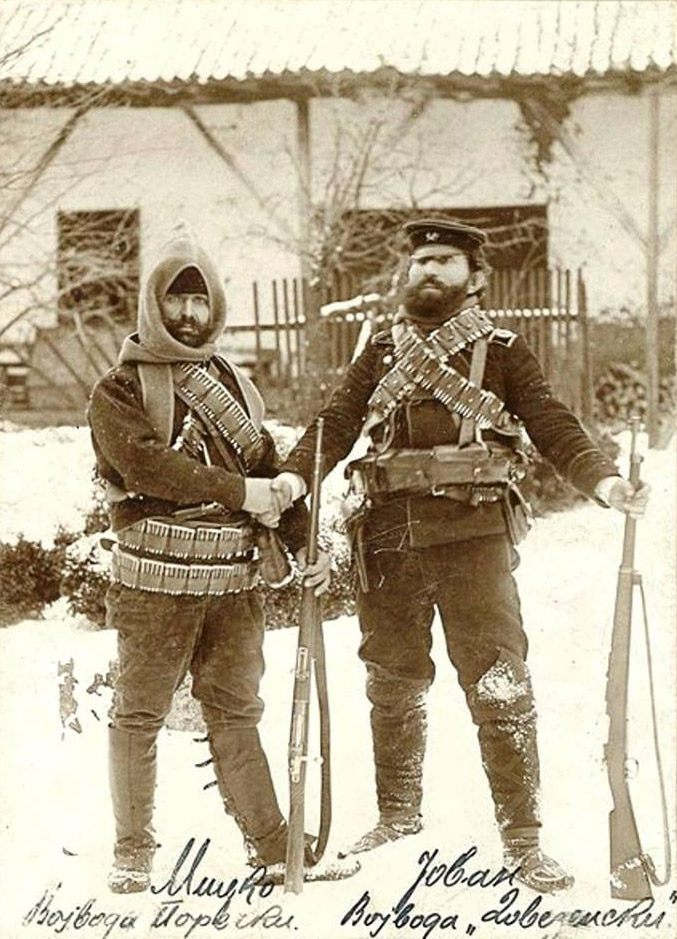
Micko and Dovezenski, 1904–05

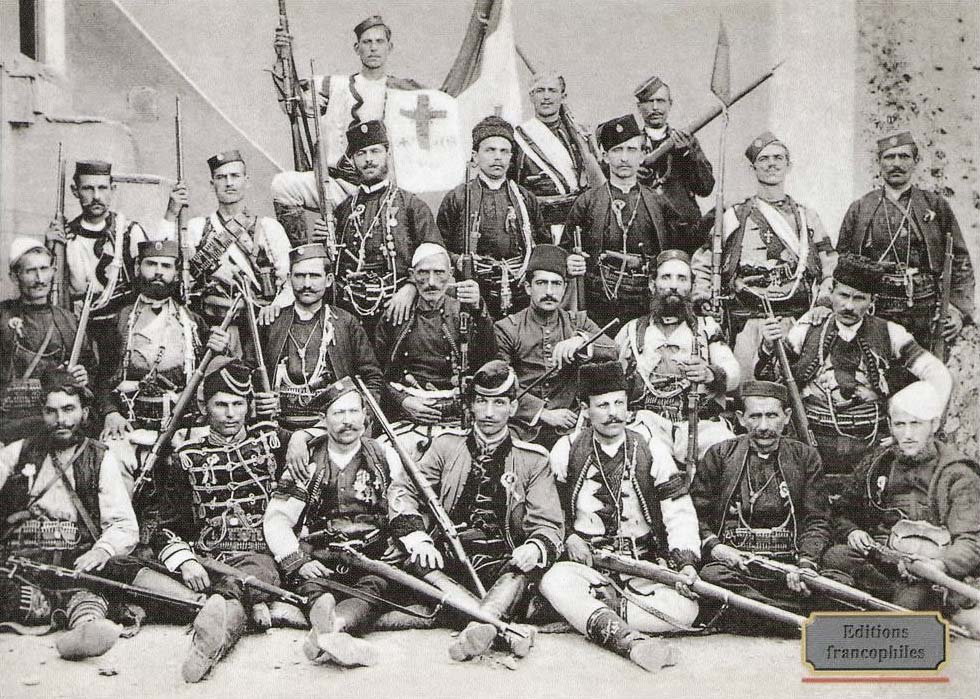
Group photo of Chetnik commanders, during the Young Turk Revolution (1908).

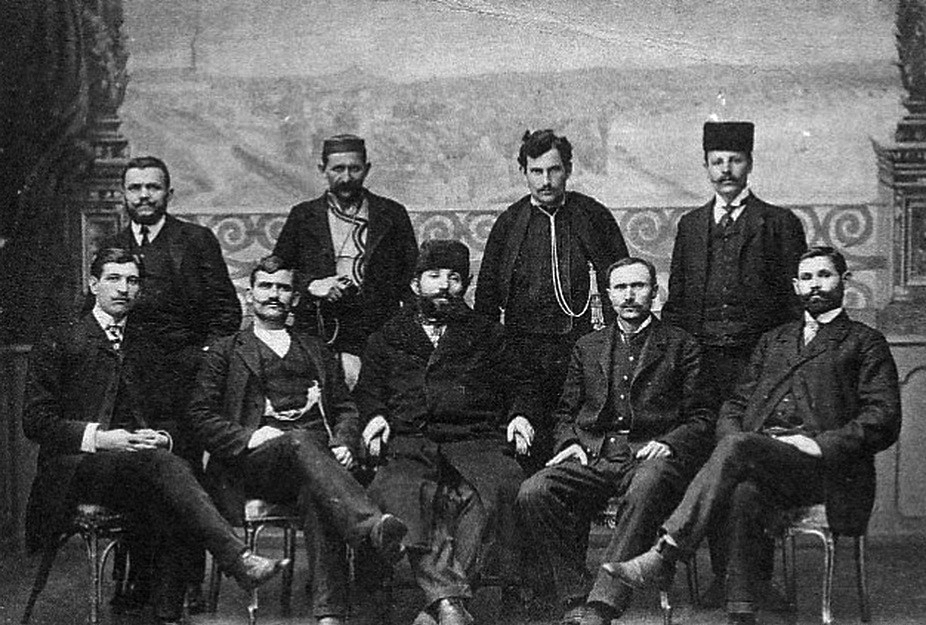
Dovezenski, sitting in the centre, with fellow Chetnik commanders, during the Young Turk Revolution (1908).

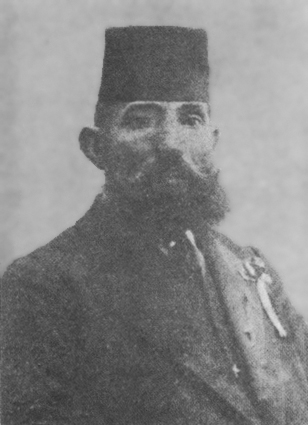
Portrait of Dovezenski, wearing a fez, coat jacket, and white ribbon (1908).

== Balkan Wars ==
After unsuccessful fights with Bulgarian bands, Komenović was replaced with Dovezenski. He participated in the Battle of Kumanovo.

== Later years ==
He was a minister of the National Assembly.

There is a story about Jovan Dovezenski and Deda-Laza Aleksić, both widowers, who were interested in the same widow at a party. Dovezenski first took her to dance, then Aleksić danced with her, better and longer, however, the widow chose Dovezenski.

He died on 2 May 1935 in Kumanovo. His descendants, as those of Jovan Babunski, are surnamed with their Chetnik surnames.

One of his descendants is Nebojša Dovezenski, a researcher and molecular immunologist.

== Awards ==
- Order of the Star of Karađorđe, 4th degree
- Golden Medal for Courage
- Commemorative Medal for the Balkan Wars
- Commemorative Medal for World War I

== Legacy ==
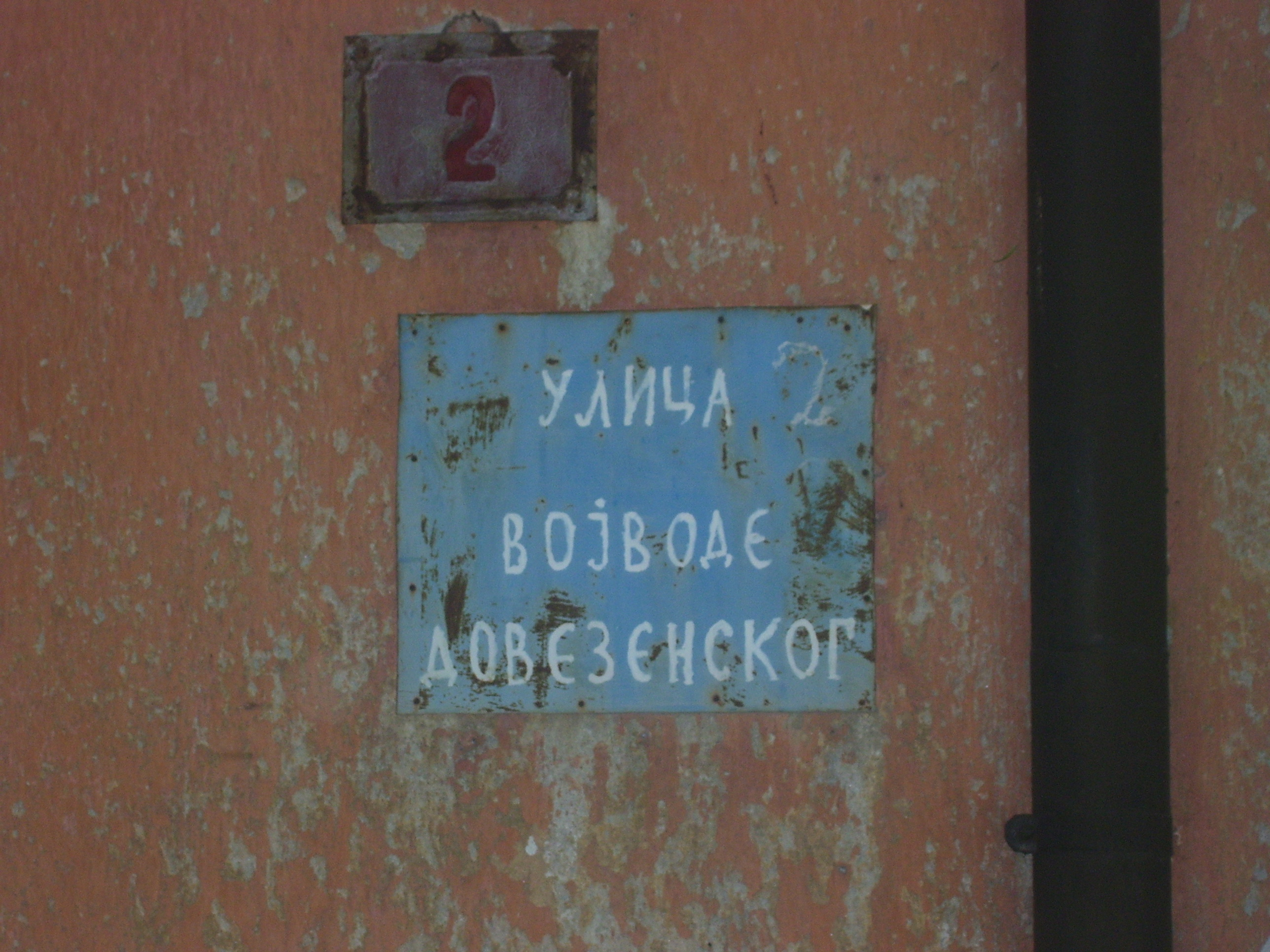
Street in Zvezdara.

A street in Zvezdara, Belgrade is named after him (ul. Vojvode Dovezenskog).

== Annotations ==
- His surname is scarcely spelled Stojković (Стојковић).

== See also ==
- List of Chetnik voivodes

== Sources ==
- Đurić, Veljko Đ.; Mijović, Miličko (1993). Ilustrovana istorija četničkog pokreta.
- Hadži Vasiljević, Jovan (1928). Četnička akcija u Staroj Srbiji i Maćedoniji.
- Ilić, Vladimir (2006). Српска четничка акција 1903-1912. Ecolibri. ISBN 978-86-7905-044-1.
- Jovanović, Aleksa (1937). Spomenica dvadesetogodišnjice oslobodjenja Južne Srbije, 1912-1937. Južna Srbija.
- Krakov, Stanislav (1990) [1930]. Plamen četništva (in Serbian). Belgrade: Hipnos.
- Trbić, Vasilije (1996). Memoari: 1898-1912 (in Serbian). Kultura. ISBN 9788678010132.
