= Ljuba Jezdić =

Serbian chetnik

Ljuba Jezdić–Razvigora
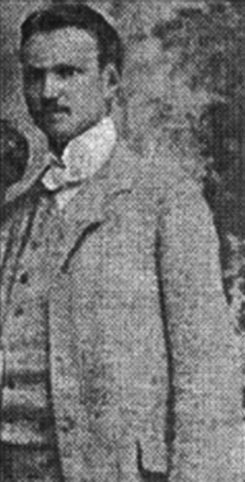
- Ljuba Jezdić in civilian clothing
- Born: 1 October 1884; Loznica, Kingdom of Serbia (now Serbia)
- Died: 15 September 1927 (aged 42); Belgrade, Kingdom of Yugoslavia (now Serbia)
- Military career
- Allegiance: Serbian Chetnik Organization (1903–12) and (Kingdom of Serbia) Serbian Army (1912–18)
- Service years: 1903–1918
- Nickname: "Razvigora"
- Conflicts: Macedonian Struggle

Ljubomir "Ljuba" Jezdić (Serbian Cyrillic: Љубомир "Љуба" Јездић; 1 October 1884 — 15 September 1927), known by his nom de guerre Razvigora (Развигора) was a Serbian Chetnik voivode (military commander) in the Macedonian Struggle, and a lawyer.

== Life ==
=== Early life ===
Jezdić was born in Loznica, Kingdom of Serbia (Western Serbia) on 1 October 1884. The Loznica Jezdići live in Donja Badanja and Brnjac. He finished six grades in the Šabac gymnasium, then entered the Serbian Military Academy, but he was forced to cancel his studies before the end of the third year. He then entered the Law School in Belgrade, a period when he became one of the notable nationalistic youth leaders. He was a fellow student with Dušan Dimitrijević, a future brother-in-arms.

=== Chetnik action (1903–08) ===
He had joined the Serbian Chetnik Organization and later crossed the Serbian-Ottoman border and entered Old Serbia on 1 February 1905, joining the band (cheta) of vojvoda Đorđe Ristić. He then made transfer to the band of Rista Starački. When Starački's was wounded in the hand fighting in Drenak and went and vacated in Serbia, Jezdić became the vojvoda of this unit. He adopted the war name Razvigora, due to the first warm springtime wind, which made the leaves sprout (from razvitak, "sprout" and gora, "forest"). He participated in the great battle with the Ottoman army at Čelopek (16 April 1905).

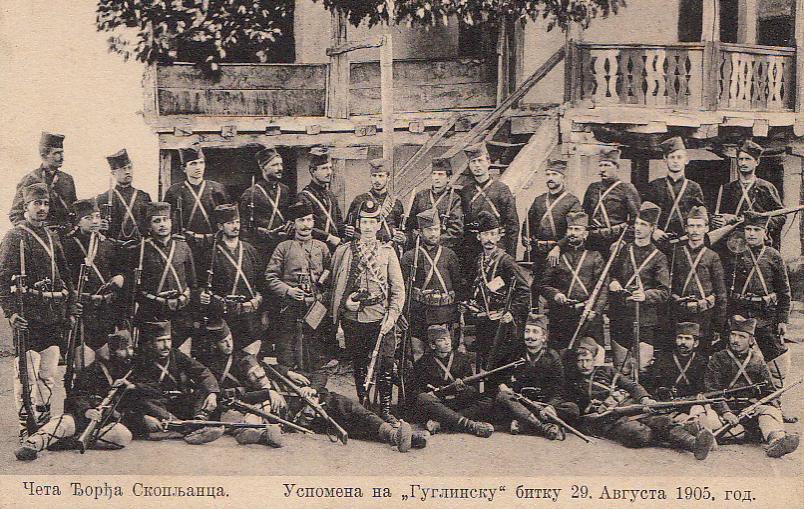
Serbian Chetnik Vojvoda Đorđe Ristić Skopljanče and his četa. Skopljanče in the centre, other notables in the photo include Ljuba Jezdić in the top row, third from the left, and Vojin Popović-Vojvoda Vuk next to him. Photo taken in 1905.

On 28 April 1905, the larger Kragujevac- and Belgrade bands arrived at the Dubočica village, led by Borko Paštrović and Aksentije Bacetović respectively. Ilija Jovanović, Lazar Kujundžić, Pavle Mladenović and Ljuba Jezdić awaited them with their bands.

=== Balkan Wars and First World War (1912–18) ===
He was a sergeant during the Balkan Wars, and in the First World War he was a band commander, and commander of machine gunners in the Yugoslav volunteer regiment. After he fell sick, he was appointed a military delegate in Tunisia. He lived in Belgrade since 1918, working as a lawyer, and died there on 15 September 1927.

== See also ==
- List of Chetnik voivodes

== Sources ==
- Krakov, Stanislav (1990) [1930], Plamen četništva (in Serbian), Belgrade: Hipnos
- Đurić, Veljko Đ.; Mijović, Miličko (1993). Ilustrovana istorija četničkog pokreta. pp. 92–114.
