= Ditko Aleksić =

Serbian guerrilla fighter

Dimitrije "Ditko" Aleksić (Serbian Cyrillic: Димитрије Алексић; died August 4, 1916), was a Serbian guerrilla fighter in Old Serbia and Macedonia during the Macedonian Struggle, and commander in the Balkan Wars and World War I.

== Life ==
Dimitrije Aleksić was born in the village of Osiče in the Kosovo Vilayet of the Ottoman Empire (present-day North Macedonia) in the last quarter of the 19th century. With the establishment of the Serbian Chetnik Organization, his village supported and joined the Serbian Organization. In 1905 he was in the četa (squad) of Đorđe Ristić, Spasa Garda and Krsta Trgoviški. He became vojvoda (duke) in 1911, and with that rank he participated in the Balkan Wars and World War I. He died at the Salonican Front on August 4, 1916.

== Sources ==
- Krakov, Stanislav (1990) [1930]. Plamen četništva (in Serbian). Belgrade: Hipnos.
- Trbić, Vasilije (1996). Memoari: 1898-1912 (in Serbian). Kultura.
- Narodna enciklopedija Srpsko-hrvatsko-slovenačka, br. 1, 607.
