= Emilio Milutinović =

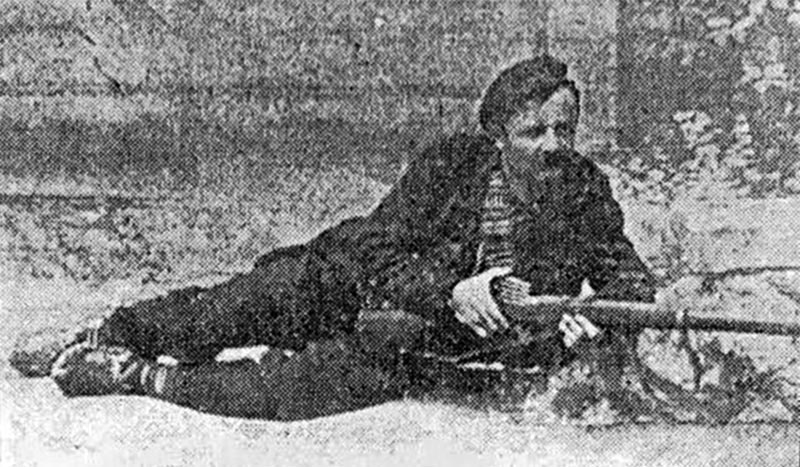
Emilio Milutinović in the early 20th century.

Emilio Milutinović (Serbian: Емилио Милутиновић; 1870 – after 1919) was a Chetnik voivode in Old Serbia during the struggle for Macedonia. As a subject of Austria-Hungary at the turn of the twentieth century, he was called to serve in the army but later his conscience would not allow him to continue because it went against his patriotic feelings as a Serb. He deserted and fled to Serbia where he entered the Serbian army with the rank of sergeant. From the year 1904, he was a Chetnik in the company of Đorđe Ristić-Skopljance, Vanđel Skopljanče, Rista Starački, and Vojislav Tankosić. Because he had a military education and Chetnik experience at the end of 1905, he was appointed voivode by the Serbian Chetnik Organization to head their staff headquarters in Skopska Crna Gora. Vasilije Trbić was given the task to take Emilio Milutinović to his post in Skopska Crna Gora. But they never reached their destination. On 21 January 1906 (Julian Calendar), Vasilije Trbić came close to losing his entire četa of 22 men when a Turkish force together with Albanians from surrounding areas ambushed them at Čelopek (not to be confused with the Fight on Čelopek, the previous year, 1905). Emilio Milutinović, who survived the slaughter with Trbič and a couple of his men, was so grieved that he resigned from further guerrilla action. Later, however, he went on to participate in both Balkan Wars and the Great War as a Chetnik volunteer.

== See also ==
- List of Chetnik voivodes
- Alimpije Marjanovic
- Velimir Karić
