= Borko Paštrović =

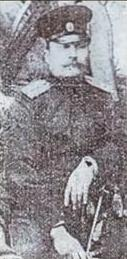
- Born: 12 April 1875; Kragujevac, Principality of Serbia (modern Serbia)
- Died: 18 December 1912 (aged 37); Lezhë, Ottoman Empire (now Albania)
- Military career
- Allegiance: Serbian Chetnik Organization (1903–08); (Kingdom of Serbia) Serbian Army (1912)
- Service years: 1904–12
- Rank: lieutenant
- Conflicts: Macedonian Struggle, First Balkan War

Borko Paštrović (Serbian: Борко Паштровић; April 12, 1875—December 18, 1912) was a Serbian Chetnik commander and later a major of artillery in the Serbian Army during the First Balkan War.

== Early life ==
Borislav Paštrović (Борислав Паштровић) was born in Kragujevac, Principality of Serbia (now Serbia) on 12 April 1875. His paternal family originated from the Novaković family from the Paštrović tribe, hence his surname. After finishing six years of gymnasium in Kruševac, he attended the Military Academy in Belgrade (25th Class). He attained the rank of lieutenant (poručnik) in 1900. Paštrović served as the commander (komandir) of a battery part of the 4th Artillery Regiment "Tanasko Rajić" headquartered in Kragujevac. By 1905, he was ranked "artillery captain of the 1st Class".

== Chetnik in Macedonia ==
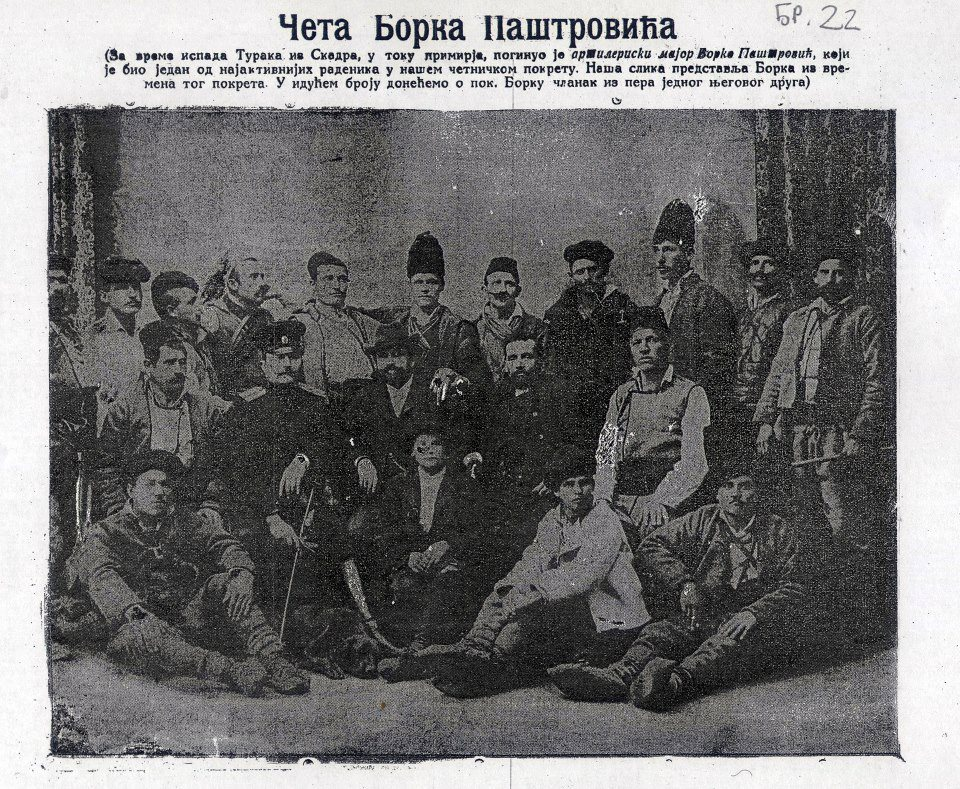
Cheta.

Paštrović joined the Serbian Chetnik Organization, an anti-Ottoman guerrilla organization, in 1904, after being recruited by Voja Tankosić. He crossed the Serbian–Ottoman border with officers such as Vojin Popović, Bogdan Hajnc, Voja Tankosić, university students such as Ljuba Jezdić, Ljuba Čupa, Miomir Milenović, Jovan Tanović, Ilija Šumenković, Milan Gavrilović, and gymnasium students such as Dragiša Stojadinović. At the beginning of 1905, he was put in charge of the Kragujevac band ("cheta"), that was formed in Kragujevac. The Chetnik bands were tasked with protecting Serb communities in "Old Serbia" from Ottoman and Bulgarian oppression. On 16 April 1905 the combined Chetnik bands defeated Ottoman troops (accompanied by Muslim Albanians) at the Battle of Čelopek.

== First Balkan War ==
In the First Balkan War, Paštrović was ranked major. He belonged to the Drina II Division, and commanded an artillery detachment (brdski divizijon). In Lezhë, on the Adriatic, his unit clashed with Essad Pasha who tried to withdraw from Shkodër after a long siege.

On 2 December 1912, was ordered (or volunteered) to lead a battalion with two mountainous quick-firing guns (a detachment) to take the village of Dajç and prevent the Ottoman garrison of Scutari to steal from the neighbouring Catholic Albanian villages. His unit was made up of 2nd Call men from Mačva. The battalion set out from Lezhë on 3 December. The detachment was welcomed with food in the Catholic villages. A heavy fight broke out on 4th and 5th December 1912, with an artillery duel, with many Serbian casualties. The opposite Ottoman right wing surrendered. During the earlier duel, Paštrović was hit by shrapnel, cutting through the lungs with skeletal damage. After energetically receiving reports and giving instructions, he fell to the ground, after he was taken on a stretcher to a house. He was said to have fallen heroically, and was buried in the porta of a Catholic church by the Drim river. The fight ended with a reported 800 dead and wounded Ottomans and 100 dead and 144 wounded Serbian soldiers. The date of death has been given as the feast day of St. Nicholas, or 18 December 1912.

== Legacy ==
A magazine piece of Branik reported on his death and called him Soko Borko ("Borko the Falcon"). A street in Kragujevac was named after him in the Interwar period.

A poem was dedicated to him (Запјевка виле Паштровке).

== Sources ==
- Krakov, Stanislav (1990) [1930]. Plamen četništva. Belgrade: Hipnos.
- „Борко Паштровић“. Народна енциклопедија. 1927.
- Bibliografski vjesnik. Vol. 20. Obod. 1991. pp. 27, 161, 188.
- Tomić, Jaša (1913). Rat u Maćedoniji i Staroj Srbiji: 1913. godine. Električna štamparija. p. 72.
- Rajić, Milan L. (1930). Život i rad. Vol. 3.
- Trbić, Vasilije (1996). Memoari: kazivanja i doživljaji vojvode veleškog. Kultura. ISBN 978-86-7801-013-2.
- Обрадовић, Александар Д. (1977). Историја ратова Краљевине Србије (1912-1918). Св. Сава. p. 196.
- Šijački, Dušan M. (10 February 1913). "Наши Јунаци". Балкански рат у слици и речи (4). Штампарија Савића и Комп.: 63.
- Šijački, Dušan M. (14 July 1913). "Од Ваљева до Јадрана". Балкански рат у слици и речи (23). Штампарија Савића и Комп.: 362–364.
