= Battle of Čelopek =

1905 battle of the Macedonian Struggle

- Part of the Macedonian Struggle
Date	29 April [O.S. 16 April] 1905
Location	Čelopek, Ottoman Empire (modern-day Staro Nagoričane, North Macedonia) 42.226944°N 21.826389°E
Result	Serbian Chetnik victory

Belligerents
Serbian Chetnik Organization	(Ottoman Empire) Ottoman Army force

Commanders and leaders
Savatije Milošević	N/A

Units involved
Savatije's Band; Čiča-Pavle's Band; Belgrade Band; Kragujevac Band	Kumanovo garrison (cavalry, infantry), Albanian irregulars (bashi-bazouks)

Strength
c. 100–120	Much larger

Casualties and losses
2–4 killed, several wounded, 8 captured	200+ killed or wounded
- Location of Čelopek in North Macedonia

The Battle of Čelopek (Serbian: Борба на Челопеку/Borba na Čelopeku) was fought at the Čelopek plateau, near Kozjak, between the Serbian Chetnik Organization and Ottoman officers accompanied by Ottoman Albanian bashi-bozuks, on 16 April 1905.

== Background ==
After the fight in Tabanovce, Savatije Milošević decided to become a vojvoda (commander), leaving the organisational works, and two other organizers, Lazar Kujundžić and Aksentije Bacetović-Baceta, also decided to do the same. Baceta was to replace the Chief of the Mountainous Staff, Ilija Jovanović. On 31 March [O.S. 18 March] the Vranje Board (Vranjski odbor) was ordered to ready Savatije for crossing the border, as "the Bulgarians are threatening and preparing". Savatije Milošević and Antonije Todorović discussed on how to ready the Mountainous Staff (a cheta) for operation in Poreč; Savatije wanted it to be formed and equipped in Vranje, and travel armed, while Antonije suggested they go one by one, unarmed, to be equipped when gathered there. Baceta and Savatije had by mid-April 1905 escorted 107 guerrillas to the Serbian–Ottoman border.

On the morning of Great Friday, 28 April [O.S. 15 April] 1905, the Belgrade and Kragujevac bands arrived at Dlabočica (Dubočica), welcomed by lieutenant (poručnik) Ilija Jovanović, who led a band on the Kozjak. Other bands present were those of Lazar Kujundžić, Čiča-Pavle Mladenović and Ljubomir Jezdić. The Kragujevac band (Kragujevačka četa) was led by captain (kapetan) Borko Paštrović, and included sub-lieutenants (potporučnici) Vojin Popović-Vuk, Dušan Jezdić, Petar Todorović and Dušan Putniković. The Belgrade band (Beogradska četa) was commanded by Baceta, and included Savatije Milošević, and lieutenants Janićije Mićić, Bogdan Hajnc, Vojislav Tankosić; sub-lieutenant Brana Jovanović; non-commissioned officers (podoficiri) Jović, Novica Leovac, Radoš Vasiljević, Trajko, and Radivoje Ilić. The bands of Stevan Nedić and Doksim Mihailović had joined the Belgrade band in Vranje, bound to return to western Povardarje after vacationing in Belgrade. The Belgrade band also included four students Milan Gavrilović, Ilija Šumenković, Dušan Dimitrijević and Miomir Milenović. Also present were intellectuals Rade Luković and Dragiša Stojadinović. There were c. 170 guerrillas.

Baceta reorganized the bands somewhat. Đorđe Ristić-Skopljanče was given the command of a band that included the officers Hajnc, Brana and Putniković, accompanied by the Mountainous Staff of Baceta, with Ilija Jovanović, Mićić, Vuk, bringing the total of this group to 38 men, which arrived at Pelince before dawn (03:00) of Great Saturday (29 April [O.S. 16 April]).

The larger group of Chetniks, some 130, were escorted by Čiča-Pavle to Nikuljane below the Čelopek height, at dawn on the same day. Čiča-Pavle took his own band and set out to Eastern Povardarje, while the rest of that group readied to cross Skopska Crna Gora into Poreč.

== History ==
On the Great Saturday (29 April [O.S. 16 April]) on the eve of Easter, the Chetnik supreme commander (vojvoda) Savatije Milošević, who led a band of 40 fighters, saw from the Nikuljane height overlooking Kumanovo, that a large Ottoman unit appeared. An Ottoman army tracking unit detected the Chetniks at Nikuljane. Savatije sent four men ahead to take the Čelopek height. The Čelopek height was a good defensive position owing to its rocks. The Ottoman unit, made up of cavalrymen numbering c. 200, saw the four guerrillas running and thus decided to encircle the village, and in the meantime, the rest of Savatije's Chetniks moved to carefully cross the valley in order to arrive at Čelopek. Ottoman infantry also arrived, and fired shots, which gathered local Muslim Albanians ("Arnauts"), bashi-bazouks. The Ottoman soldiers were led by reformed officers.

The Chetniks that had arrived at the Čelopek height stayed put, and did not fire yet, until Ottoman soldiers and Albanians came near and they all fired at once, resulting in panic. The Belgrade students, led by Tankosić, were fatigued, cut by the steep and sharp rocks, and lost morale, but Tankosić and Dimitrijević, the most fit of the students, covered their backs with precise shots, together with the hail of bullets from the Chetniks at Čelopek, and thereby stopped enemy encroachment on this group. Gavrilović was wounded in the leg, but managed to the top. Albanians from Algunja, Mutlovo and Suševo also arrived. Petar Todorović-Divostinac and sergeant (narednik) Radul Kosovac-Lipjanac fell, with Kosovac being hit in the temple while covering behind a rock. A group of Albanians noticed Kosovac's body, and hurried up the height to loot him and his rapid-fire gun (brzometka); 14 of these were killed, while one Albanian from Mutlovo, Iljaz, managed and ran down the height, but was nevertheless hit and wounded in the feet. On the other side of the height, the Chetnik commander Čiča-Pavle arrived with c. 40 guerrillas that engaged and threw bombs, which diffused the Ottoman ranks. However, the enemy were still larger in numbers and encircled the Chetniks at Čelopek.

At three in the afternoon, before the evening, Skopljanče arrived from Pelince with his band and the Mountainous Staff, in the rear of the Ottoman troops and Albanians. The Chetniks now assaulted with platoon fire and bombs. The number of Chetniks that fought at Čelopek were c. 100–120. The Ottomans and Albanians were surprised by the fire from the rear, and dispersed. When night fell, the Ottoman troops stopped attacking, as they feared that peasants would attack them from behind. The battle is described as bloody, many Ottoman soldiers and Albanians fell, with at least 200 dead and wounded. For two days, dead and wounded were carried from the height. Especially Đorđe Skopljanče and Popović-Vuk distinguished themselves. The Chetnik casualties are undetermined, being reportedly only two dead, Petar Todorović-Divostinac and Radul Kosovac-Lipjanac, with only one wounded; three dead and three wounded; those two and "others"; or, according to British Vice-Consul Wilfred Gilbert Thesiger's report dated 19 April (O.S.) that fighting near Kumanovo "the earlier day" had taken four Serbian officers' lives, and 8 captured.

== Aftermath and legacy ==
News of the fight quickly spread to the neighbouring villages, and Kumanovo. The Albanians admired their feat and feared them, while Serbs took price and rejoiced. The victory enraged the Ottomans, who began a manhunt for the rebels. The Chetniks bound for Poreč (including Savatije and Kujundžić's elite band) returned to Serbia, while the Mountainous Staff, Čiča-Pavle's and Skopljanče's bands stayed in the terrain.

On 30 April [O.S. 17 April], Kosta Pećanac's band of 35 clashed with an Ottoman unit with artillery at Vuksan/Crna Stena; four Chetniks died while 40 Ottomans were dead and wounded.

On 21 January 1906, another fight took place at Čelopek, where Vasilije Trbić nearly lost his whole band (22 men).

On 26 December 1928, the Kumanovo municipality petitioned for a monument to be erected in honour of the fallen Chetniks of Čelopek in both battles (1905, 1906).

== Annotations ==
1. It is known in Serbian as Borba na Čelopeku (Борба на Челопеку), Čelopečka bitka (Челопечка битка).
