= Čiča-Pavle =

Serbian Chetnik commander

Pavle Mladenović
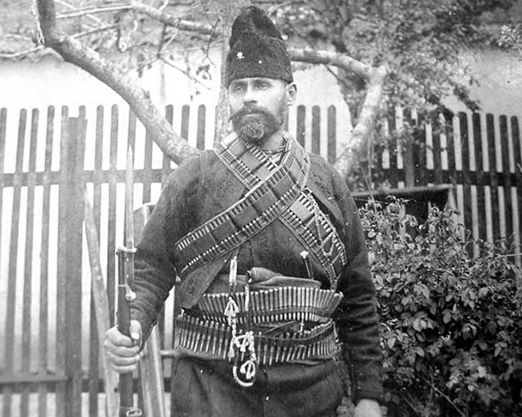
- Čiča-Pavle in Chetnik gear
- Born: Jačince, Ottoman Empire (now Norrh Macedonia)
- Died: Beljakovac, Ottoman Empire (now North Macedonia)
- Military career
- Allegiance: Serbian Chetnik Organization (1903–1905)
- Service years: 1903–05
- Rank: Voivode (Vojvoda)
- Nickname: Čiča-Pavle
- Conflicts: Macedonian Struggle; Battle of Čelopek

Pavle Mladenović (Serbian Cyrillic: Павле Младеновић; d. June 16, 1905), known as Čiča-Pavle (Чича Павле; "Uncle Pavle") and Pavle Jačinski, was a Serbian Chetnik commander active in Macedonia during the Macedonian Struggle.

== Life ==
Mladenović was born in the village of Jačince, in the region of Ovče Polje, at the time part of the Ottoman Empire. He worked as a peasant in his village and became an Exarchist at the end of the 19th century. When the Internal Macedonian Revolutionary Organization (IMRO) started assassinating and murdering people who identified as Serbs in the Kumanovo region, Čiča Pavle took his sons and nephews to the woods and joined the precursor to the Serbian Chetnik Organization. He started guerilla fighting in springtime 1903, as the first Serbian vojvoda, a year before the establishment of the Serbian Committee. His band had strict orders of protection, and it fought until 1905 without major clashes, defending Serb villages from Bulgarian nationalist bands of the IMRO. In April 1905 he participated in the Battle of Čelopek alongside commanders Doksim Mihailović, Savatije Milošević, Lazar Kujundžić, Vojislav Tankosić, Aksentije Bacetović and Borko Paštrović. During the battle, he took the Čelopek height and thus prevented the encirclement of the Serbian bands from the Albanian bashi-bozuks. Shortly thereafter, he and Bacetović were surrounded by the Ottoman army near the village of Beljakovac. Čiča Pavle, Bacetović, and everyone in their bands was killed.

After his death, his son Jaćim Pavlović-Jaćko continued in his father's footsteps, becoming a Serbian voivode himself.

== See also ==
- List of Chetnik voivodes
