= Tankosić =

Tankosić may refer to:

- Tankosić, Kosovo, a village near Ferizaj
- Miroslav Tankosić (born 1978), Serbian football player
- Ratko Tankosić (born 1954), Serbian actor
- Vojislav Tankosić (1880–1915), Serbian major and member of the Black Hand
