= Ilija Jovanović-Pčinjski =

Chetnik commander (1878–1913)

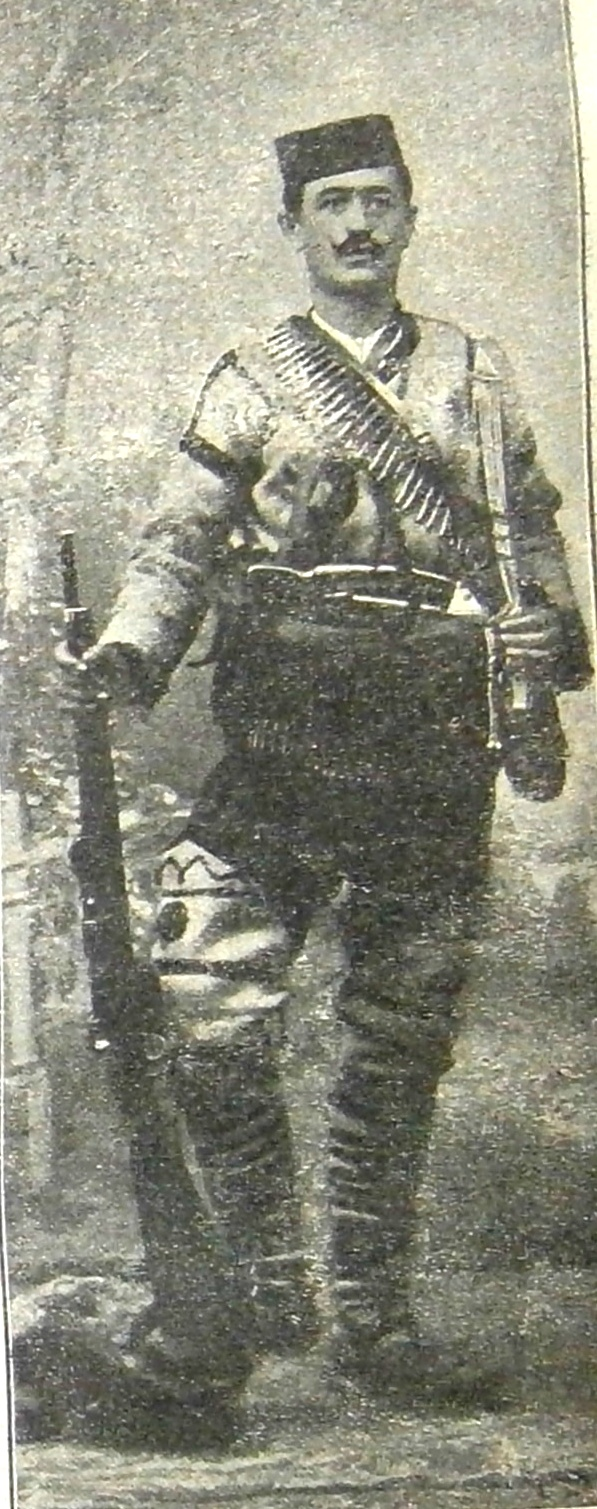
- Born: August 2, 1878; Preobraženje, Principality of Serbia
- Died: 1913 (35 years); Belgrade, Kingdom of Serbia
- Military career
- Allegiance: (Kingdom of Serbia) Serbian Army (1903–12); Serbian Chetnik Organization (1903–08)
- Service years: 1903–12
- Nicknames: Vojvoda Pčinjski; Časlav
- Conflicts: Serbian operation in Macedonia, First Balkan War

Ilija Jovanović (Serbian Cyrillic: Илија Јовановић, 1878–1913), known as Vojvoda Pčinjski, and by his nom de guerre Časlav, was a Chetnik commander active between 1904 and 1912, and a member of the Black Hand. He was schooled in Vranje, Paraćin, Kragujevac. He was among the first Chetniks on the Kozjak together with commanders Jovan Dovezenski, Krsta Preševski, Spasa Garda, Đorđe Skopljanče, Rista Starački and Vanđel Skopljanče. Vojvoda Pčinjski was the chief of one of the board of the Chetnik organization. He went from a battle to another until he was wounded in 1912. He died in the Belgrade Military Hospital, at the time when the Serbian Army liberated Bitola and broke out on the Adriatic.

== See also ==
- List of Chetnik voivodes
