= Kokošinje murders =

- Native name: покољ Срба у селу Кокошињу
- Date: August 6, 1904
- Location: Kokošinje, Ottoman Empire (now North Macedonia)
- Organised by: IMRO
- Participants: IMRO band of Atanas Babata
- Deaths: Up to 60 Serbs murdered

On August 6, 1904, there were murders in Kokošinje of Serbs carried out by the IMRO Bulgarian bands of Atanas Babata. Parts of the IMRO, which supported the Bulgarian Exarchate, executed notable Serbs, who supported the Patriarchate of Constantinople.

== Background ==
Per Serbian sources the IMRO plotted against the Serbian Chetniks. Per Bulgarian sources on July 11, 1904, the chetas of Atanas Babata, Slaveyko Arsov and Stoyan Donski were surrounded by a large Turkish troops near the village of Gorno Gjugjantsi. After a six-hour battle in which the Turks used artillery and cavalry, the Bulgarian Chetniks managed to break through the cordon and escaped, but 20 people were killed, including the vojvode Donski, and the wounded vojvode Arsov committed suicide. Subsequently, Atanas Babata received information that the chetas were found after a betrayal by [sic] Serbomans from the village in the area called Kokošinje and he decided to exact revenge.

In the meantime, there was still hope that the Serbs and Bulgarians would work together in Macedonia; however, in Macedonian villages, the massacres began.

== Massacre ==
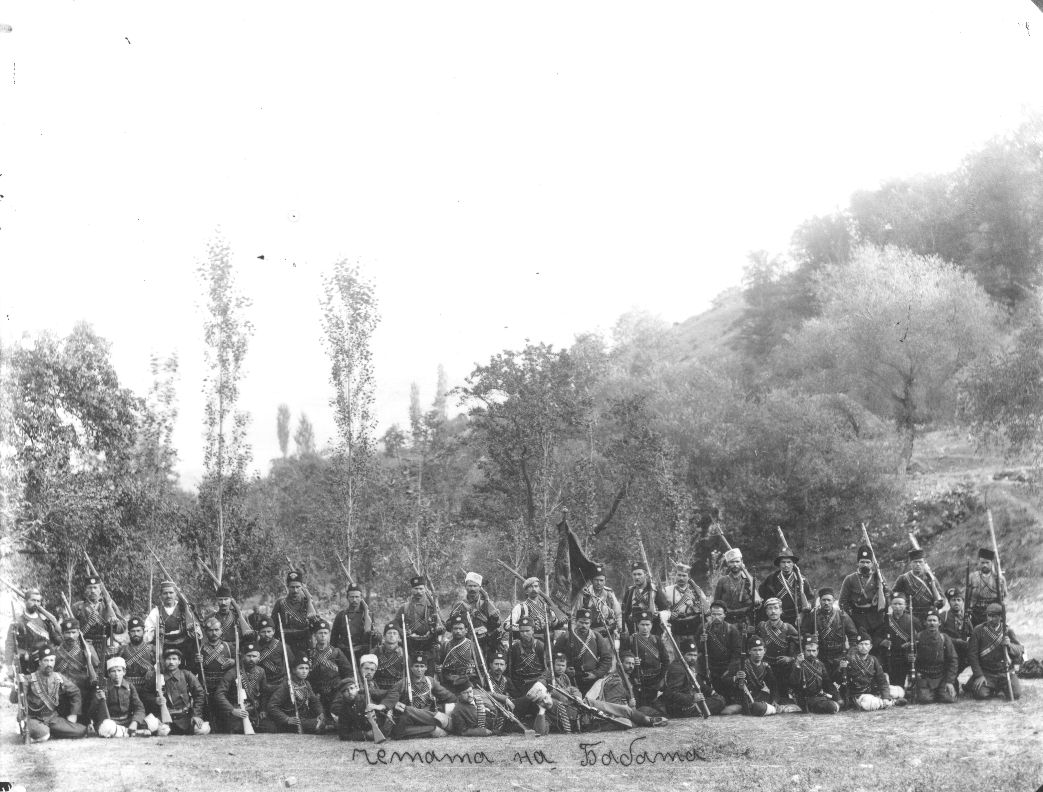
Band of Atanas Babata, 1906.

On the night of August 6, Bulgarian vojvode Atanas Babata and his band entered the Serbian village of Kokošinje, where they were searching for people that were condemned to death by the Bulgarian Committee. Prota Aleksić stayed in his house, with Jovan Cvetković, the new village teacher from Kumanovo, and his nephew Milan Pop-Petrušinović. Babata entered the house, and Prota Aleksić's servant Mihajlo Miladinović hid on the attic, listening to the shouting and hearing that daskal Jovan Dovezenski had gathered a band in Serbia. The three were taken out by the road, tied with kmet Trajko Car, starešina (elder) Mita Pržo, and the elder's son Grozdan, and grandchild Gavo, and youngster Jovan Ivanović-Čekerenda. Babata's soldiers awaited his further commands, he turned to the teacher: "Come on, tell me that you are Bulgarian, and you can continue be a Serb, and I will spare your life", but he refused. Babata put his bayonnet to the breast of Cvetković, and to his astonishment, the teacher jumped on it with all his weight. The killing began, and 8, 9, or 11 people were killed. Babata then searched in the school, and on the second floor they found an old man, teacher Dane Stojanović, who also had been condemned to death by the Bulgarian Committee. After Babata and his band had disappeared, the houses opened and the women screeched, and the silent villagers moved the bodies. Servant Miladinović immediately left the village and began his search of Dovezenski. The next day, Babata and his whole band returned, and he held feral speeches in the inn by the school, in front of all villagers, as Dane Stojanović, too, had refused renouncing his Serbian identity.

== Aftermath ==
On this same day, 7 August, Dovezenski had crossed the border. Dovezenski, who had been to church school in Belgrade, and had been a teacher in his village, had in a period of 7 years lost friends due to their Serb identity. When in March 1904, Bulgarians killed his godfather Atanas Stojiljković in his birthvillage of Dovezance, Dovezenski closed his school and went to Vranje, where he demanded a permit to form a Chetnik band. Servant Miladinović found the band of Jovan Pešić-Strelac, which was composed of Chetniks from Toplica, Vranje frontier soldiers, and people from Old Serbia. While descending the Pčinja, they learnt of the Kokošinje massacre, which the whole Kratovo and Kumanovo regions uttered Babata's name, but also heard the name of Jordan Spasev, a Bulgarian reserve soldier.

The affluent Serb family Dunković, originally from Berovo, which had held the resistance of the Kratovo village of Rudar against the Bulgarian Exarchate and Bulgarians, had been condemned to death by the Bulgarian Committee. In the dawn of August 11, Jordan Spasev and his 30 komiti surrounded the vakuf mill of the Vakov-Nenovce village. They tortured and killed the villagers.

On the same day as Trbić arrived at Mramorac, 14 August, the Bulgarians had killed Serbian priest Stavro Krstić, whose priest father Stojan had earlier been killed by Bulgarians. The Bulgarians had found out that he would bless the house of his godfather in Podgorac on The Assumption. The godfather was out, and they waited until the godfather's wife had left the house, and then entered the house where they found the priest reading prayers. They shot him in the chest, and wounded he shut the door and went outside the house with a revolver, where he was shot a second time and died. In Mramorac the Serbian Chetniks learnt of his death from the villagers.

== Sources ==
- Krakov, Stanislav (1990) [1930]. Plamen četništva (in Serbian). Belgrade: Hipnos.
- Andrija Radenić; Danica Milić; Istorijski institut u Beogradu (1973). Österreich-Ungarn und Serbien, 1903-1918. Istorijski institut. "Blutbad von Kokosinje"
- Veljko Đ Đurić; Miličko Mijović (1993). Ilustrovana istorija četničkog pokreta. Narodna knj. "Па ипак у августу и у септембру 1904. претставници Егзархије и званичне Бугарске почели су нападе на Србе; њихов је ... Највише су страдала села ђермане, Рударе, Довезенце, Кокошиње, Татомир, Турчево, Живаљево, Горње ... Застао је крај лешева својих господара и мрачан изашао је из села да потражи чету Довезенскога. Пре него што је стигла у Кокошиње заштита, још једном се појавила у селу чета Боботина. Кафеџија из Башиног села, који је ..."
