= Ljuba Čupa =

Serbian journalist (1877–1913)

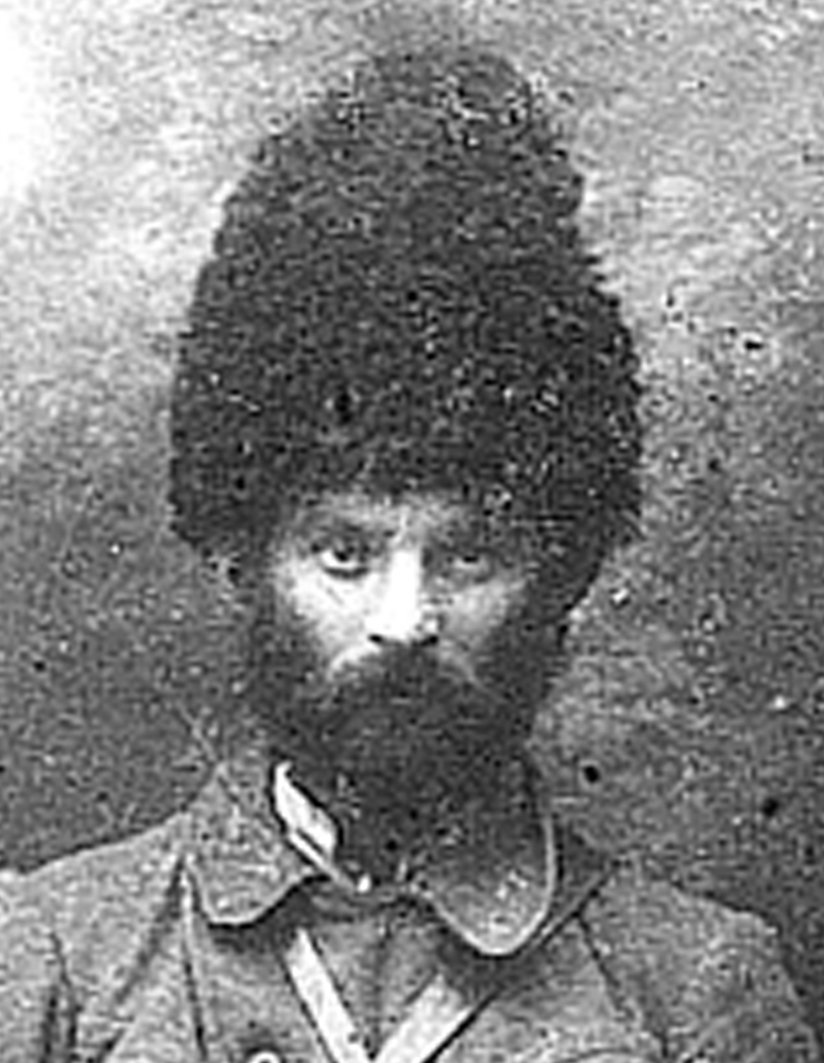
- Born: Ljubomir S. Jovanović; 1877; Brezova
- Died: 25 June 1913 (aged 36); Skopje
- Burial place: Skopje
- Military career
- Allegiance: Kingdom of Serbia
- Nickname: Čupa

Ljubomir S. Jovanović (Serbian Cyrillic: Љубомир С. Јовановић, 1877–25 June 1913), known as Ljuba Čupa (Љуба Чупа), was a Serbian guerrilla fighter, member of the Black Hand, soldier in the Balkan Wars, and journalist. He advocated for a united state of South Slavs under the leadership of Serbia.

== Life ==
He was born in Brezova, Principality of Serbia. He attended primary school in his hometown and high school in Belgrade. He was enrolled in law school but his studies were disrupted by his political interest. A Serbian nationalist, he participated in the March Demonstrations (1903) in Belgrade against King Aleksandar Obrenović, and was accused of being the leader of Greater Serbia-demonstrations and an associate of the rivaling officers; he was forced to flee by boat to Zemun, at the time part of the Austro-Hungary. He moved to Vienna, and then returned to Serbia following the May Coup.

As many nationalistic youths he was inspired by the Serbian Chetnik Organization. In February 1905 he joined the unit of Aksentije Bacetović-Baceta and operated in the Kozjak area, participating in several operations. After the death of Baceta in 1905, he returned to Belgrade where he finished his law studies. At this time he began working in journalism. He spent some time in Brussels. As a student, he was a founder and editor of the Slovenski jug magazine, and when he was unable to pay the rent for his apartment he slept in the office. In 1911, Ljuba Jovanović with two colleagues, Branko Božović and Bogdan Radenković, started a daily called Pijemont that had among its contributors well-known critics, poets, and writers, including Jovan Skerlić Milutin Bojić, Milan Rakić, Jovan Dučić, and others. Apart from tirelessly campaigning for pan-Serb unification, Pijemont offered a variety of political ideas, targeting corruption and discord in Serbia.

Ljuba was one of initiators of the establishment of the Black Hand (1911), and one of the founding members. Together with Bogdan Radenković and Vojislav Tankosić he wrote the constitution of the organization. The constitution was modeled after similar German secret nationalist associations and the Italian Carbonari. He founded the Pijemont magazine in August 1911.

He was mobilized in the First Balkan War and fought as a reserve officer. He participated in the Second Balkan War against Bulgaria in the summer of 1913 and was wounded in the knee in fighting around Veles. He was transported for treatment in Skopje, but the hospital was infected with cholera, from which he died on 25 June 1913. He was buried in Skopje, but the location of his remains is unknown.

== See also ==
- List of Chetnik voivodes
