= Aksentije Bacetić =

Baceta
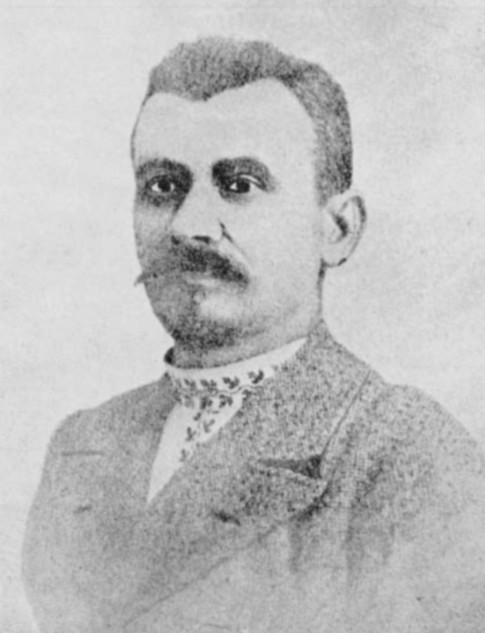
- Born: Aksentije Bacetić; 27 February 1860; Užice, Principality of Serbia
- Died: 16 June 1905 (aged 45); Beljakovce, Ottoman Empire
- Military career
- Allegiance: Serbian Chetnik Organization (1904–05)
- Service years: 1904–05
- Rank: vojvoda (Commander); šef Gorskog štaba (Chief of Mountainous Headquarters)
- Nicknames: Baceta, Rujanac

Aksentije Bacetić (Serbian Cyrillic: Аксентије Бацетић, 27 February 1860 – 16 June 1905), known as Rujanac (Рујанац) and Baceta (Бацета), was a Serbian secret agent and Chetnik commander in Macedonia.

== Early life ==
Bacetić or Bacetović (Бацетовић) was born in the village of Kriva Reka near Užice, in the Principality of Serbia. He had red hair. As a youngster he joined the ranks of the People's Radical Party. He participated in the Timok Rebellion in 1882, after which he fled to the Principality of Bulgaria. He then went to the Russian Empire where he enrolled in the NCO school finished with the rank of junker. He returned to Serbia where his sub-commander rank was recognized.

He translated works from Bulgarian into Serbian.

== Secret agent ==
Bacetić worked as a double agent in Bulgaria, giving the Serbian command information on Bulgarian troop placements during the Serbo-Bulgarian War (1885). He was caught and sentenced to death, but the Serbian side insisted on prison during the peace treaty talks, and he was given 101 years of imprisonment. He managed to escape from prison and returned to Serbia, and was then sent to carry out espionage in Austria-Hungary. He was accused of being a Bulgarian spy and was expelled from service. After the May Coup (1903), he started to work with old crafts in Old Serbia and Macedonia.

== Serbian Chetnik Organization ==
Bacetić subsequently built relations with and joined the Serbian Chetnik Organization, becoming one of the board members, organizing operations in Macedonia. He "fanatically" led the Chetnik movement.

After the fight in Tabanovce (March 27, 1905), Savatije Milošević, Lazar Kujundžić and Baceta left their offices as organizers of the action, wanting to feel the Chetnik lifestyle "from within" as voivodes. Baceta was to replace the then Chief of Upper Staff, Ilija Jovanović. Baceta and Savatije, by mid-April, had moved 107 fighters across the border. The Chetniks defeated a local Ottoman army contingent at the Fight on Čelopek (April 16, 1905). The victory enraged the Ottomans, who began manhunting the rebels. The rebels were forced to retreat across the border, and were dispersed. Čiča Pavle and Bacetović were surrounded by the Ottoman army near the village of Beljakovce on 16 June, and all in their bands were killed.

Military offices
First	Chief of the Mountainous Headquarters on the left side of the Vardar ?–June 1905	Succeeded by ?

== Annotations ==
- His surname has also been spelled "Bacetović".

== See also ==
- List of Chetnik voivodes

== Sources ==
- Đurić, Veljko Đ.; Mijović, Miličko (1993). Ilustrovana istorija četničkog pokreta (in Serbian).
- Jerinić, D. S. (2008). "Војводе из четничке акције у Старој Србији и Маћедонији 1903-1912". Добровољачки гласник, бр. 32. година 17. Удружење ратних добровољаца 1912-1918: 29–30.
- Jovanović, Aleksa (1937). Spomenica dvadesetogodišnjice oslobodjenja Južne Srbije, 1912-1937 (in Serbian). Južna Srbija.
- Krakov, Stanislav (1990) [1930]. Plamen četništva (in Serbian). Belgrade: Hipnos. pp. 216–222.
- Ilić, Vladimir (2006). Српска четничка акција 1903-1912 (in Serbian). Belgrade: Ecolibri. ISBN 978-86-7905-044-1.
- Trifunović, Ilija (1933). Trnotivim stazama (in Serbian). Belgrade.
