= Vanđel Skopljanče =

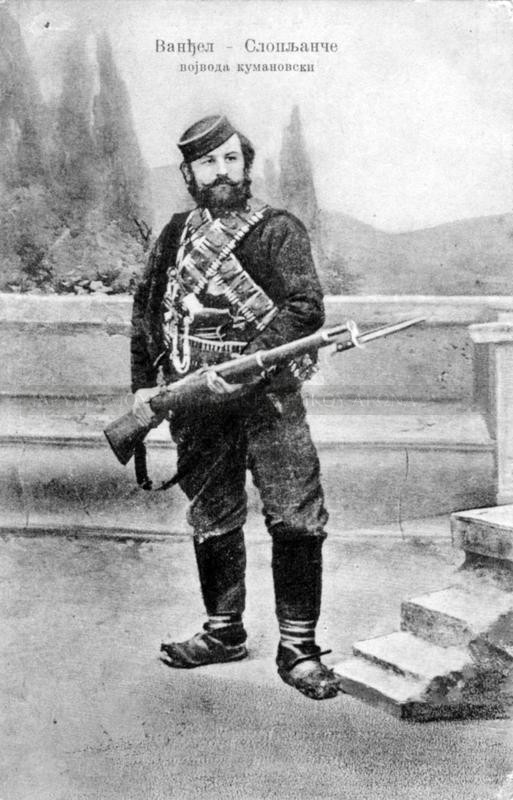
Vojvoda Vanđel Skopljanče

Vanđel Dimitrijević Skopljanče (1875–1915) was a participant in the struggle for Macedonia during the early 20th century.

== Biography ==
He was born in Skopje in 1875. Initially he was a comitadji of the pro-Bulgarian IMRO and in 1903 participated in the Ilinden Uprising. After the founding of the Serbian Chetnik organization in 1903, he joined as Vojvoda and organized a company (ćeta). He was active in Kumanovo and Preševo region from 1903 to 1905. After 1905, he was withdrawn from the field along with six others (Rista Starački, Jovan Dovezenski, Vladimir Kovačević, Trenko Rujanović, Emilio Milutinović and Jovan Pešić) and stripped of his rank for insubordination by the Serbian Chetnik Organization. In the First Balkan War, he was again deployed in Chetnik detachments, participating in all 1912 battles led by Vojvoda Vuk, and the Volunteer Detachment in the Second Balkan War of 1913. In the First World War, he fought in Chetnik detachments from the beginning of the conflict (1914). He was killed by the invading Bulgarian troops in Bitola in late 1915, defending the Serbian Army's retreat over the Albanian mountains.

== See also ==
- List of Chetnik voivodes
