= Ruklada =

- Village (Selo)
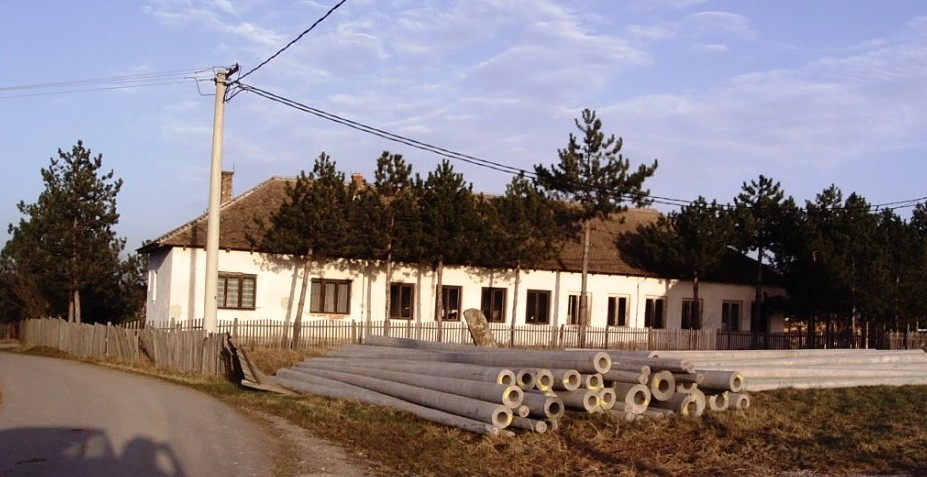
- School in Ruklada

- Location within Serbia
- Coordinates: 44°24′N 20°06′E
- Country: Serbia
- District: Kolubara District
- Municipality: Ub

Area
  - Total: 8.84 km^{2} (3.41 sq mi)
- Elevation: 144 m (472 ft)

Population (2011)
  - Total: 317
  - Density: 35.9/km^{2} (92.9/sq mi)
- Time zone: UTC+1 (CET)
  - Summer (DST): UTC+2 (CEST)

Ruklada is a village in the municipality of Ub, Serbia. According to the 2011 census, the village has a population of 317 people. It is the birthplace of Vojislav Tankosić, who participated in the May Coup and was accused of involvement in the assassination of Archduke Franz Ferdinand.
