= Dubočica =

Dubočica may refer to:

- Dubočica (region), in southern Serbia
- Dubočica, Leskovac, city neighbourhood
- Dubočica (Višegrad), a village in Bosnia and Herzegovina
