= Janićije Mićić =

Serbian Soldier

Janićije Mićić (Rožanstvo, Serbia, 13 August 1874 – Belgrade, Yugoslavia, 17 April 1949) was a highly decorated Serbian career soldier, a participant of the Balkan Wars and the Great War. He was a bearer of two Order of Karađorđe's Star with Swords.

== Biography ==
He was born on August 13, 1874, in Rožanstvo, municipality of Čajetina, in the family of caterers Paun and Jelica Mićić. He attended elementary school in Prokuplje and high school in Belgrade and Nis. He completed the Military Academy (Serbia) and the Serbian infantry NCO in 1892 in Belgrade and immediately got the rank of sergeant.

As an active officer in the period from February 1900 to July 1906, in the rank of the guide and adjutant, he was serving in the XII regiment of Karađorđe, then in the XIX regiment headquarters in Kragujevac and the IX of the Braničevska county district command. At that time he participated in Chetnik actions in Kumanovo and Kriva Palanka. He was assigned to the Mountain Headquarters and participated in the Fight on Čelopek as an officer leading a Cheta. The Fight on Čelopek (Serbian: Borba na Čelopeku/Борба на Челопеку) or Battle on Čelopek (Bitka/Битка) was fought at the Čelopek plateau near Kozjak between the Serbian Chetniks and Ottoman officers accompanied by Ottoman Albanian bashi-bozuks, on April 16, 1905.

In the spring of 1906 in Kragujevac he participated in the clandestine preparation of a coup d'état against the regime at that time, because of his dissatisfaction with his status in relation to the earlier May Coup (Serbia) conspirators. The plot was to be executed on May 1, 1906, but was discovered on April 30. A large military court in Belgrade accused the conspirators of high treason and imposed severe punishments on February 9, 1907. Janićije Mićić was sentenced to six years in prison. After serving two years (in February 1909) he was released and pardoned, though banned temporarily from military service. Not until November 29, 1912, with the First Balkan War already underway, did he receive his old rank -- Second lieutenant—and was returned to his old post. Mićić fought in the Serbian Army during the Balkan Wars of 1912 and 1913 and was awarded medals for valor. He served in World War I and was involved in the Serbian Army's retreat through Albania in late 1915. He commanded troops, repeatedly wounded, through the most difficult struggle and breakthrough of the Thessaloniki front. He later received several decorations for his achievements on the Macedonian front, also known as Salonika front.

After the war, in 1920, due to merit, he was returned to active military service in the rank of lieutenant colonel, first to the adjutant department of the Ministry of the Army and Navy, and later put in charge of Serbian Army Uniforms, from where he retired.

He died on April 17, 1949, and was buried at the New Cemetery (Novo groblje) in Belgrade.

== Orders, decorations, medals ==
- Order of Karađorđe's Star, 5th Class
- Order of Karađorđe's Star, 3rd Class
- Gold Medal for Devotional Service
- Order of the White Eagle (Serbia), 5th Class
- Order of the White Eagle (Serbia), 4th Class
- Albanian Commemorative Medal
- French Legion of Honor (grade of Chevalier)

== Sources ==
- Ђенић, Милисав Р. (2014). Споменица знаменитих и заслужних Златибораца. Чајетина: Библиотека Љубиша Р. Ђенић Чајетина. p. 63. ISBN 978-86-84219-41-3.

== See also ==
- List of Chetnik voivodes
