= Dajç =

Dajç may refer to the following places in Albania:

- Dajç, Lezhë, a village in the municipality of Lezhë, Lezhë County
- Dajç, Shkodër, a village in the municipality of Shkodër, Shkodër County
