= Samoljica =

Samoljica Самољица Sumulicë
- Village
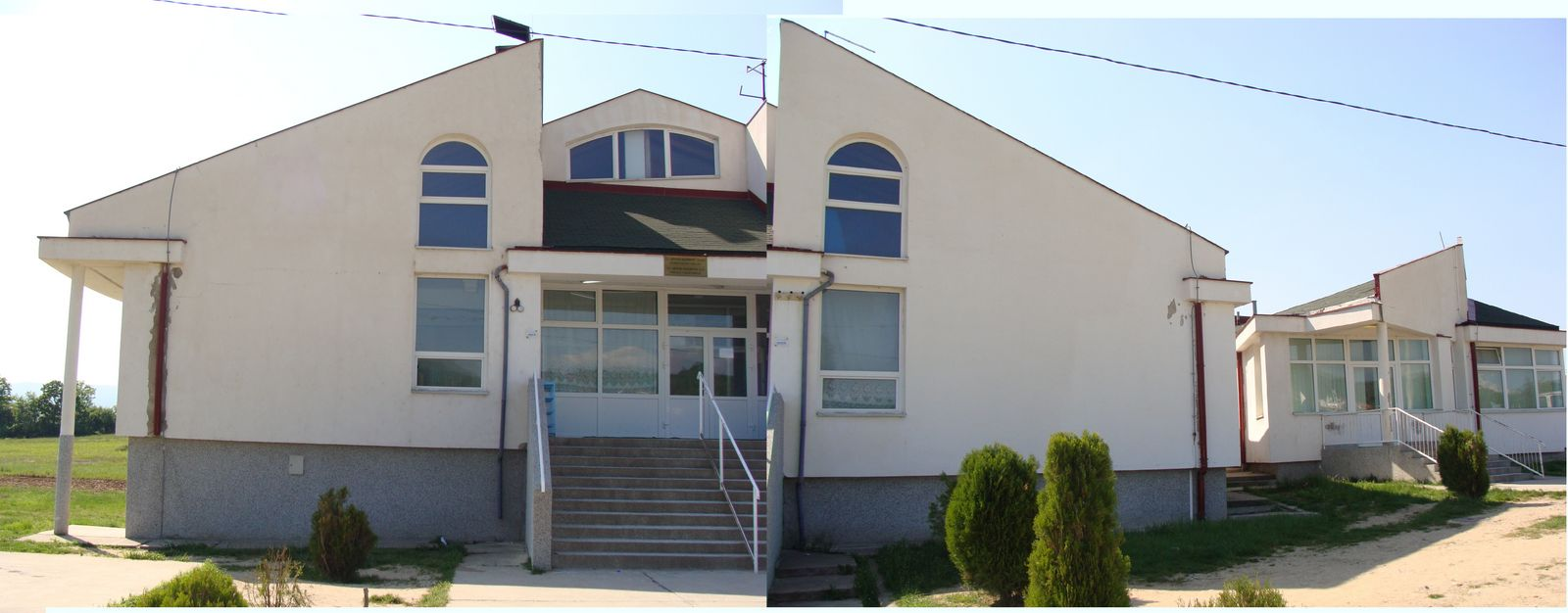
- School in Samoljica

- Location within Serbia
- Coordinates: 42°22′55″N 21°44′41″E
- Country: Serbia
- Region: Southern and Eastern Serbia
- District: Pčinja
- Municipality: Bujanovac

Population (2002)
  - Total: 1,421
- Time zone: UTC+1 (CET)
  - Summer (DST): UTC+2 (CEST)

Samoljica (Serbian Cyrillic: Самољица;Albanian: Sumulicë) is a village in the municipality of Bujanovac, Serbia. According to the 2002 census, the town has a population of 1,421. Of these, 1373 (98.09 %) were ethnic Albanians, 12 (1.34 %) were Serbs, 1 (0.11 %) Bosniak, and 4 (0.44 %) others.
