= Novačani =

Novačani Новачани
- Village
- Location within North Macedonia
- Country: North Macedonia
- Region: Vardar
- Municipality: Veles

Population (2002)
  - Total: 5
- Time zone: UTC+1 (CET)
  - Summer (DST): UTC+2 (CEST)
- Car plates: VE

Novačani is a small village located in the northern part of Veles Municipality in North Macedonia.

== Demographics ==
According to the 2002 census, the village had a total of 5 inhabitants. Ethnic groups in the village include:

- Macedonians 5
