= Krsta Kovačević =

Serbian Chetnik commander

Krsta Kovačević–Trgoviški
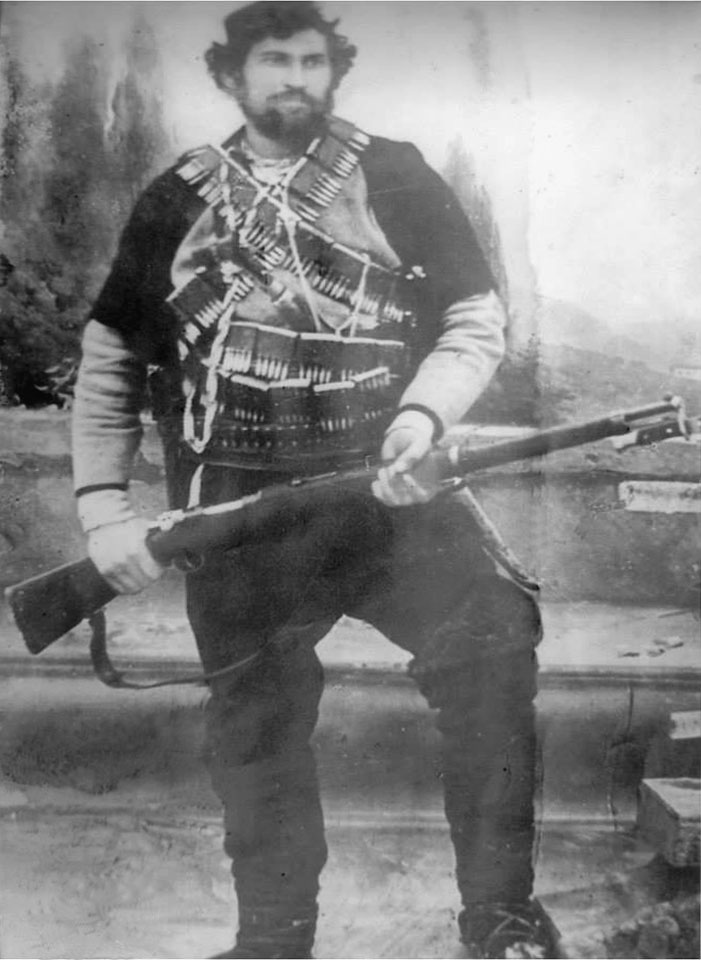
- 2 July 1910
- Born: 1877; Trgovište, Preševo kaza, Kosovo Vilayet, Ottoman Empire (now Serbia)
- Died: January 30, 1948 (aged 69); Preševo, Yugoslavia (now Serbia)
- Military career
- Allegiance: Internal Macedonian Revolutionary Organization (1903); Serbian Chetnik Organization (1904–1908); (Kingdom of Serbia) Serbian Army (1912–18)
- Service years: 1903–24
- Rank: Voivode (Vojvoda)
- Nicknames: Krsta Trgoviški, Krsta Preševski (Крста Прешевски)
- Conflicts: Macedonian Struggle; Balkan Wars; World War I

Krsta Kovačević (Serbian Cyrillic: Крста Ковачевић; 1877—January 30, 1948), known as Krsta Trgoviški (Крста Трговишки), was a Serbian Chetnik commander that was active in Old Serbia and Macedonia during the Macedonian Struggle (1903–08), then participated in the Balkan Wars (1912–13) and World War I (1914–18). In Bulgaria he is considered a Bulgarian renegade who switched sides, i.e. (sic) Serboman.

== Early life ==
Kovačević was born in the village of Trgovište in the Pčinja region, which at the time was administratively part of the Preševo kaza (administrative region) of the Kosovo Vilayet in the Ottoman Empire (now located in Serbia). He was a blacksmith in his birth village until 1900, when he murdered an Ottoman soldier who beat up his younger brother Spiro. He fled to the Principality of Bulgaria where he worked as a labourer on the railways in Sofia.

== IMRO ==
Kovačević was soon noticed by the pro-Bulgarian Internal Macedonian Revolutionary Organization (IMRO), which recruited him into the organization. He was initially part of the četa (band) of general Ivan Tsonchev, where he became best friends with Krastyo Lazarov, the later IMRO commander of Kumanovo. At the time of the Ilinden Uprising (1903) he was part of the band of IMRO commander of Skopje, Nikola Pushkarov, at which time he used his experience as a railway worker to blow up the rail near the village of Novačani. After Pushkarov's withdrawal, Kovačević joined the band of Todor Panitsa whose band after several unsuccessful skirmishes was forced to take shelter in Vranje, in the Kingdom of Serbia. There, Kovačević befriended Živojin Rafajlović, and determined to join the newly self-organized Serbian Chetnik Organization, thus he left the Bulgarian organization which had up until then had many Serbian fighters in its ranks (as there was no self-organized Serbian organization prior to 1904).

== Serbian Organization ==
In 1904, Kovačević was awarded the title of vojvoda, and he commanded several notable fighters who later became commanders themselves, such as Vojislav Tankosić and Vojin Popović-Vuk. After the Young Turk Revolution (1908), he lived a peaceful life in Preševo until 1909, when he discovered just in time that the Turks sought to murder him, which made him leave for the woods.

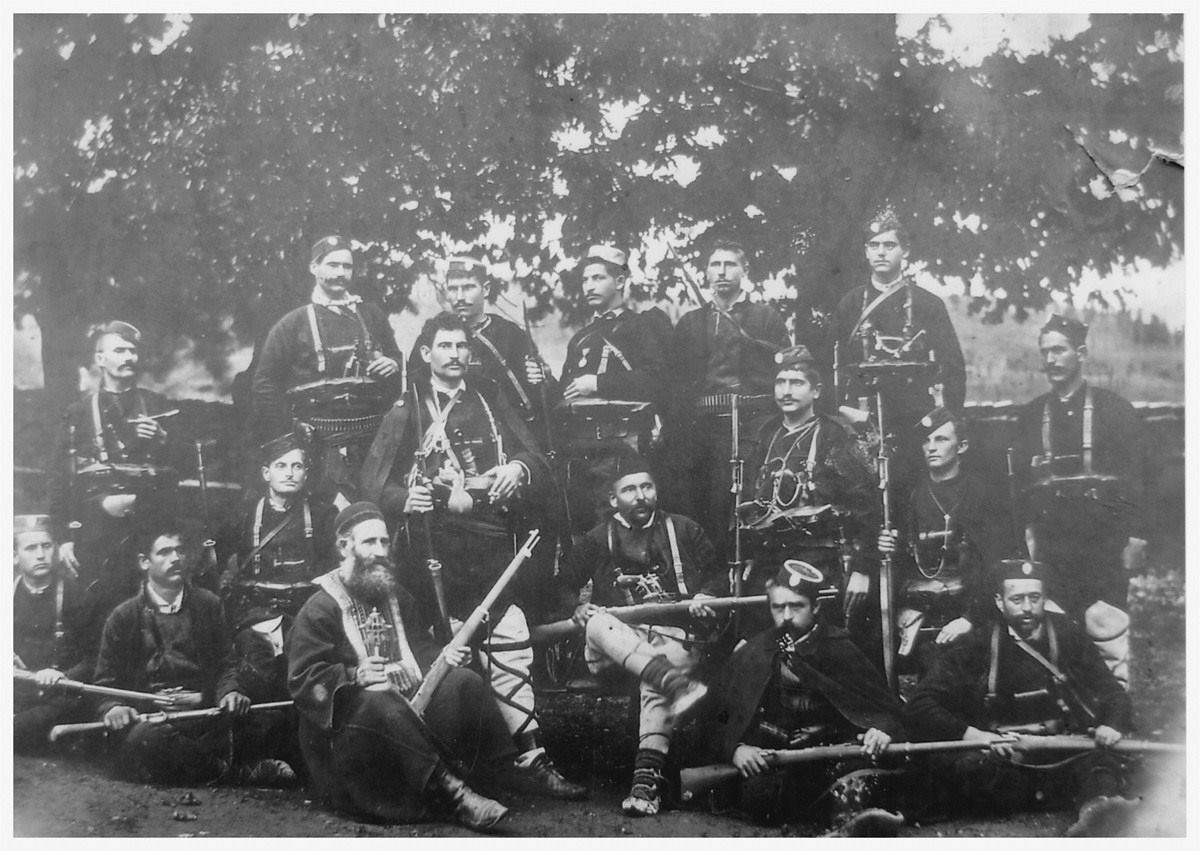
Cheta of Krsta Kovačević-Trgoviški, 1905

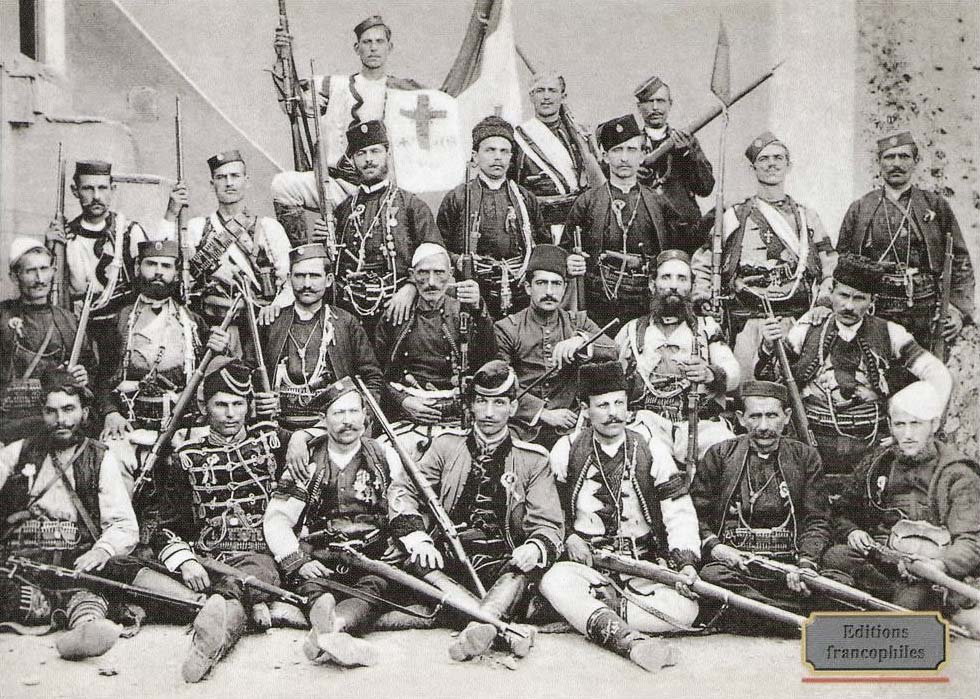
Group photo, taken during the Young Turk Revolution (1908). Krsta standing third in the second row (from the top), in dark attire.

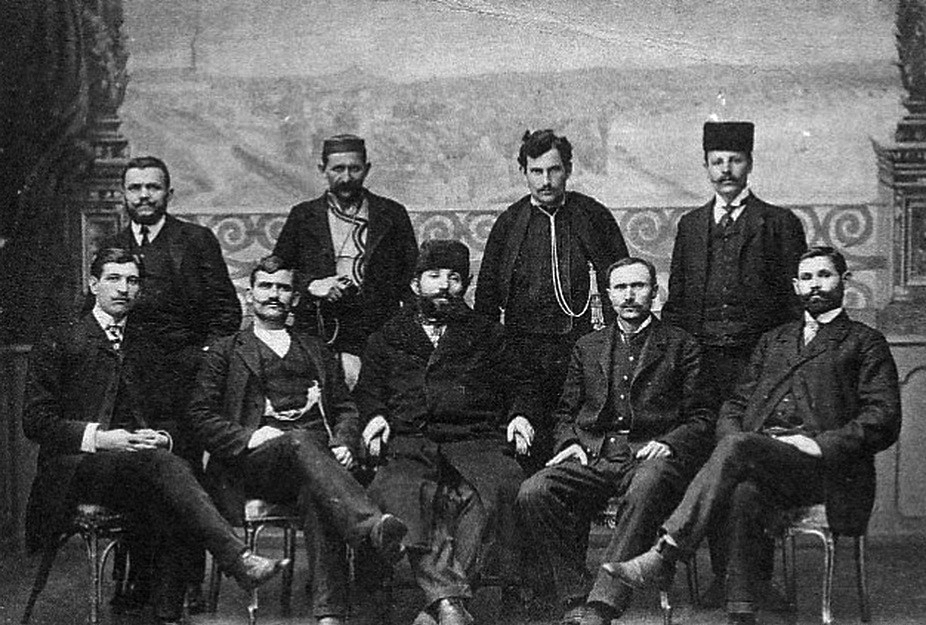
Group photo of some of the Serbian voivodes, 1908. Krsta standing third.

== First Balkan War ==
In the First Balkan War he participated as a vojvoda in the Chetnik detachment of vojvoda Vojin Popović-Vuk, his old friend. He participated in the battles of Kumanovo, Mukos and Bakarna Gumna.

== World War I ==
Kovačević participated in World War I as well, alongside six of his brothers and cousins. He independently led his band through Albania in 1915–16, and participated in the breakthrough of the Salonika front.

== Later years ==
In 1924 he led a band that pursued the band of Vancho Mihailov and bands of Albanian kachaks. During the German occupation of Serbia (1941–44) he lived secretly in Leskovac. He died in 1948, in Preševo.

== Sources ==
- Trbić, Vasilije (1996). Memoari: 1898-1912 (in Serbian). Kultura.
