= Spasa Garda =

Serbian Chetnik commander

Spasa Pavlović
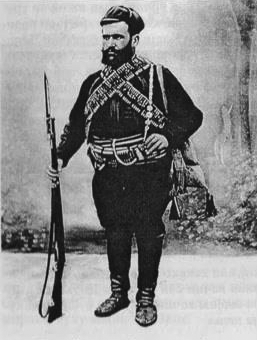
- Born: c. 1880; Stanča, Kosovo Vilayet, Ottoman Empire (now Kriva Palanka, R. Macedonia)
- Died: November 7, 1912
- Military career
- Allegiance: Serbian Chetnik Organization (1903–1908); (Kingdom of Serbia) Serbian Army (1912–1916)
- Service years: 1903–1916
- Rank: vojvoda (duke)
- Nickname: Spasa Garda
- Unit: Kriva Palanka
- Conflicts: Macedonian Struggle

Spasa Pavlović (Serbian Cyrillic: Спаса Павловић; c. 1880 – November 7, 1912), known as Spasa Garda (Спаса Гарда, "Spasa the Guard") or Zmaj (Змај, "the Dragon"), was a Serbian Chetnik commander in Old Serbia during the Macedonian Struggle (1903–1908). He received his nicknames from his high stature and bravery, and could be entrusted with highly secretive missions. He was born in the village of Stanča near Kriva Palanka, Ottoman Empire (modern R. Macedonia). From 1903, he was a jatak ("hajduk helper") for the Serbian bands whom he led the way in the woods and hills, and since 1904 he was a vojvoda (duke) in the Kriva Palanka area. His band defended the Kriva Palanka region from the IMRO, securing the Kriva river, which region was controlled by Serbian bands and where all villages were adhering to the Patriarchate (and not the Bulgarian Exarchate) and included in the Serbian Chetnik Organization. Spasa participated in all major battles on the left bank of the Vardar river. There, he helped destroy the local Bulgarian secret organization and Turkish (Ottoman) government. He is famed for his bravery in the battle on Paklište. After the Young Turk Revolution (1908), he returned to his village and lived a peaceful life. However, with the breakout of the First Balkan War, he joined the unit of Vojin Popović-Vuk, as the Serbian vanguard, and participated in all battles from the Serbian border to Prilep. He was wounded but declined medical care. He was killed in action in the fights for Prilep, on November 7, 1912, on the Alinački vis. He was buried in Prilep.

== See also ==
- List of Chetnik voivodes

== Sources ==
- Krakov, Stanislav (1990) [1930], Plamen četništva (in Serbian), Belgrade: Hipnos
- Trbić, Vasilije (1996). Memoari: 1898-1912 (in Serbian). Kultura. ISBN 9788678010132.
- Živković, Simo (December 1998), "SAKUPI SE JEDNA ČETA MALA", Srpsko Nasleđe Istorijske Sveske (12), Belgrade: PREDUZEĆE ZA NOVINSKO IZDAVAČKU DELATNOST "GLAS" d.d.o.
