= Tankosiq =

Village in Kosovo

Tankosiq (Dardani)
- Village
- Interactive map of Tankosiq (Dardani)
- Location within Kosovo Location within Europe
- Coordinates: 42°22′45″N 21°17′21″E
- Country: Kosovo
- District: Ferizaj
- Municipality: Ferizaj

Population (2024)
  - Total: 2,102
- Time zone: UTC+1 (CET)
  - Summer (DST): UTC+2 (CEST)

Tankosiq, also known as Dardani, is a village in Ferizaj Municipality, Kosovo. According to the Kosovo Agency of Statistics (KAS) from the 2024 census, there were 2,102 people residing in Tankosiq, with Albanians constituting the majority of the population.

== History ==
During World War II, the village's Serb population was subjected to expulsions, murders and pillaging by Albanian paramilitaries.
