= Beljakovce =

Beljakovce Бељаковце
- Village
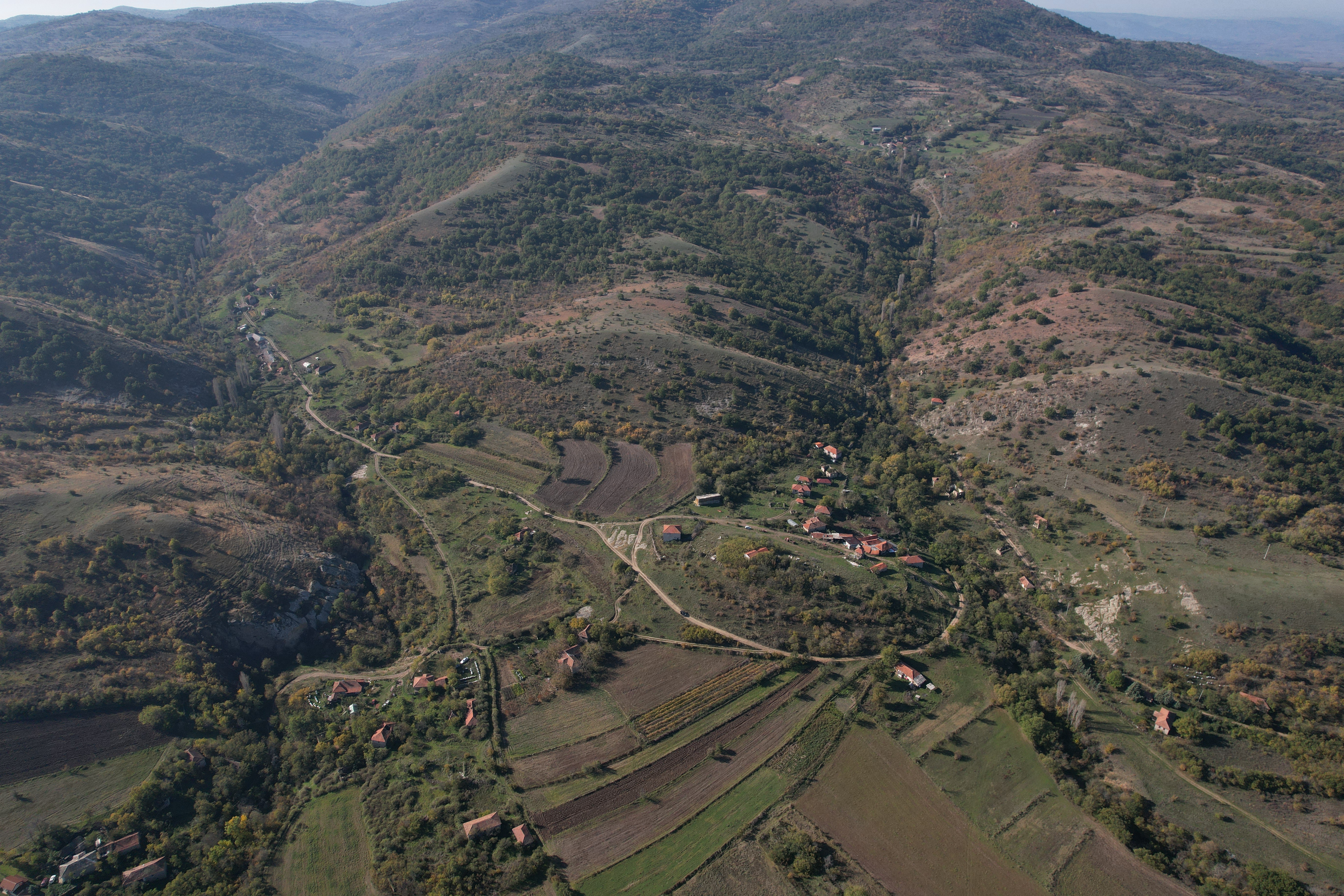
- Airview of the village

- Location within North Macedonia
- Coordinates: 42°06′55″N 21°55′48″E
- Country: North Macedonia
- Region: Northeastern
- Municipality: Kumanovo

Population (2021)
  - Total: 54
- Time zone: UTC+1 (CET)
  - Summer (DST): UTC+2 (CEST)
- Postal code: 1304
- Car plates: KU
- Website: .

Beljakovce (Macedonian: Бељаковце) is a village in the municipality of Kumanovo, North Macedonia.

== Demographics ==
As of the 2021 census, Beljakovce had 54 residents with the following ethnic composition:

- Macedonians 25
- Others 23
- Persons for whom data are taken from administrative sources 6
