= Vojislav Tankosić =

Serbian major and member of the Black Hand (1880–1915)

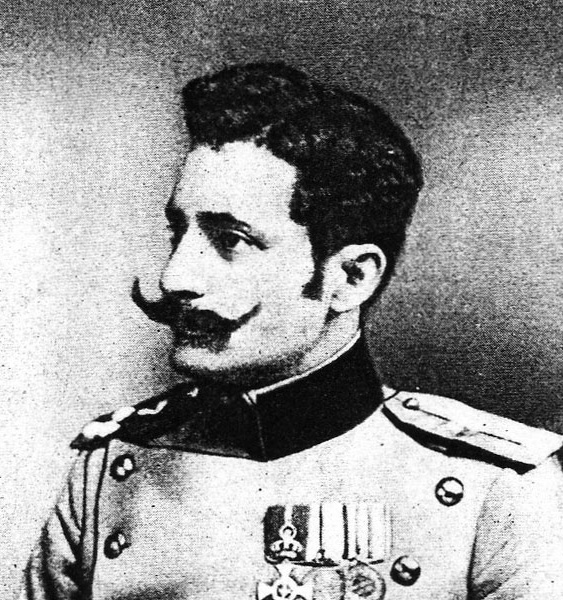
- Born: 20 September 1880; Ruklada, Principality of Serbia
- Died: 2 November 1915 (aged 35); Trstenik, Kingdom of Serbia
- Burial place: New Cemetery, Belgrade
- Military career
- Allegiance: Kingdom of Serbia (1903–15): Serbian Chetnik Organization (1903–08)
- Service years: 1903–1915
- Rank: vojvoda, major
- Nicknames: Voja, Šilja
- Conflicts: Chetniks in Macedonia; Balkan Wars; World War I
- Awards: Order of the Star of Karađorđe (1905); Order of the Star of Karađorđe with Swords (1913)

Vojislav Tankosić (Serbian Cyrillic: Војислав Танкосић, 20 September 1880 – 2 November 1915) was a Serbian military officer, vojvoda of the Serbian Chetnik Organization, major of the Serbian Army, and member of the Black Hand, who participated in the May Coup and was accused of involvement in the assassination of Archduke Franz Ferdinand.

== Overview ==
Tankosić was born in Ruklada, in the Tamnava region near Valjevo. His family came from Bosnian Krajina. He graduated from the gymnasium and from the prestigious Military Academy.

Tankosić came to the attention of the Serbian public as a young officer when he set about assaulting an English reporter who had allegedly defamed Serbia and who passing through Belgrade; the Serbian police rescued the young Winston Churchill and sent him on his way. Tankosić's demonstrated high national consciousness gained him the trust of Milorad Gođevac and the other Chetnik leaders. He was sent as a secret agent, undercover, into Ottoman Macedonia to study the terrain and people for future action.

As Dragutin Dimitrijević Apis' trustee, Tankosić executed Queen Draga's two brothers in 1903 in the May Coup, which saw the overthrow and murder of King Alexander Obrenović. He participated in the Battle of Čelopek (April 1905) under Savatije Milošević. Young Bosnia received arms from him for their actions. Sources say that he shot apples from the heads of his Chetnik fighters. Once, when they crossed the Sava bridge, he ordered all to jump off, and they did.

Tankosić was described as rude and bold. He was arrested by the Serbian government when Gavrilo Princip killed Archduke Franz Ferdinand (28 June 1914), but was forgiven when Austria attacked Serbia; the Chetniks of Voja Tankosić and Jovan Babunski prevented Belgrade from falling into Austrian hands on the first night of the war. He then fought at the Drina (September 6–October 4, 1914). His unit retreated last, covering the Austrians and Germans, and he was fatally wounded near Veliki Popović. He lived for two days, then died in Trstenik on November 2, 1915. When the Austrians occupied the town, they excavated his body from the grave to make sure he was indeed dead. A photograph of his body featured on the front pages of Croatian, Hungarian, Bulgarian and Austrian newspapers. He was re-buried in Trstenik, and his mother and friends had his body transferred to Belgrade for an honorable burial on the New Cemetery in 1923.

== May Coup ==
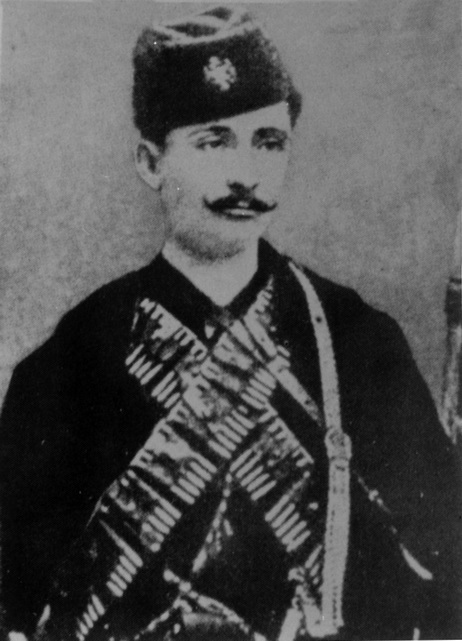
Vojislav Tankosić in Chetnik gear.

In a period of great national fervour among the Serb youth organizations, Tankosić tried to gain the trust of General Jovan Atanacković, who had begun to gather volunteers for insurgency in Old Serbia and Macedonia. As a sub-lieutenant, he participated in the conspiracy against King Alexander Obrenović, and the May Coup (1903). He had previously helped the leaders of the March demonstrations (1903) to flee with boats to Zemun. He led the execution of Queen Draga's brothers, Nikola and Nikodije.

== Guerrilla fighting ==
As a member of the Serbian Chetnik Organization, Tankosić went to Skopje, Bitola and Thessaloniki in the winter of 1903–04, where he organized Chetnik action in Macedonia. Tankosić was one of the most important Chetnik voivodes, and was an excellent shot. He participated in the victory on Čelopek near Kumanovo on April 16, 1905, part of the četa (unit) of vojvoda Savatije Milošević. There was a pause in action due to the Serbian-Bulgarian customs union's conclusion on July 6, 1905; thus, Tankosić was brought back to Serbia, where he was awarded the Order of the Star of Karađorđe. From the second half of 1905 to October 1907, he attended and graduated from the Military Academy in Belgrade. In 1907–08 he was the Chief of Staff of Eastern Povardarje, which meant that he commanded all units active from the Serbian border to the Vardar. He led the attack on Bulgarian bands in the village of Stracin in 1908, which nearly caused a Serbian-Bulgarian war. He returned to Belgrade in July 1908.

== Black Hand ==
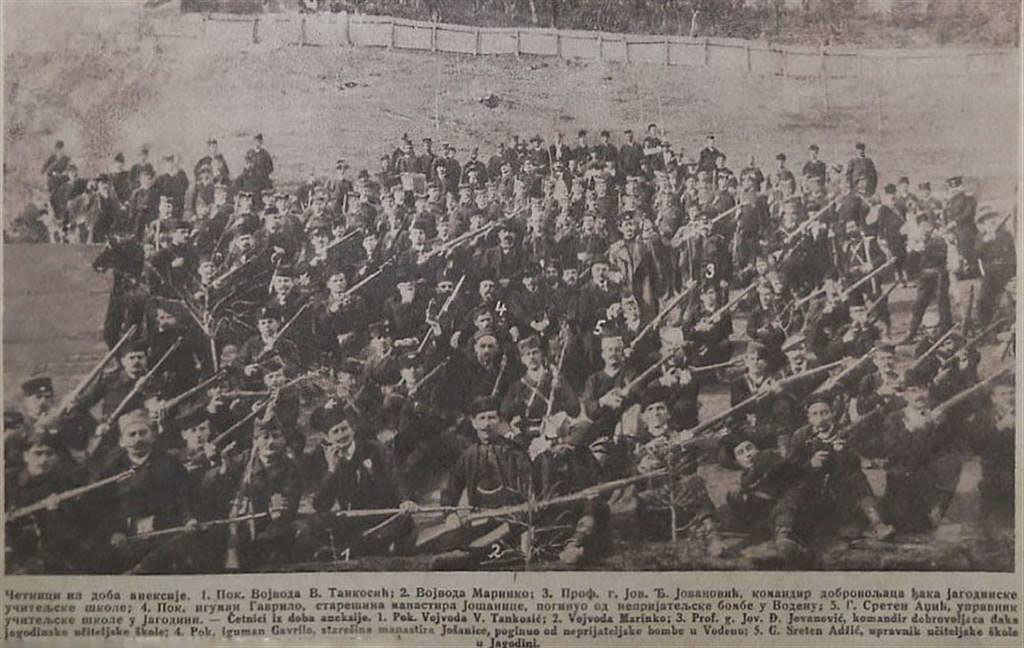
Chetniks during the Bosnian crisis (1908), Tankosić is noted as (1).

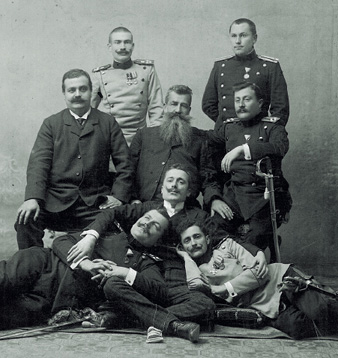
Some of the members of the Black Hand, Apis and Tankosić seen lying down.

Following the Austro-Hungarian annexation of Bosnia and Herzegovina (October 6, 1908), Tankosić established a Chetnik school in Prokuplje, in which volunteers were trained to execute special operations in Bosnia and Herzegovina. He spread the network throughout Bosnia and Herzegovina, and recruited volunteers for a conflict he believed was inevitable. This was contrary to the policy of the Serbian government, which feared Austro-Hungary. Some 5,000 volunteers were organized in Serbia. Austrian and Hungarian newspapers reported that there were 1,000 bands in Serbia, with 20 well-armed fighters in each, and that each fighter would give one of his two guns to Bosnian rebels. However, when Serbia recognized the annexation in 1909, the training camp in Ćuprija was closed down; the military knowledge that was gained was useful in the coming war. He was a member of the Young Bosnia and one of the founders of Unification or Death (popularly known as the "Black Hand"). Together with Bogdan Radenković and Ljuba Jovanović-Čupa, he wrote the constitution of the organization, whose aim was to fight for the unification of Serb lands.

== Balkan Wars ==
Before the outbreak of the war in March 1912, Tankosić was transferred to the headquarters of the border troops, tasked with training volunteers who arrived from all Serb-inhabited regions. Tankosić was very strict in his selection, and out of 2,000 candidates, he chose only 245 volunteers. One who was declined was Gavrilo Princip, due to his weak stature. The Serbian government tried to use the Albanians against the Turks, and sent Tankosić to Kosovo where he slipped weapons to Albanian leaders. Together with Isa Boletini, he led local Albanians in June and July 1912 in their conflict with Turks around Mitrovica.

In the First Balkan War Tankosić commanded the Laplje Chetnik detachment. The detachment began operations in the Ottoman rear lines two days before the outbreak of the war, at the border post (karaula) at Merdare, where the Chetniks and Albanians engaged in the first battle of the war. It seems that they began fighting on their own initiative, without the approval of superiors. There is a possibility that the Black Hand feared agreement between Turkey and the Balkan allies, which would delay the liberation of Serb-inhabited territories. The Chetniks fought for three days by themselves, until the regular Serbian Army joined in. The Serbian Army brought victory, and Tankosić's Chetniks were the first to enter Pristina. Tankosić's Chetniks thus opened the door for the Serbian Army to liberate Kosovo, and Tankosić was awarded the Order of the Star of Karađorđe with Swords and promoted to major.

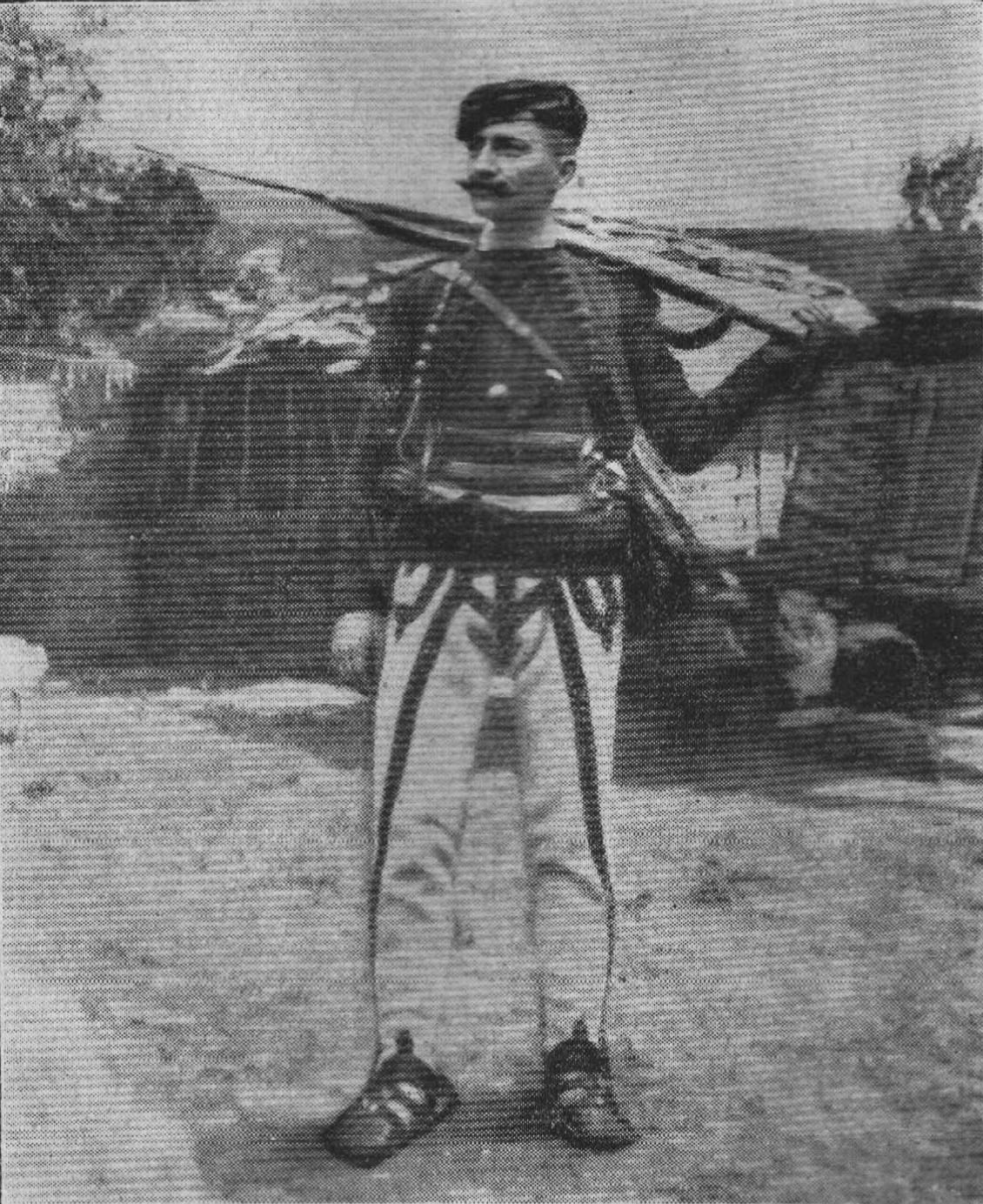
Vojislav Tankosić outside Isa Boletini's house, 1911.

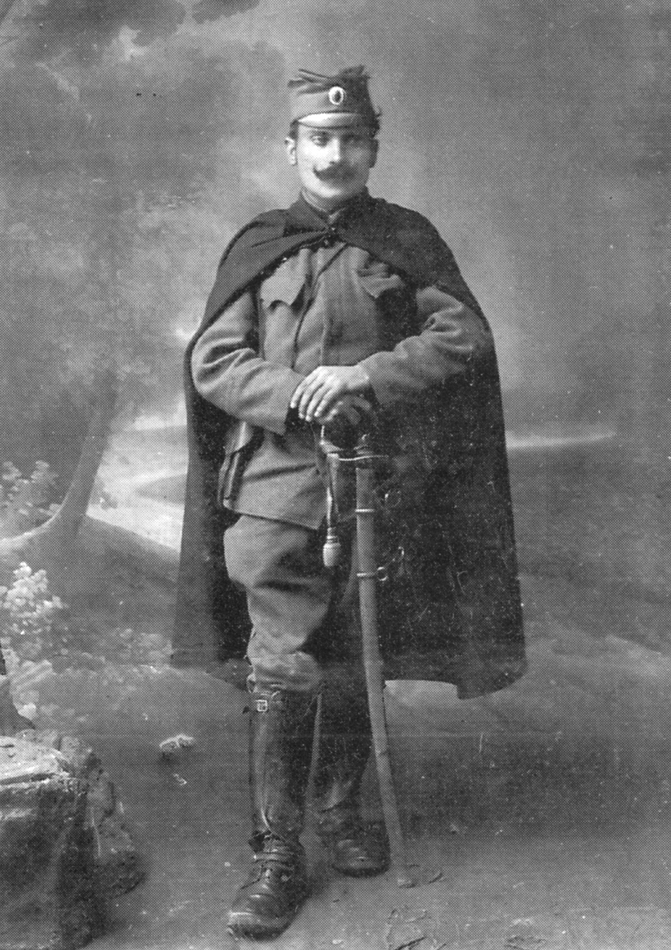
Vojislav Tankosić, as a captain, 1912–13.

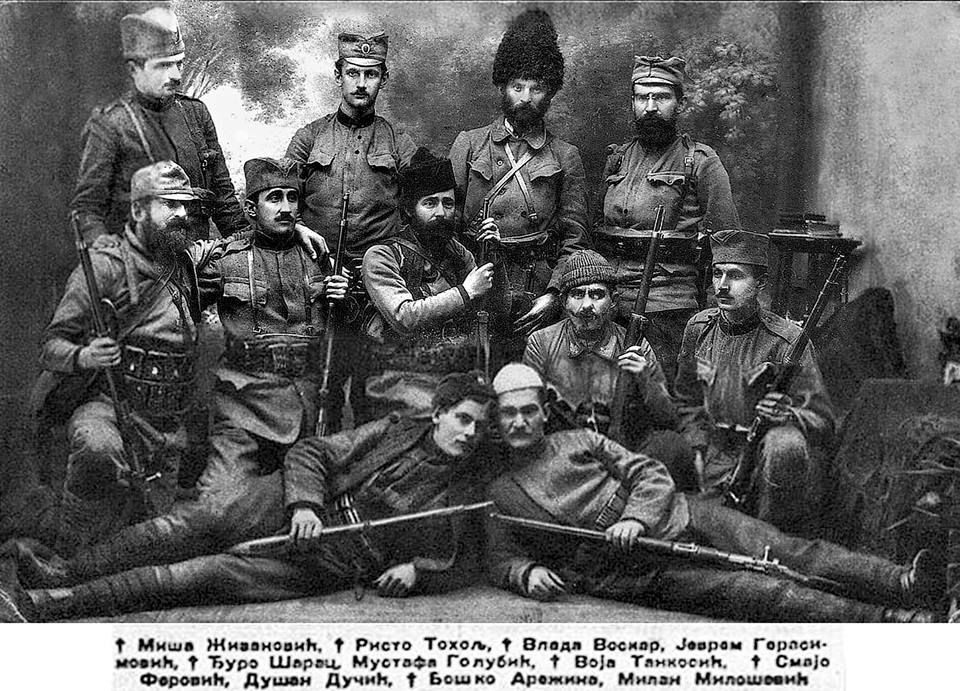
Tankosić with the best fighters of his unit during the Balkan Wars.

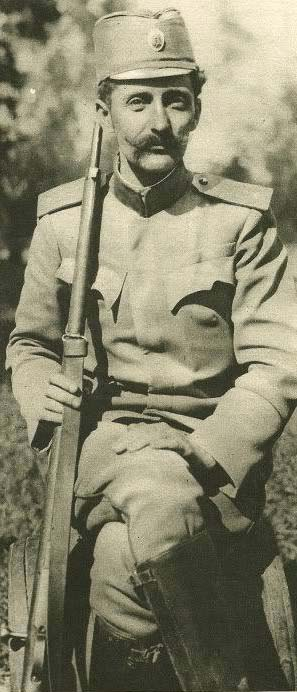
Tankosić as a major

== 1913 and Archduke assassination plot ==
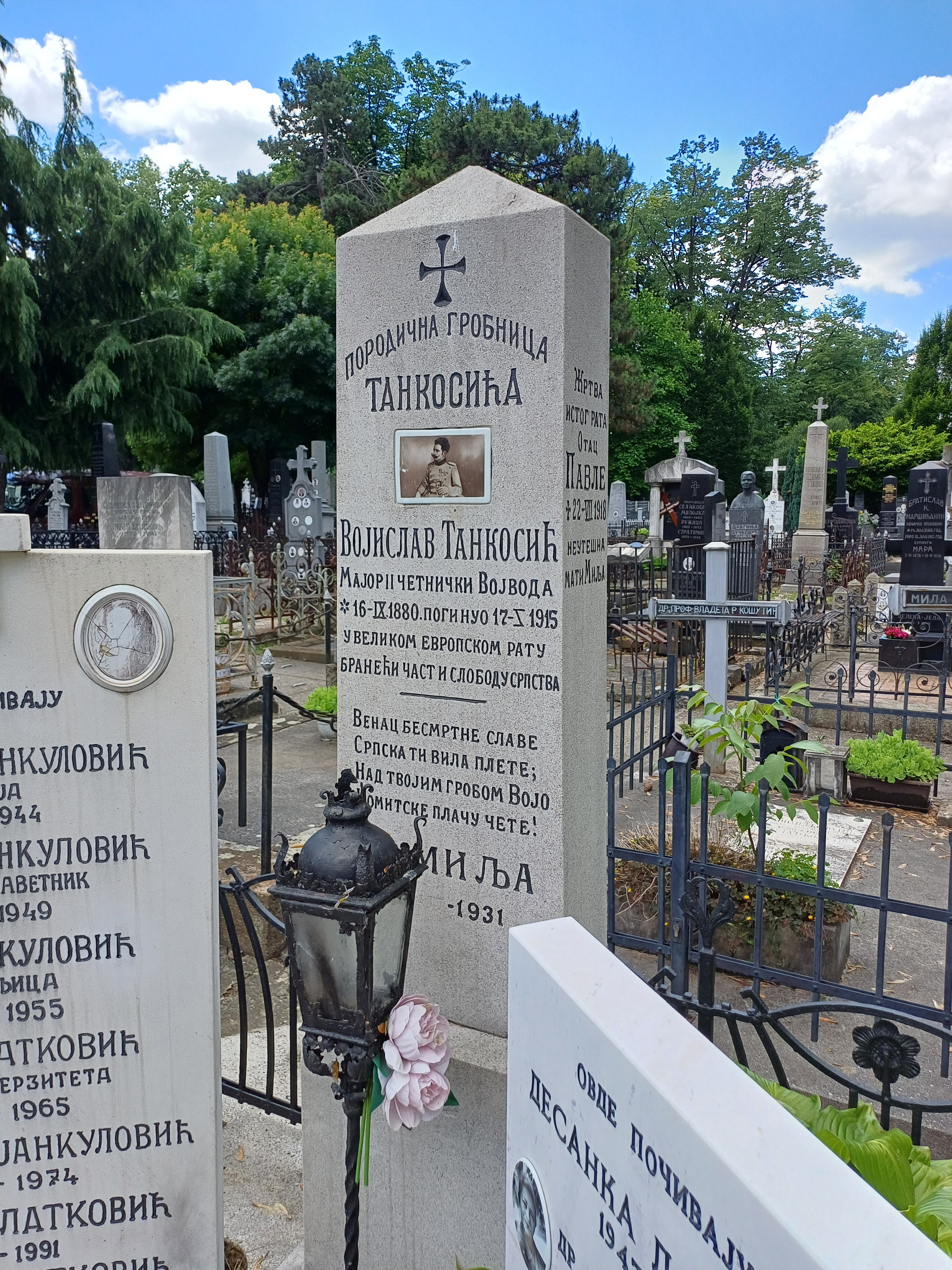
Tanković's grave in Belgrade New Cemetery

Together with the other members of the Black Hand, Tankosić pressured the Serbian government of Nikola Pašić before the Treaty of Bucharest (1913). The government tried to retire Tankosić and Apis; however, the King disagreed. A conflict between the military and civilian authorities simmered during 1913 and escalated during 1914, with open threats made to certain ministers. It is claimed that he participated in the training of the assassins of Archduke Franz Ferdinand, arranged to smuggle them across the Drina, and had his agent Ciganović provide them with weapons. After the 1914 assassination, the Austro-Hungarian government gave an ultimatum to the Serbian government, whom they held responsible for the assassination; Tankosić was thus imprisoned in the headquarters of the Danube Division I. He was forgiven when Austria attacked Serbia.

== World War I ==
After the outbreak of World War I, Tankosić became the commander of the Volunteer Squad in Belgrade, and then the Rudnik Volunteer Squad. By the time of the Battle of Drina (1914), he commanded a special band of volunteers and Chetniks in the Lim detachment in Eastern Bosnia, then at Loznica, Krupanj, at Mačkov Kamen and other battlefields. With the outbreak of World War I, Jovan Babunski formed the Sava Chetnik detachment, which was then placed under the command of Major Vojislav Tankosić. The unit went on to fight the Austro-Hungarians in the late summer of 1914 and later destroyed a railway bridge on the Sava River to prevent Austro-Hungarian forces from crossing it.

== 1915 operations and death ==
During the Serbian Army withdrawal in 1915, Tankosić was mortally wounded in Igrište near Veliki Popović on October 31, 1915, while commanding a battalion. He died from his wounds on November 2, 1915 at the age of 35 in Trstenik. His soldiers took his body and buried him secretly at the local cemetery. The Austrians managed to find the burial place and dug up his body, and, after identifying him, took pictures for the media to convince the public that he was indeed dead. The article, titled "The End of Tankosić", mentioned the Serbian throne and the ultimatum to Serbia, and claimed the death of Tankosić as a victory against their opponents. The remains were relocated by his mother Milja, with the help of the Association of Serb Chetniks, and buried in the Belgrade New Cemetery in 1922. The tomb is now located at the IV parcel, in the third row, grave no. 6.

== Awards ==
The honours Tankosić received for his courage include:

- Order of the Star of Karađorđe, received in 1905
- Order of the Star of Karađorđe with Swords, received in 1913

== Legacy ==
The village of Tankosiq (Serbian: Tankosić) near Uroševac bears his name, as well as streets in the Vračar neighbourhood in Belgrade, the Medijana neighbourhood in Niš, and the Kisač neighbourhood in Novi Sad.

== See also ==
- List of Chetnik voivodes
