= Đorđe Skopljanče =

Serbian rebel

Đorđe Ristić–Skopljanče
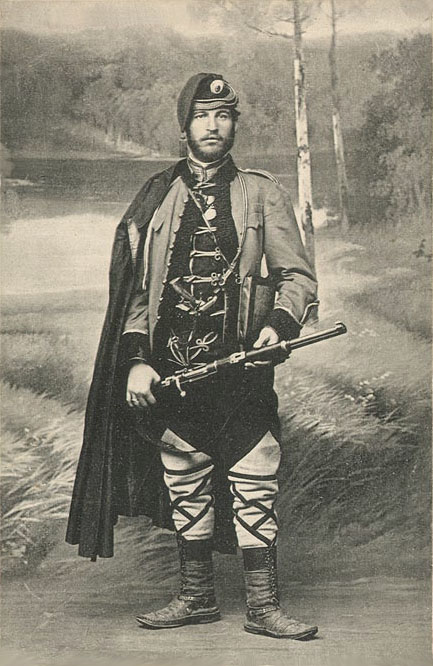
- "Vojvoda Đorđe Ristić Skopljanče", postcard
- Born: 6 August 1881; İpek, Kosovo Vilayet, Ottoman Empire
- Died: 1911 (aged 30); Niš, Kingdom of Serbia
- Military career
- Allegiance: Serbian Chetnik Organization (1904–1910)
- Service years: 1904–1910
- Nickname: "Vojvoda Đorđe Skopljanče"
- Conflicts: Macedonian Struggle

Đorđe Ristić also George Ristić (Serbian Cyrillic: Ђорђе Ристић; 6 August 1881 — 1911), known as Đorđe Skopljanče (Ђорђе Скопљанче), was a Serbian Chetnik commander who fought in Old Serbia and Macedonia.

== Life ==
Ristić was born in İpek, Kosovo Vilayet, Ottoman Empire (now Kosovo) into a Serb family. He finished high school in Skoplje, hence his nickname Skopljanče (a demonym). He then enrolled in the non-commissioned officer school in Belgrade in 1904, and with the rank of sergeant (narednik) he joined the Serbian Chetnik Organization and immediately crossed the Serbian-Ottoman border. Due to his bravery, he gained the title of vojvoda (duke) the same year. He participated in the battles on Guglin, Petralica and Čelopek in that year. His designated area was the Kumanovo region where he constantly clashed with Bulgarian vojvode Krsto Konjushki. He died in 1911 as a result of the extreme conditions he faced during guerilla fighting in the open outdoors under bad weather. He was buried in Niš, where the Narodna Odbrana erected a monument in his honour, in 1913.

== See also ==
- List of Chetnik voivodes

== Sources ==
- Krakov, Stanislav (1990) [1930]. Plamen četništva (in Serbian). Belgrade: Hipnos.
- Trbić, Vasilije (1996). Memoari: 1898-1912 (in Serbian). Kultura. ISBN 9788678010132.
- P. Pešić, Četnički pokret u Kraljevini Srbiji 1903-1918, Krgujevac 2007, 385
- P. D. S., Jerinić, Vojvode iz četničke akcije u Staroj Srbiji i Maćedoniji 1903-1912, Dobrovoljački glasnik, br. 32, Beograd 2008, 32
