= Stanislav Krakov =

Serbian soldier and writer

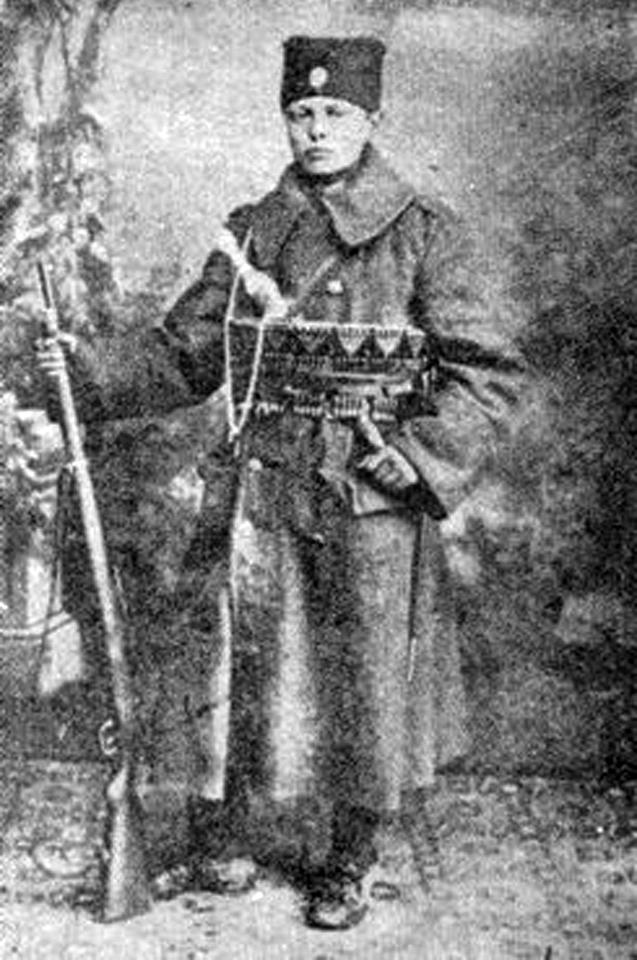
- Stanislav Krakov
- Born: 29 March 1895; Kragujevac, Kingdom of Serbia
- Died: 15 December 1968 (aged 73) Geneve, Switzerland
- Allegiance: Kingdom of Serbia
- Awards: Albanian Medal

Stanislav Krakov (Serbian Cyrillic: Станислав Краков; 1895–1968) was a Serbian officer, Chetnik guerrilla, journalist, writer and film director. He participated in the Balkan Wars and First World War. During the Second World War, he supported his maternal uncle, General Milan Nedić, and was the editor of Nedić's newspapers Novo vreme and Obnova.

== Early life ==
Krakov was born in Kragujevac, Kingdom of Serbia. His father, Sigismund, was a doctor of Polish origin, and his mother Persida was a granddaughter of Nikola Stanojević, a lord from Zeoke and nephew of voivode Stanoje Mijailović, who was killed during the First Serbian Uprising.

== Military service ==
Not being able to enroll in the regular army, since he was only 17 years old, he joined the volunteer guard of Vojvoda Vuk, a Chetnik unit, in the war against the Ottoman Empire in 1912. The following year he was back on the frontline of the Serbian defence, this time against Bulgaria, where he was wounded near Kriva Palanka. Together with the last class of cadets-corporals, he left the military academy in 1914 and went straight to the front to fight the Austro-Hungarian Empire. For much of 1914 he, much to his frustration, was assigned to Pirot which was far from the front. In 1915 he participated in many battles, survived the Serbian army's retreat through Albania, and was one of the first who reached the top of the impregnable Kajmakčalan. During these wars he was wounded seventeen times and was awarded eighteen times. In 1937 Krakov became chief of Propaganda for Zbor thanks to Dimitrije Ljotić and subsequently, the editor-in-chief of the pro-Nazi Obnova newspaper, hailing from Belgrade.

== Literary and film career ==
After the First World War, from 1919 to 1931, he published prose in almost all newspapers and magazines in Serbia. He wrote novels: "Kroz buru" (1921), "Krila" (1922), travel guide "Kroz južnu Srbiju" (1926), memoirs "Naše poslednje pobede" (1928), a book of short stories "Crveni pjero". When it comes to historical-fiction works, he wrote "Plamen četništva" (1930), "Prestolonaslednik Petar" (1933) and "General Milan Nedić" (1963-1968). "Život čoveka na Balkanu" ("Life of the Man from the Balkans") was his autobiography. Stanislav Krakov was a director of the film "Za čast otadžbine i požar na Balkanu", which premiered on 25 March 1930, and also "Golgota Srbije" (The Calvary of Serbia) in 1931, which is still regarded as the best Serbian documentary film account of World War I ever. He was editor of "Politika" and "Vreme", and CEO of Radio Belgrade (1940-1941). While working for Vreme magazine, Krakov traveled to Fritz Lang's house in 1932 and interviewed him. During the Second World War he supported his uncle, General Milan Nedić, and the rest of his life he spent in exile. He died in Switzerland.

In his autobiography "Život čoveka na Balkanu" ("Life of a Man from the Balkans"), which was published posthumously, Stanislav wrote:

I felt all the high points of success and all the bitterness and humiliation when you reach the bottom of human society. If the adventure is always an unexpected twist, always a surprise, most commonly a danger, usually a dazzling success, and even more hursh fall, then I lived a crazy, often brilliant and painful adventure of my time and my native soil...

== Bibliography ==
- "Kroz buru" (1921)
- "Krila" (1922)
- "Kroz južnu Srbiju" (1926)
- "Naše poslednje pobede" (1928)
- "Crveni pjero"
- "Plamen četništva" (1930)
- "Prestolonaslednik Petar" (1933)
- "General Milan Nedić" (1963-1968)
- "Život čoveka na Balkanu"
