= Zabrčani =

Zabrčani / Zabrchani Забрчани
- Village
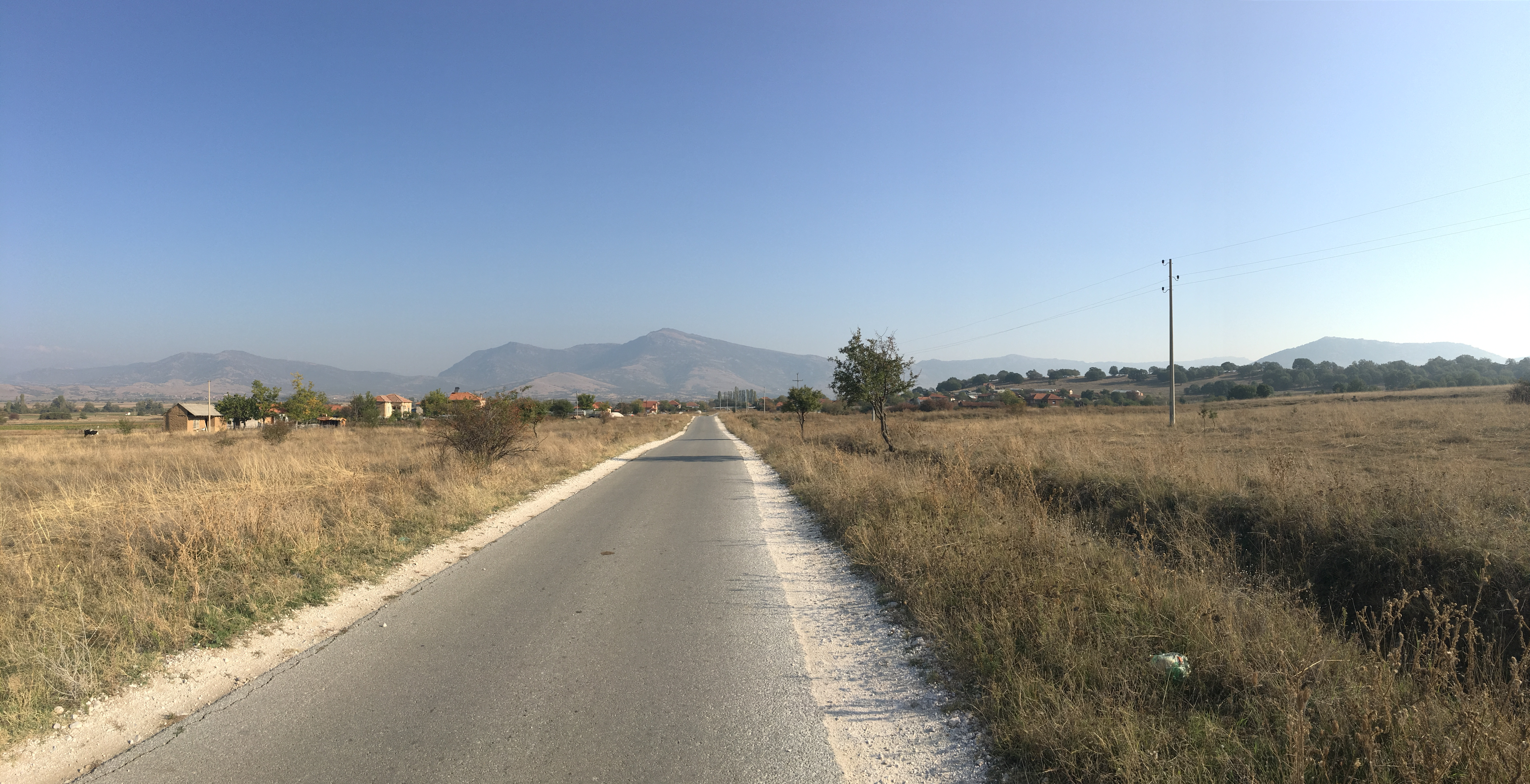

- Location within North Macedonia
- Country: North Macedonia
- Region: Pelagonia
- Municipality: Dolneni
- Elevation: 660 m (2,170 ft)

Population (2021)
  - Total: 50
- Time zone: UTC+1 (CET)
- Area code: +38948

Zabrčani (Macedonian: Забрчани) is a village in the municipality of Dolneni, North Macedonia.

Cities, towns and places in Dolneni near Zabrčani include Malo Mramorani, Dupjačani, Senokos and Gorno Selo. The closest major cities include Skopje (in North Macedonia), Pristina (in Kosovo), Tirana (in Albania) and Thessaloniki (in Greece).

== Demographics ==
According to the 2021 census, the village had a total of 50 inhabitants. Ethnic groups in the village include:

- Macedonians 49
- Persons for whom data are taken from administrative sources 1

Year	Macedonian	Albanian	Turks	Romani	Vlachs	Serbs	Bosniaks	Persons for whom data are taken from admin. sources	Total
2002	72	...	...	...	...	...	...	...	72
2021	49	...	...	...	...	...	...	1	50
