= Novoselani =

Novoselani (Cyrillic: Новоселани) may refer to:

- Novoselani, Dolneni a village in Municipality of Dolneni
- Novoselani, Mogila a village in Municipality of Mogila
- Novoselani, Češinovo-Obleševo a village in Municipality of Češinovo-Obleševo
