= Sredorek =

Sredorek may refer to:

Antarctica

- Sredorek Peak

Bulgaria

- Sredorek, Kyustendil Province

North Macedonia

- Sredorek (region)
- Sredorek, Dolneni, a village
- Sredorek (Roma neighbourhood), in Kumanovo
