= Senokos =

Senokos ("haystack" in English) may refer to:

Bulgaria

- Senokos, Blagoevgrad Province
- Senokos, Dobrich Province

North Macedonia

- Senokos, Dolneni
- Senokos, Vrapčište

Serbia

- Senokos, Dimitrovgrad
