= Peštalevo =

Peštalevo Пешталево Peshtalevë
- Village
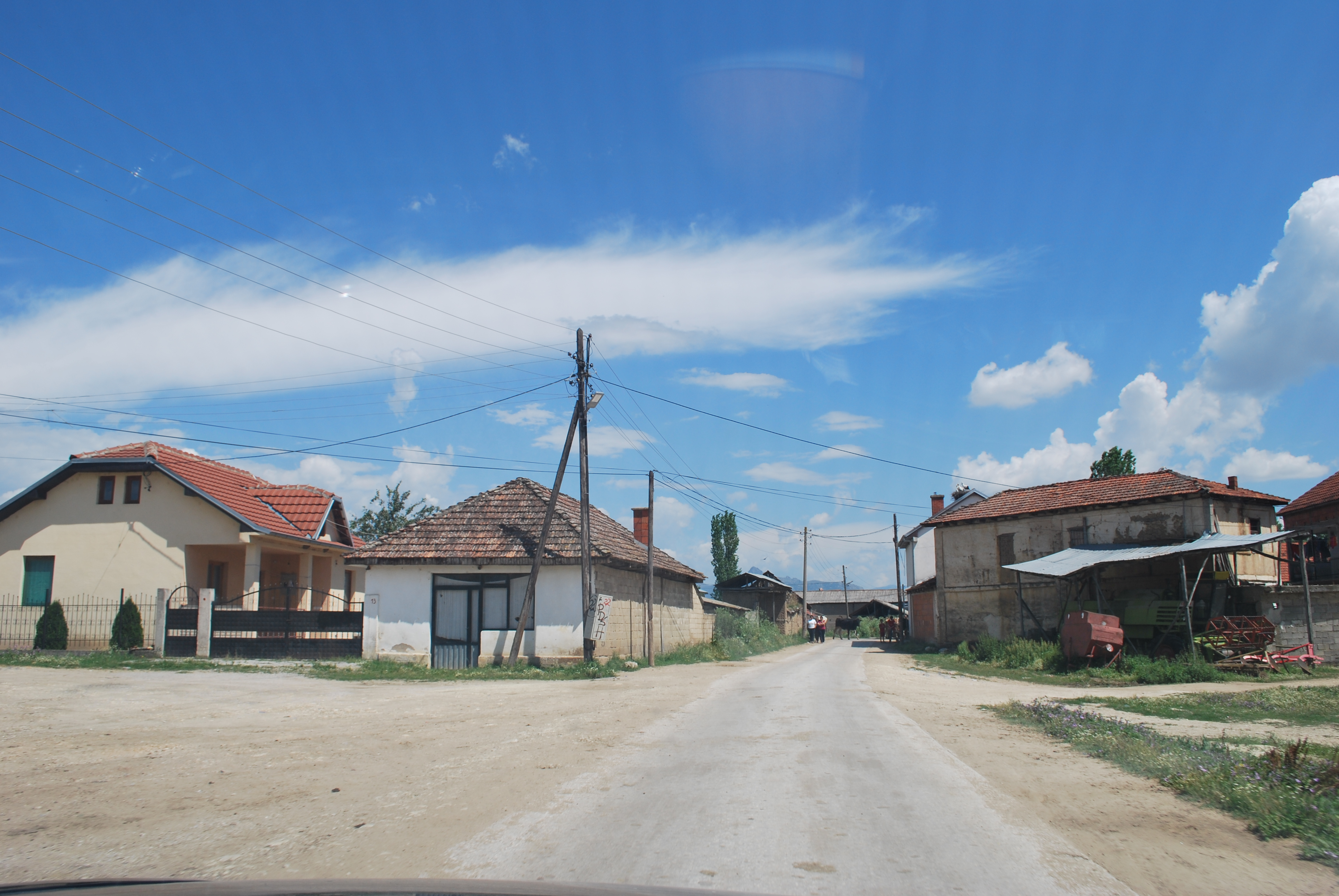
- Peštalevo

- Location within North Macedonia
- Coordinates: 41°27′46″N 21°23′48″E
- Country: North Macedonia
- Region: Pelagonia
- Municipality: Dolneni

Population (2021)
  - Total: 511
- Time zone: UTC+1 (CET)
  - Summer (DST): UTC+2 (CEST)
- Area code: +38948
- Car plates: PP
- Website: .

Peštalevo (Macedonian: Пешталево, Albanian: Peshtalevë) is a village located in a lowland area in the municipality of Dolneni, North Macedonia.

== History and Demographics ==
The village traditionally contains a Torbeš population that speaks the Macedonian language, descended from three brothers (Abdul, Sinan and Suljo). The three siblings originated from one of the Muslim Slavic villages in the Debar region (now on the modern Albanian side of the border) arriving to Peštalevo in the second half of the 18th century. Torbeši's of Peštalevo are divided into many households split into three groups referred to by patronyms based on their ancestors (Abdulovci, Sinanovci and Suljovci). Between 1954 - 1960 large scale migration from Peštalevo by Torbeš to Turkey occurred, while Orthodox Macedonians from the Poreče region settled in the village. The village also contains residents originating from the village of Brailovo. Torbeš from Peštalevo refer to the surrounding Christian population as Makedonci (Macedonians) and those Orthodox Macedonians refer to them as Turci (Turks) due to they being Muslims. The village also has an ethnic Albanian population.

According to the 2021 census, the village had a total of 511 inhabitants. Ethnic groups in the village include:

- Macedonians 254
- Albanians 119
- Turks 93
- Serbs 1
- Bosniaks 30
- Others 14

Year	Macedonian	Albanian	Turks	Romani	Vlachs	Serbs	Bosniaks	Others	Total
2002	280	144	44	...	...	1	12	5	486
2021	254	119	93	...	...	1	30	14	511
