= Trbić =

Trbić is a Serbo-Croatian surname. Notable people with the surname include:

- Marko Trbić (born 1974), Bosnian basketball coach
- Milivoje Trbić, Yugoslav military officer
- Milorad Trbić (born 1958), Bosnian Serb military officer
- Vasilije Trbić (1881–1962), Serbian military officer
