= Golemo Mramorani =

Coordinates: 41°24′05″N 21°30′12″E

Golemo Mramorani Големо Мраморани
- Former village
- Interactive map of Golemo Mramorani
- Country: North Macedonia
- Municipality: Dolneni
- Statistical Region: Pelagonia

Population (2002)
  - Total: 0
- Time zone: UTC+1 (CET)
- Area code: +38948

Gоlemo Mramorani is a former village in Municipality of Dolneni.
