= Gorno Selo =

Gorno Selo may refer to:

- Gorno Selo, Sofia Province, Bulgaria
- Gorno Selo, Dolneni, North Macedonia
