= Slivje =

Slivje may refer to:

- Slivje, Dolneni, North Macedonia
- Slivje (Svrljig), Serbia
