= Kostinci =

Kostinci Костинци
- Village
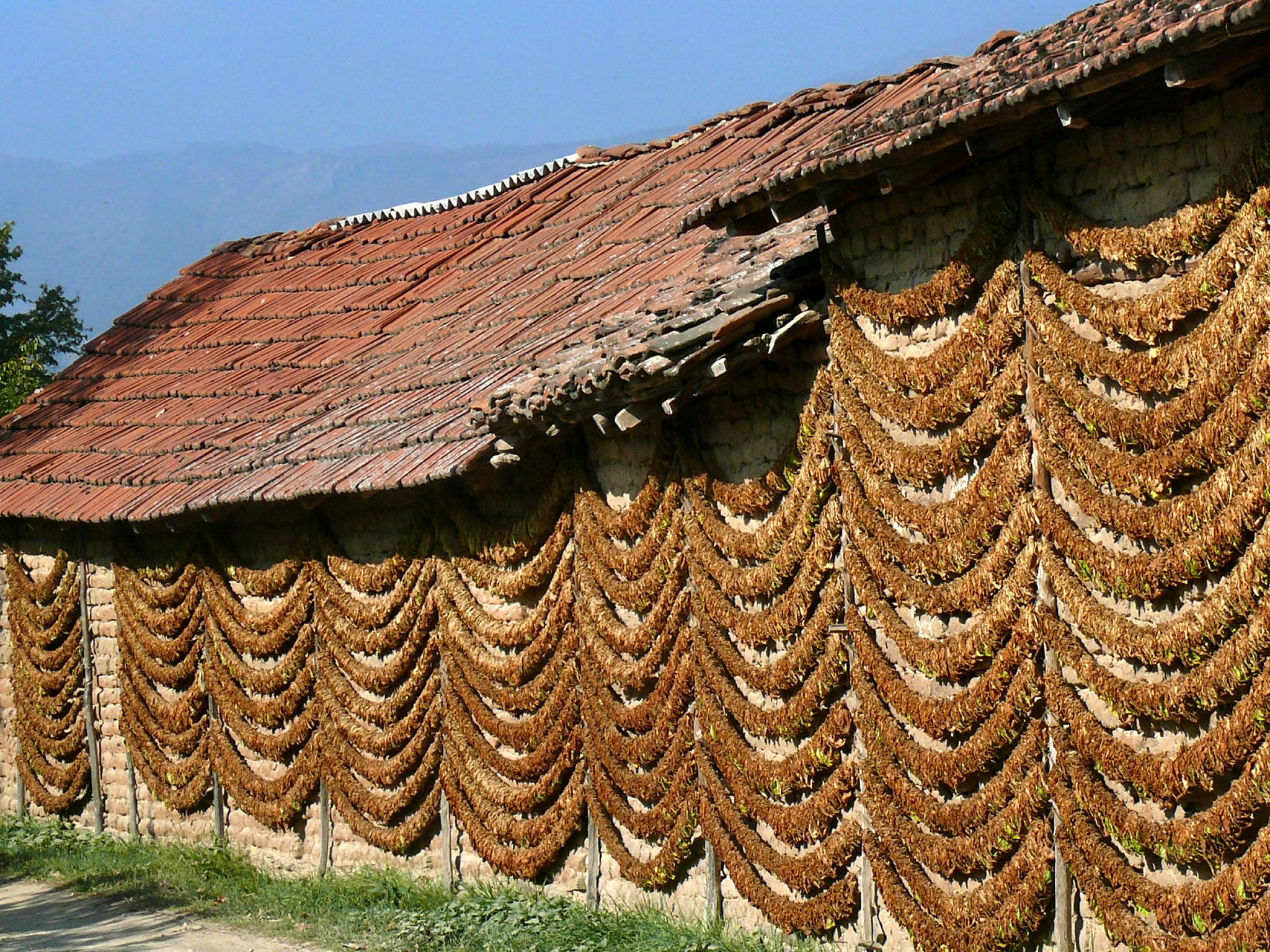

- Location within North Macedonia
- Country: North Macedonia
- Region: Pelagonia
- Municipality: Dolneni
- Elevation: 618 m (2,028 ft)

Population (2021)
  - Total: 72
- Time zone: UTC+1 (CET)
- Postal code: 7505
- Area code: +38948

Kostinci (Macedonian: Костинци) is a village in the municipality of Dolneni, North Macedonia.

== Demographics ==
According to the 2021 census, the village had a total of 72 inhabitants. Ethnic groups in the village include:

- Macedonians 71
- Others 1

Year	Macedonian	Albanian	Turks	Romani	Vlachs	Serbs	Bosniaks	Persons for whom data are taken from admin. sources	Total
2002	101	...	...	...	...	...	...	...	101
2021	71	...	...	...	...	...	...	1	72
