= Sekirci =

Sekirci Sekirci
- Village
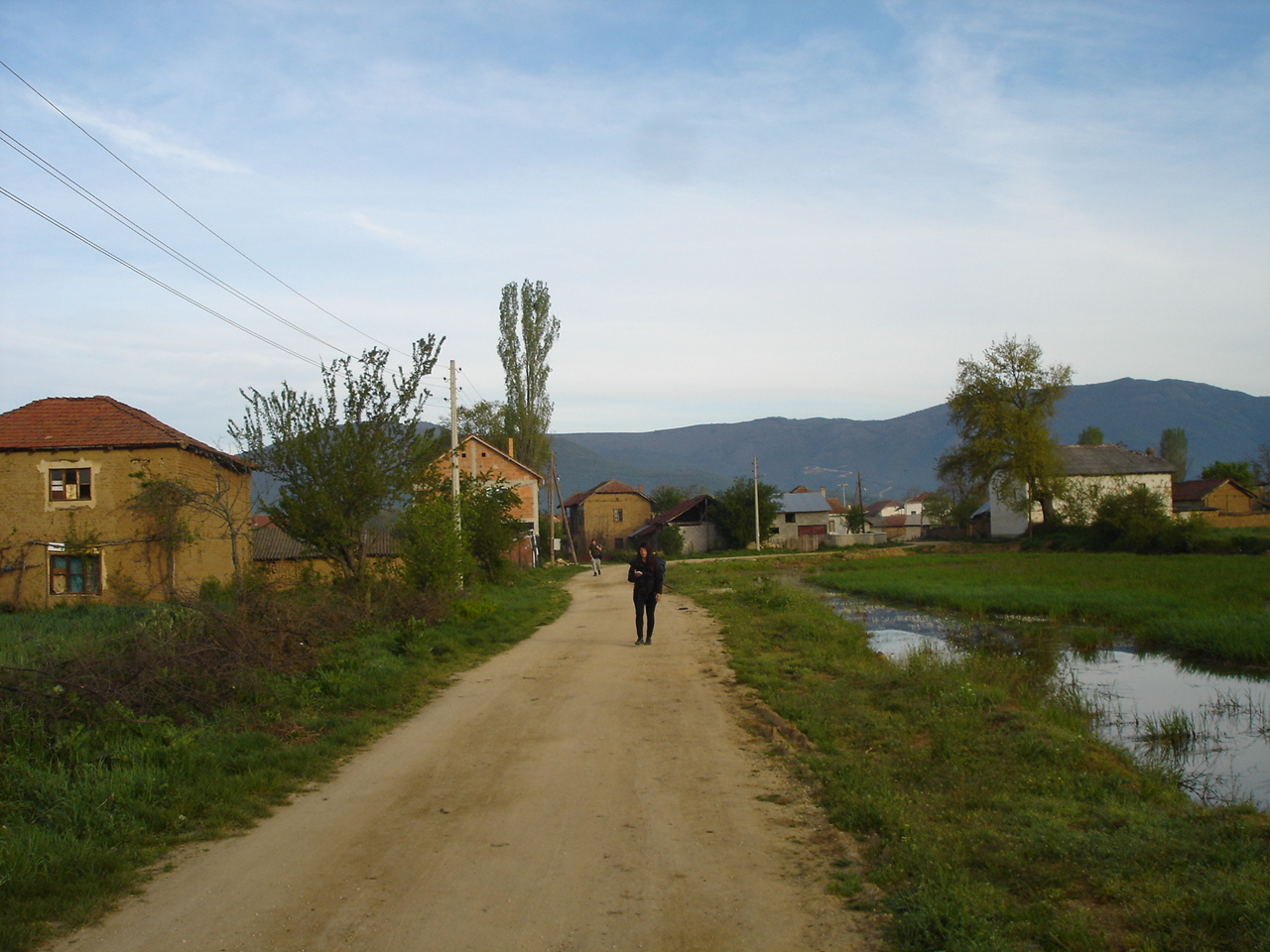

- Location within North Macedonia
- Country: North Macedonia
- Region: Pelagonia
- Municipality: Dolneni
- Elevation: 602 m (1,975 ft)

Population (2021)
  - Total: 258
- Time zone: UTC+1 (CET)
- Area code: +38948

Sekirci (Macedonian: Секирци) is a village in the municipality of Dolneni, North Macedonia.

== Demographics ==
According to the 2021 census, the village had a total of 258 inhabitants. Ethnic groups in the village include:

- Macedonians 247
- Persons for whom data are taken from administrative sources 11

Year	Macedonian	Albanian	Turks	Romani	Vlachs	Serbs	Bosniaks	Persons for whom data are taken from admin. sources	Total
2002	302	...	...	...	...	...	...	...	302
2021	247	...	...	...	...	...	...	11	258
