= Sherif Sulejmani =

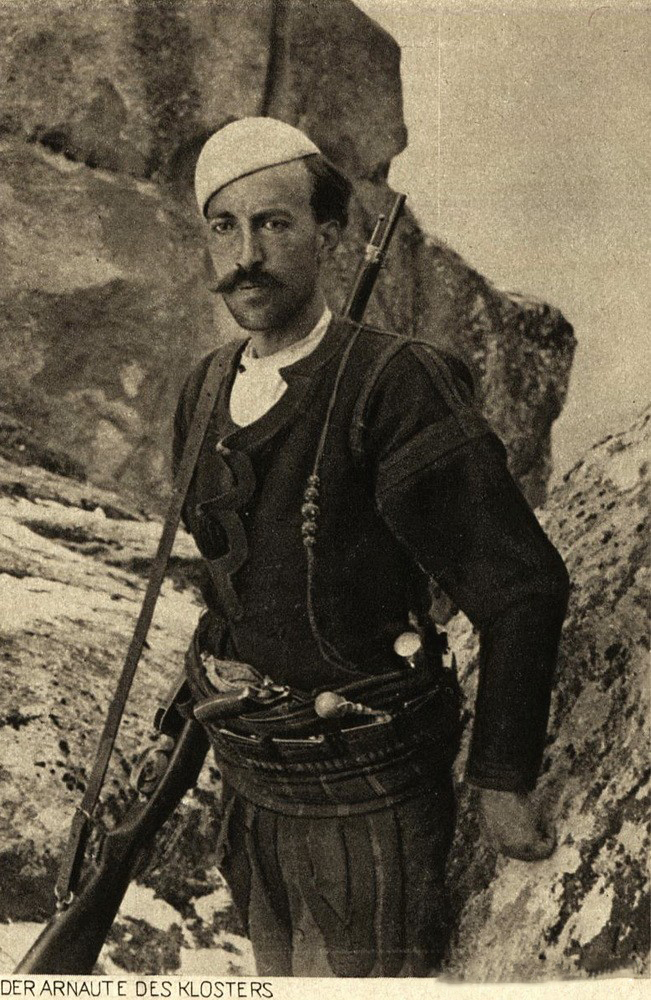
Sherif Sulejmani

Sherif Sulejmani was an Albanian revolutionary, and collaborator of the Internal Macedonian Revolutionary Organization.

== Biography ==
Sherif Suleiman was an Albanian from the village of Crnilište. He led his own armed detachment, which carried out tasks for the VMORO and directly for the voivode Petar Atsev . He was captured by the Ottoman authorities and sentenced to exile in the Bodrum Castle. He was amnestied in 1908 after the Young Turk Revolution. It is assumed that he was the physical perpetrator of the murder of Gligor Sokolović , as on July 29, 1910 he intercepted him on the road from Prilep to Nebregovo. In World War I, he again led his detachment and operated in the Prilep region in support of the Central Powers. In 1915, he participated in the massacre in Dolgaec and other villages in Prilep.

== Gallery ==
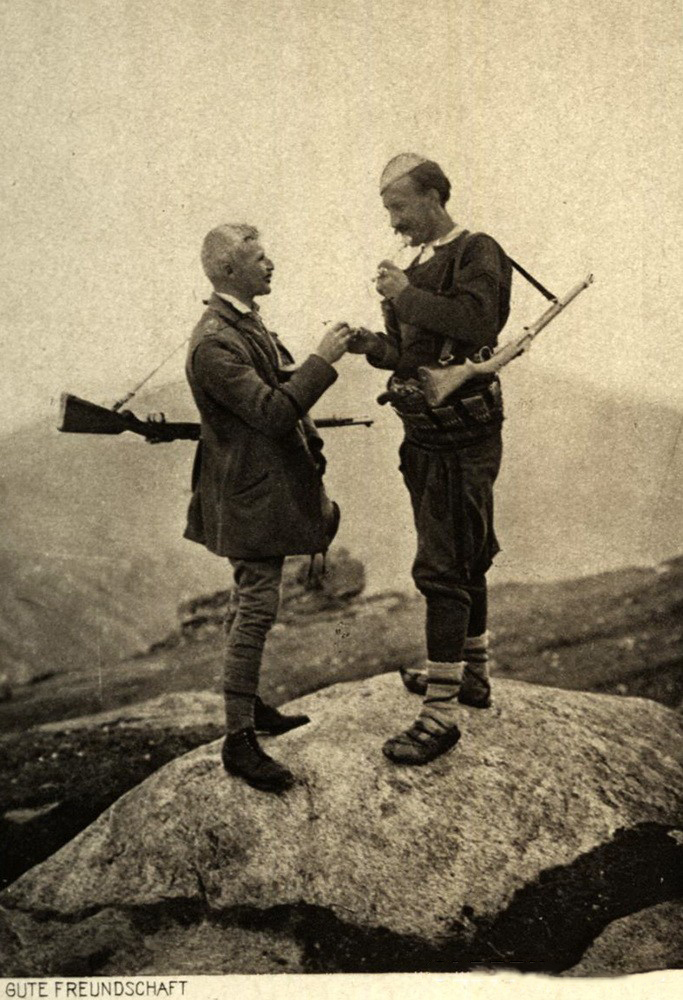
Sherif Sulejmani in a picture taken by Bajazid Doda

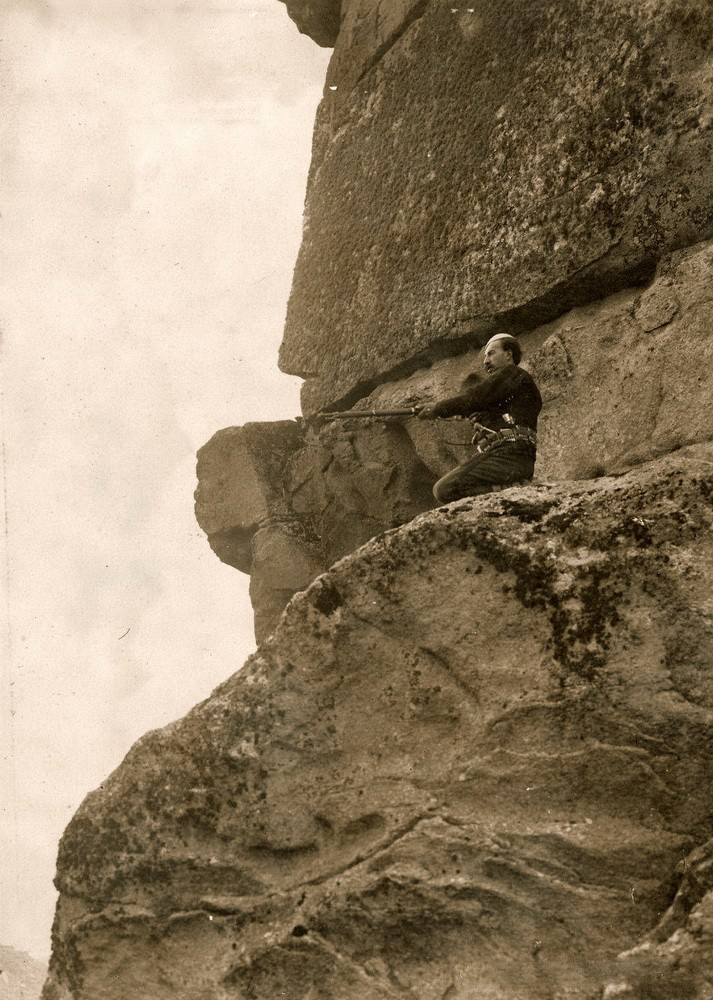
