= Žabjani =

Žabjani / Zhabjani Жабјани
- Village
- Location within North Macedonia
- Country: North Macedonia
- Region: Pelagonia
- Municipality: Dolneni
- Elevation: 559 m (1,834 ft)

Population (2021)
  - Total: 49
- Time zone: UTC+1 (CET)
- Area code: +38948

Zhabjani (Macedonian: Жабјани) is a village in the municipality of Dolneni, North Macedonia.

== Demographics ==
According to the 2021 census, the village had a total of 49 inhabitants. Ethnic groups in the village include:

- Macedonians 46
- Albanians 1
- Others 2

Year	Macedonian	Albanian	Serbs	Others	Total
2002	55	...	1	...	56
2021	46	1	...	2	49
