= Dolneni =

Dolneni Долнени
- Village
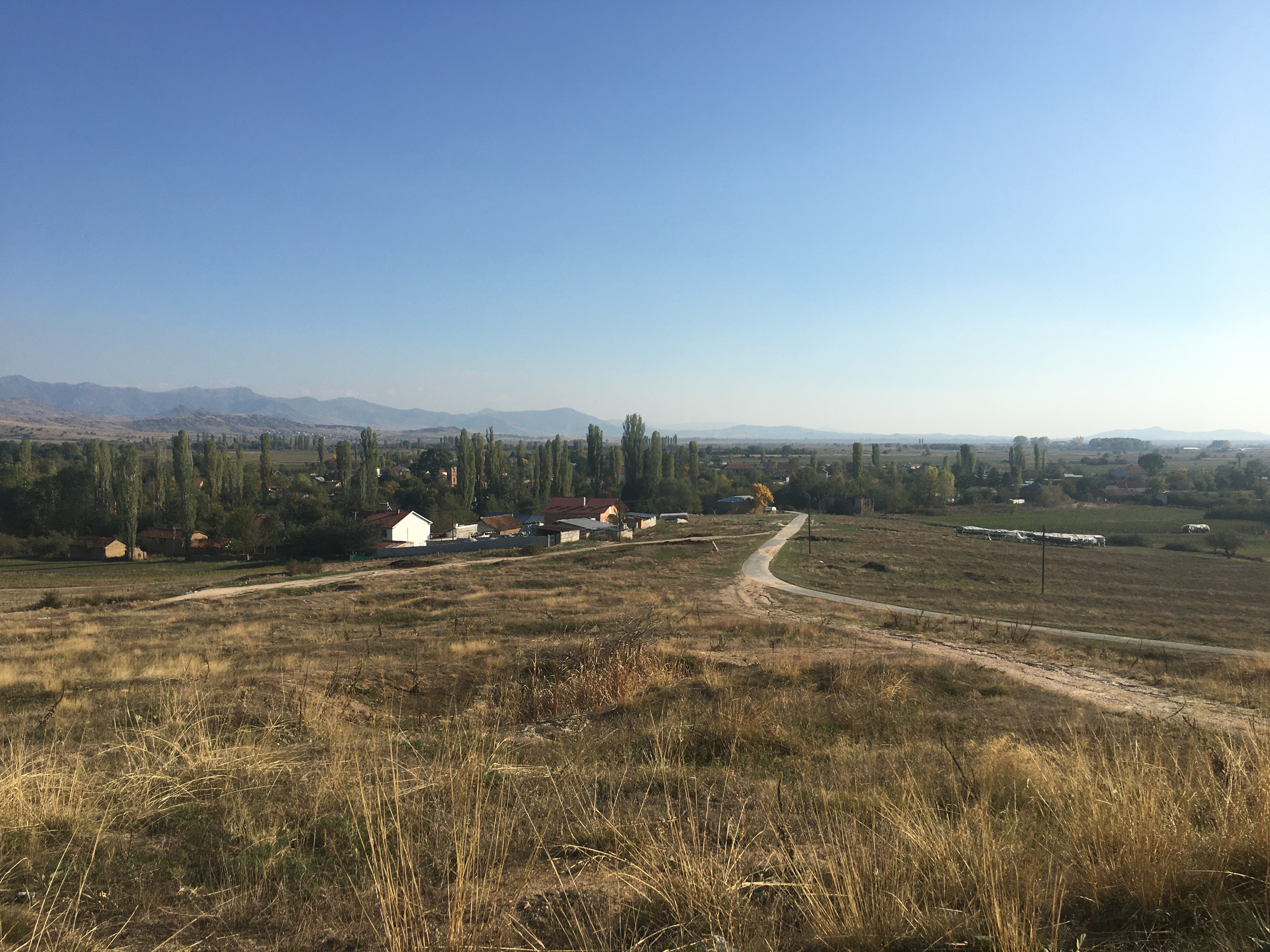

- Location within North Macedonia
- Coordinates: 41°25′31″N 21°27′16″E
- Country: North Macedonia
- Region: Pelagonia
- Municipality: Dolneni

Population (2021)
  - Total: 300
- Time zone: UTC+1 (CET)
  - Summer (DST): UTC+2 (CEST)
- Vehicle registration: PP

Dolneni (Macedonian: Долнени) is a village in the municipality of Dolneni, North Macedonia. It is located at the center of the plain of Prilepsko Pole (Prilep field), 10 km northwest of Prilep city and it is a seat of the Dolneni municipality.

It had 11,705 inhabitants in 1994.

== Demographics ==
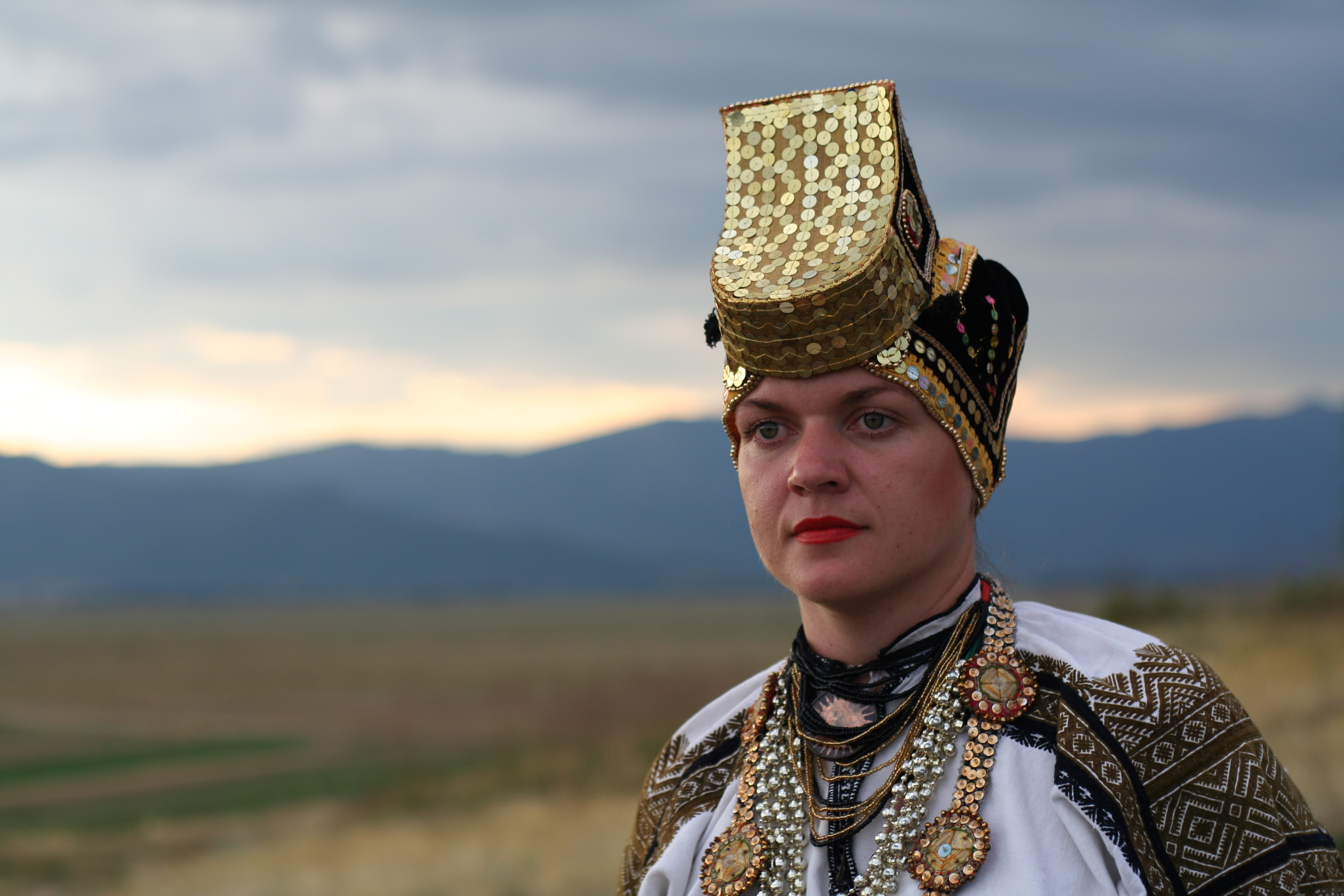
People of Dolneni in traditional costume

According to the 2021 census, the village had a total of 300 inhabitants. Ethnic groups in the village include:

- Macedonians 287
- People for whom data are taken from administrative sources 11
- Albanians 1
- Other 1

Year	Macedonian	Albanian	Turks	Romani	Vlachs	Serbs	Bosniaks	Others	Person for whom data are taken from admin. sources	Total
2002	374	...	...	...	...	...	...	1	n/a	375
2021	287	1	...	...	...	...	...	1	11	300
