= Slepče, Dolneni =

Slepče / Slepche Слепче
- Village
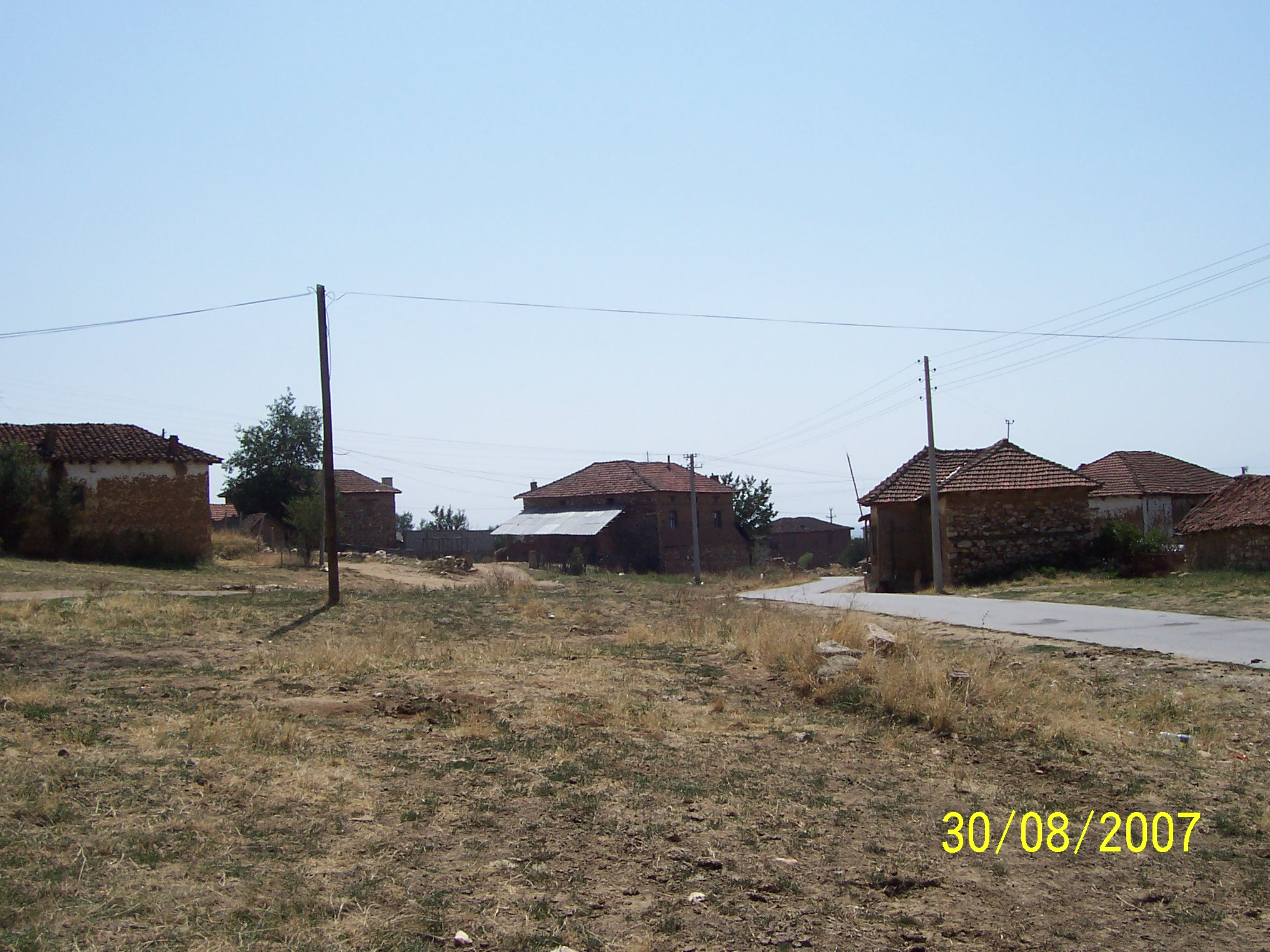

- Location within North Macedonia
- Country: North Macedonia
- Region: Pelagonia
- Municipality: Dolneni
- Elevation: 765 m (2,510 ft)

Population (2021)
  - Total: 34
- Time zone: UTC+1 (CET)
- Area code: +389484XXXXX

Slepche (Macedonian: Слепче) is a village in Municipality of Dolneni, central North Macedonia. Village is located on the northwestern part of Municipality of Dolneni.

== Demographics ==
As of 2021, the village has 34 inhabitants and the ethnic composition was the following:

- Macedonians - 24
- Vlachs - 6
- Persons for whom data are taken from administrative sources 4

Year	Macedonian	Albanian	Turks	Romani	Vlachs	Serbs	Bosniaks	Persons for whom data are taken from admin. sources	Total
2002	67	...	...	...	...	1	...	...	68
2021	24	...	...	...	6	...	...	4	34
