= Vranče =

Vranče / Vranche Вранче
- Village
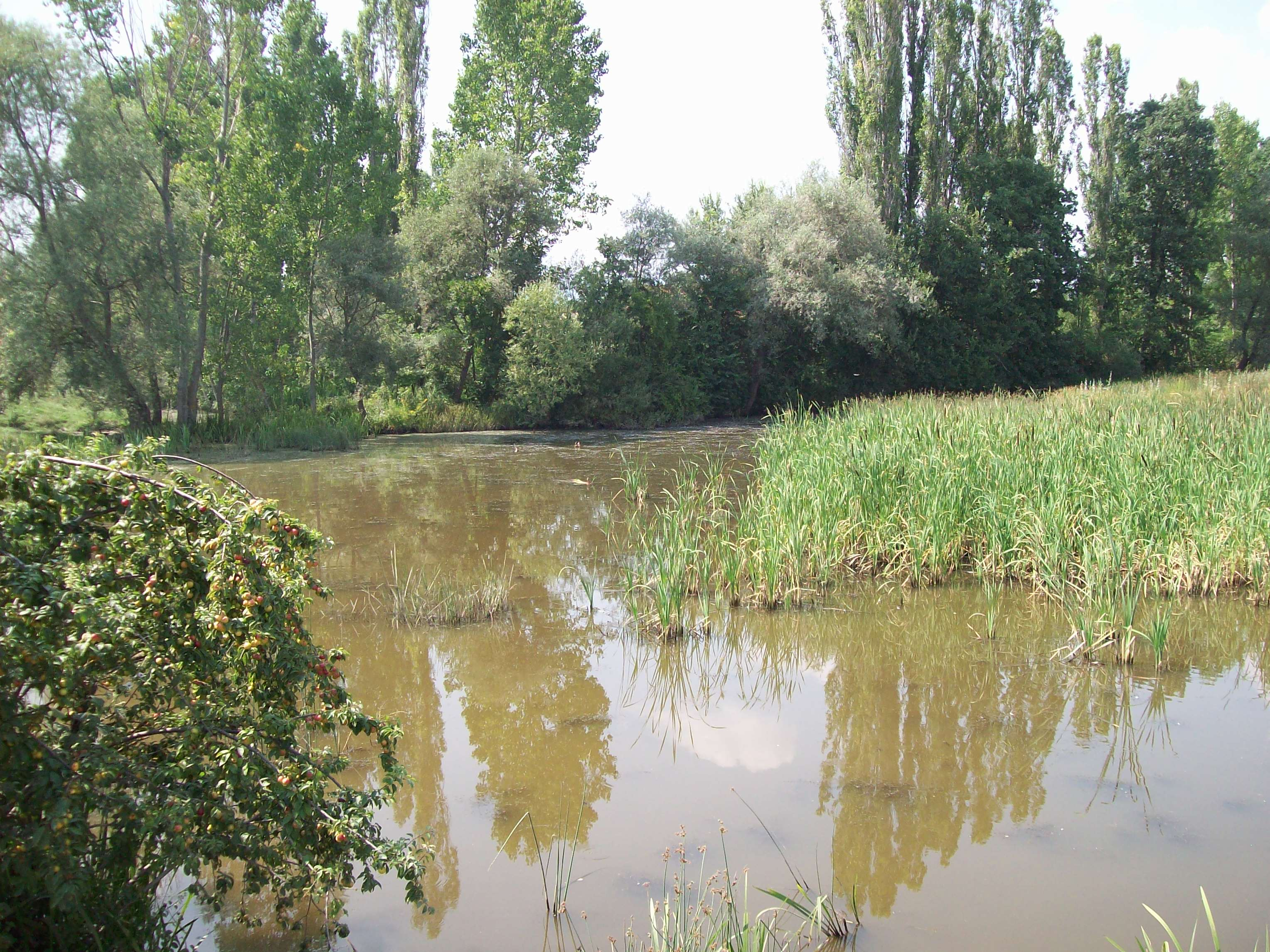
- Blato River

- Location within North Macedonia
- Country: North Macedonia
- Region: Pelagonia
- Municipality: Dolneni
- Elevation: 599 m (1,965 ft)

Population (2021)
  - Total: 84
- Time zone: UTC+1 (CET)
- Area code: +38948

Vranče (Macedonian: Вранче) is a village in the municipality of Dolneni, North Macedonia.

== Demographics ==
According to the 2021 census, the village had a total of 84 inhabitants. Ethnic groups in the village include:

- Macedonians 79
- Persons for whom data are taken from administrative sources 5

Year	Macedonian	Albanian	Turks	Romani	Vlachs	Serbs	Bosniaks	Persons for whom data are taken from admin. sources	Total
2002	105	...	...	...	...	...	...	...	105
2021	79	...	...	...	...	...	...	5	84
