= Lokveni =

Lokveni Локвени
- Village
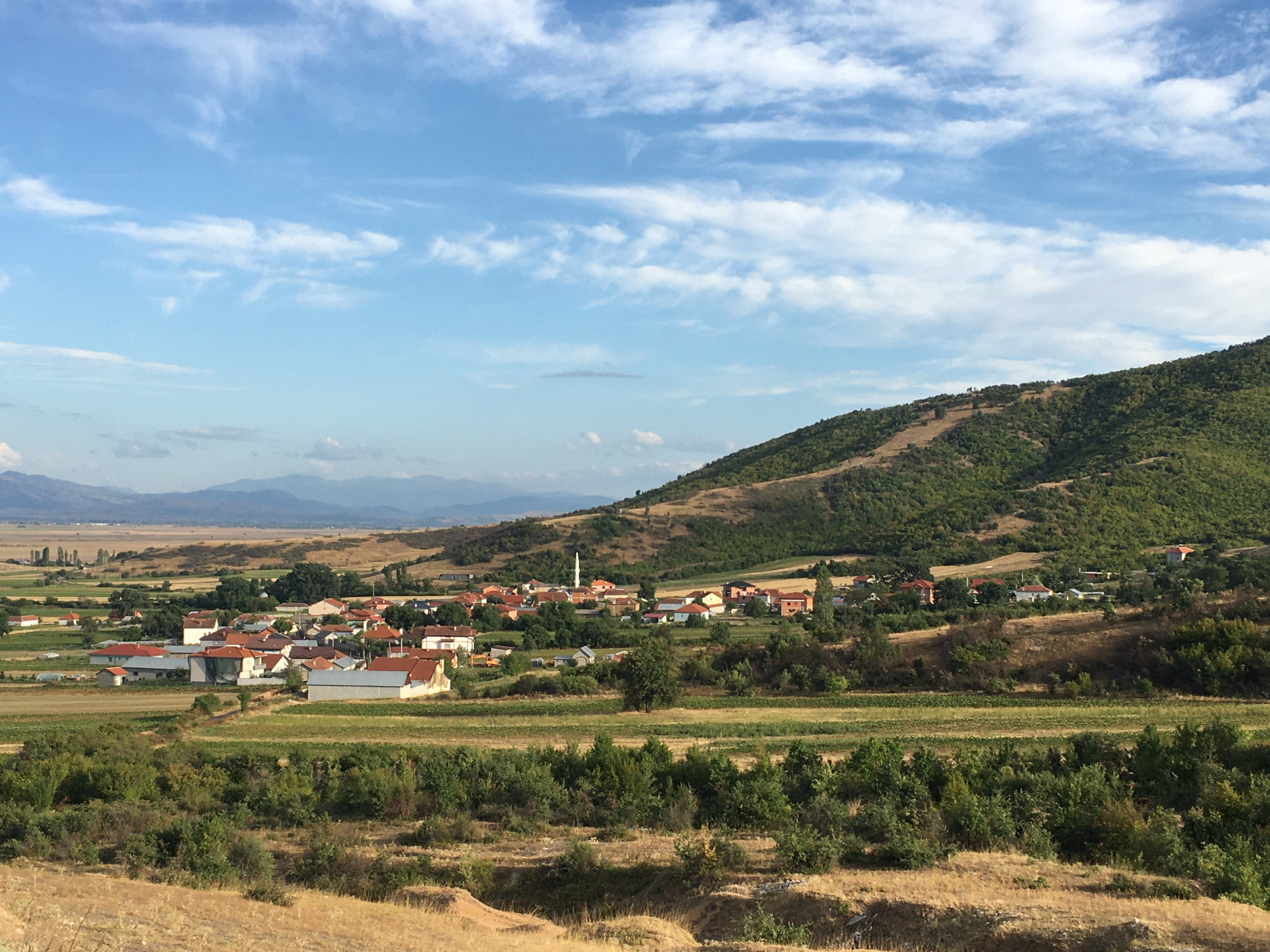
- View of the village

- Location within North Macedonia
- Country: North Macedonia
- Region: Pelagonia
- Municipality: Dolneni
- Elevation: 610 m (2,000 ft)

Population (2021)
  - Total: 144
- Time zone: UTC+1 (CET)
- Area code: +38948

Lokveni (Macedonian: Локвени) is a village in the municipality of Dolneni, North Macedonia. It used to be part of the former municipality of Žitoše.

== Demographics ==
According to the 2021 census, the village had a total of 144 inhabitants. Ethnic groups in the village include:

- Macedonians 11
- Albanians
- Turks 3
- Bosniaks 115
- Others 11

Year	Macedonian	Albanian	Turks	Romani	Vlachs	Serbs	Bosniaks	Others	Total
2002	28	...	...	6	...	...	143	1	178
2021	11	4	3	...	...	...	115	11	144
