= Desovo =

Desovo Десово Desovë
- Village
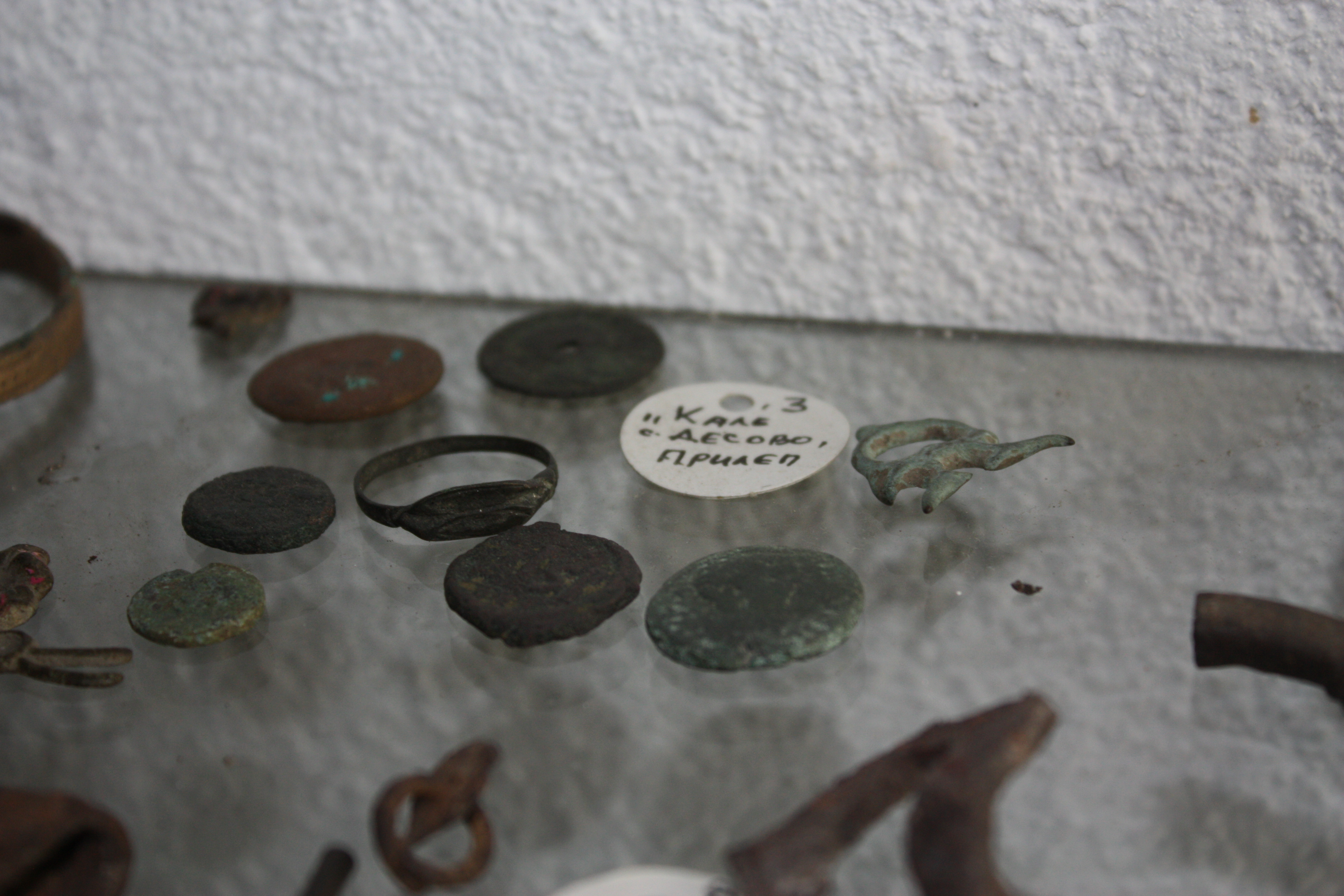
- Artefacts from Desovo

- Location within North Macedonia
- Coordinates: 41°27′45″N 21°29′28″E
- Country: North Macedonia
- Region: Pelagonia
- Municipality: Dolneni

Population (2021)
  - Total: 1,108
- Time zone: UTC+1 (CET)
  - Summer (DST): UTC+2 (CEST)
- Area code: +38948
- Car plates: PP
- Website: .

Desovo (Macedonian: Десово, Albanian: Desovë) is a village in the municipality of Dolneni, North Macedonia.

== History ==
The village of Desovo was a center of the Albanian Movement in the area. In September 1912, Serb majors M. Vasić and Vasilije Trbić, a Chetnik commander operating from Porečje region, gathered 30 Chetniks and travelled to the village of Desovo where they shot 111 Albanian men and razed the village. Desovo was once again razed in 1929 by Serb Chetnik bands active in the region. The event led to the first wave of migrations of Desovo Albanians mainly to Turkey, with some others going abroad to the United States and Australia. In 1948 Desovo numbered around 1,500 inhabitants mostly Albanians. Due to the sociopolitical pressures experienced within post war communist Yugoslavia under Aleksandar Ranković, between 1963 and 1968 most of the remaining Albanians in Desovo migrated to Turkey. In the 21st century, the village population is made up of Macedonians, Bosniaks and national Albanian sentiments among remaining Albanians have somewhat dissipated with assimilation being an issue. An Albanian school functions for the small Albanian community.

== Demographics ==
In statistics gathered by Vasil Kanchov in 1900, the village of Desovo was inhabited by 40 Bulgarian Christians, 75 Romani and 625 Muslim Albanians.

On the Ethnographic Map of the Bitola Vilayet of the Cartographic Institute in Sofia from 1901, Desovo appears as a mixed Bulgarian-Albanian-Turkish village in the Prilep kaza, having 128 houses.

According to the 2021 census, the village had a total of 1.108 inhabitants. Ethnic groups in the village include:

- Bosniaks 603
- Albanians 347
- Macedonians 76
- Turks 8
- Others 74

Year	Macedonian	Albanian	Turks	Romani	Vlachs	Serbs	Bosniaks	Others	Total
2002	145	290	20	...	...	3	566	2	1.026
2021	76	347	8	...	...	...	603	74	1.108
