= Ropotovo =

Ropotovo Ропотово
- Village
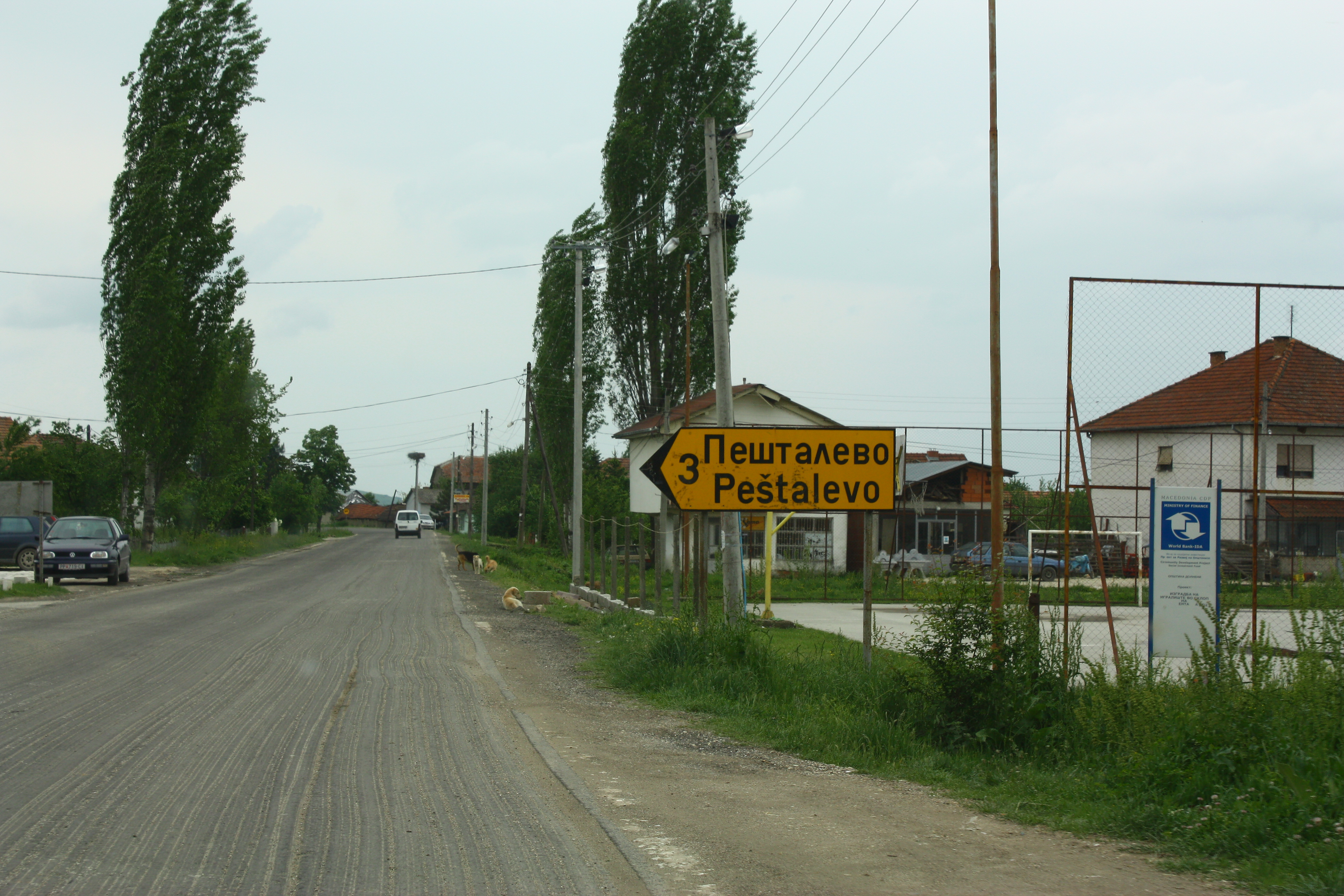

- Location within North Macedonia
- Country: North Macedonia
- Region: Pelagonia
- Municipality: Dolneni
- Elevation: 610 m (2,000 ft)

Population (2021)
  - Total: 516
- Time zone: UTC+1 (CET)
- Area code: +38948

Ropotovo (Macedonian: Ропотово) is a village in the municipality of Dolneni, North Macedonia.

== Demographics ==
Ropotovo appears in 15th century Ottoman defters as a village in the nahiyah of Köprülü. Among its inhabitants, a certain Nikolla Arbanas is recorded as a household head. The name Arbanas, is a medieval rendering for Albanian, indicating an Albanian presence in the village.

According to the 2021 census, the village had a total of 516 inhabitants. Ethnic groups in the village include:

- Macedonians 487
- Persons for whom data are taken from administrative sources 25
- Albanians 2
- Serbs 1
- Others 1

Year	Macedonian	Albanian	Turks	Romani	Vlachs	Serbs	Bosniaks	Others	Total
2002	545	...	...	...	...	1	...	...	546
2021	487	2	...	...	...	1	...	26	516
