= Sarandinovo =

Sarandinovo Сарандиново
- Village
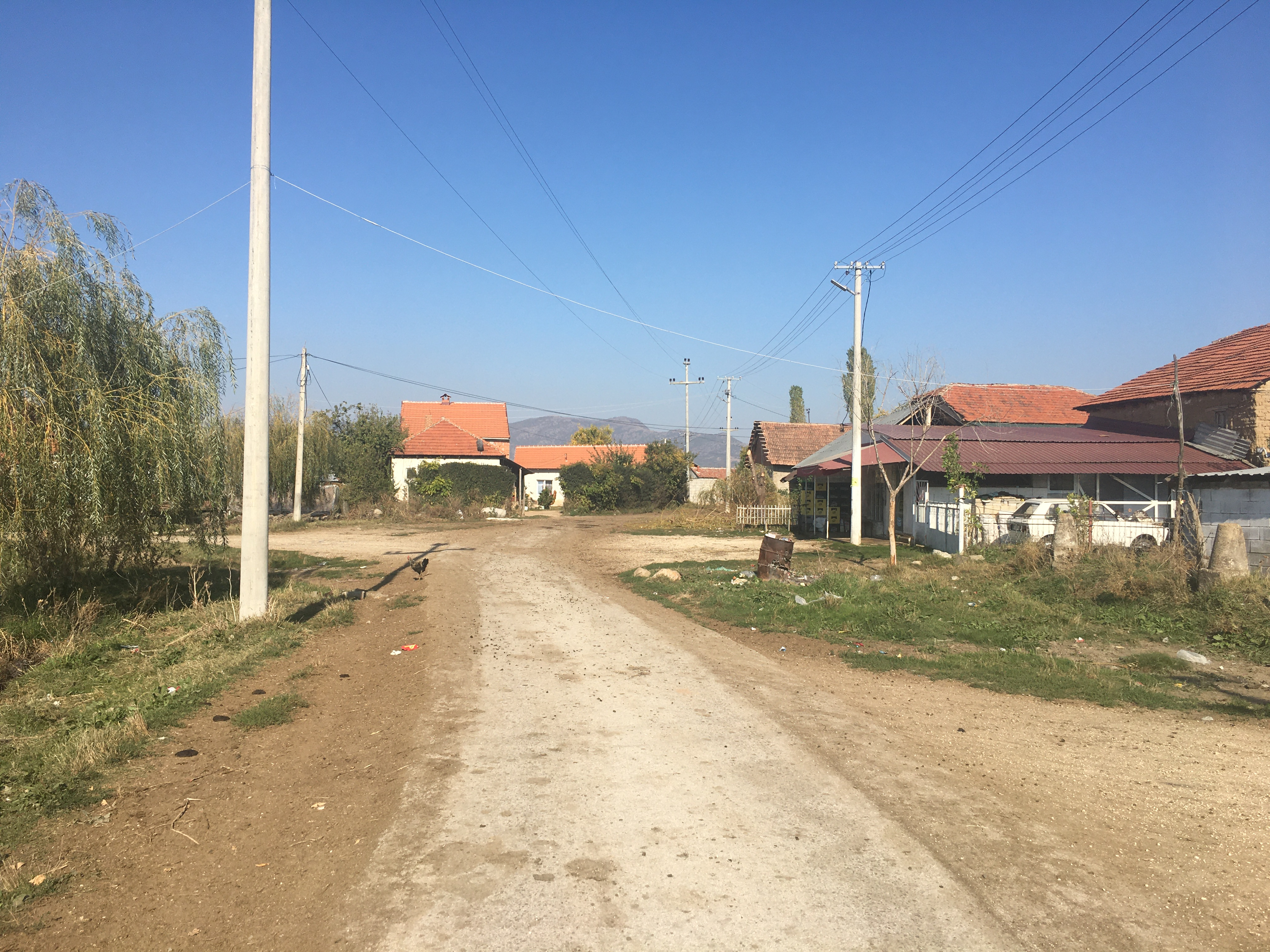
- View of road in Sarandinovo

- Location within North Macedonia
- Coordinates: 41°26′08″N 21°24′43″E
- Country: North Macedonia
- Region: Pelagonia
- Municipality: Dolneni
- Elevation: 595 m (1,952 ft)

Population (2021)
  - Total: 93
- Time zone: UTC+1 (CET)
- Area code: +38948

Sarandinovo (Macedonian: Сарандиново) is a village in the municipality of Dolneni, North Macedonia.

== Demographics ==
According to the 2021 census, the village had a total of 93 inhabitants. Ethnic groups in the village include:

- Macedonians 93

Year	Macedonian	Albanian	Turks	Romani	Vlachs	Serbs	Bosniaks	Others	Total
2002	98	...	...	...	...	...	...	...	98
2021	93	...	...	...	...	...	...	...	93
