= Dolneni Airport =

Airport in Prilep, North Macedonia

Dolneni Airport Аеродром Долнени
- IATA: none; ICAO: none

Summary
- Airport type: Agriculture
- Serves: Prilep
- Location: Prilep, North Macedonia
- Elevation AMSL: 1,970 ft / 600 m
- Coordinates: 41°25′46″N 21°24′08″E

Map
- Location in North Macedonia

Dolneni Airport (Аеродром Долнени) is an airport in Prilep, North Macedonia.

== See also ==
- Dolneni
