= Gostiražni =

Gostiražni Гостиражни Gostirazhnë
- Village
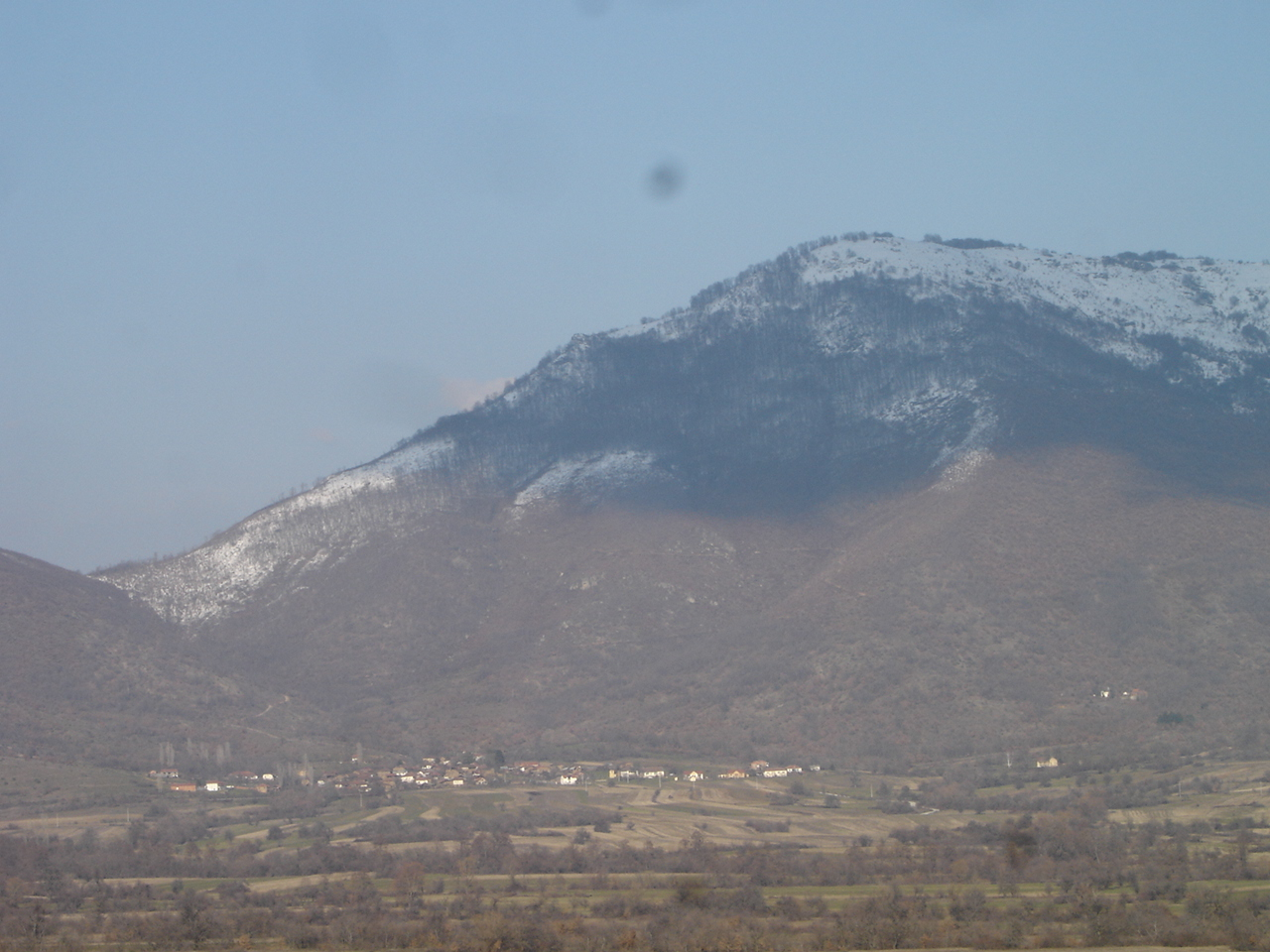
- Gostiražni

- Location within North Macedonia
- Coordinates: 41°33′15″N 21°25′50″E
- Country: North Macedonia
- Region: Pelagonia
- Municipality: Dolneni
- Elevation: 896 m (2,940 ft)

Population (2021)
  - Total: 135
- Time zone: UTC+1 (CET)
  - Summer (DST): UTC+2 (CEST)
- Area code: +38948
- Car plates: PP
- Website: .

Gostiražni (Macedonian: Гостиражни, Albanian: Gostirazhnë) is a village in the municipality of Dolneni, North Macedonia.

== Demographics ==
Gostiražni appears in 15th century Ottoman defters as a village in the nahiyah of Köprülü. Among its inhabitants, instances of household heads bearing Albanian anthroponyms, alongside the attribute Arnaut, a medieval Ottoman rendering for Albanians, are also present, such as: Gon Arnaud.

In statistics gathered by Vasil Kanchov in 1900, the village of Gostiražni was inhabited by 272 Bulgarian Christians.

According to the 2021 census, the village had a total of 135 inhabitants. Ethnic groups in the village include:

- Albanians 97
- Macedonians 31
- Serbs 1
- Others 6

Year	Macedonian	Albanian	Turks	Romani	Vlachs	Serbs	Bosniaks	Persons for whom data are taken from admin. sources	Total
2002	45	63	...	...	...	...	...	...	108
2021	31	97	...	...	...	1	...	6	135
