= Crnilište =

Crnilište Црнилиште Cërnilisht
- Village
- Location within North Macedonia
- Coordinates: 41°31′50″N 21°24′56″E
- Country: North Macedonia
- Region: Pelagonia
- Municipality: Dolneni

Population (2021)
  - Total: 1,937
- Time zone: UTC+1 (CET)
  - Summer (DST): UTC+2 (CEST)
- Area code: +38948
- Car plates: PP
- Website: .

Crnilište (Macedonian: Црнилиште, Albanian: Cërnilisht) is a village in the municipality of Dolneni, North Macedonia.

== Demographics ==
Crnilište appears in 15th century Ottoman defters as a village in the nahiyah of Köprülü. Among its inhabitants, a certain Dimitri Arnaud is recorded as a household head, bearing the attribute Arnaut, a medieval Ottoman rendering for Albanians.

In statistics gathered by Vasil Kanchov in 1900, the village of Crnilište (Tsernilišča) was inhabited by 60 Bulgarian Christians, 580 Albanian Muslims, and 80 Romanis.

On the Ethnographic Map of the Bitola Vilayet of the Cartographic Institute in Sofia from 1901, Crnilište appears as a mixed village of Bulgarians, Albanians and Turks in the Prilep Kaza of the Bitola Sandzak with 80 houses.

According to the 2021 census, the village had a total of 1,937 inhabitants. Ethnic groups in the village include:

- Albanians 1,894
- Macedonians 23
- Turks 2
- Others 18

Year	Macedonian	Albanian	Turks	Romani	Vlachs	Serbs	Bosniaks	Others	Total
2002	31	1,704	26	...	...	...	1	3	1,765
2021	23	1,894	2	...	...	...	...	18	1,937

== Notable people ==
- Ezgjan Alioski, footballer
- Sherif Sulejmani, Albanian voivode
