= Rilevo =

Rilevo Рилево
- Village
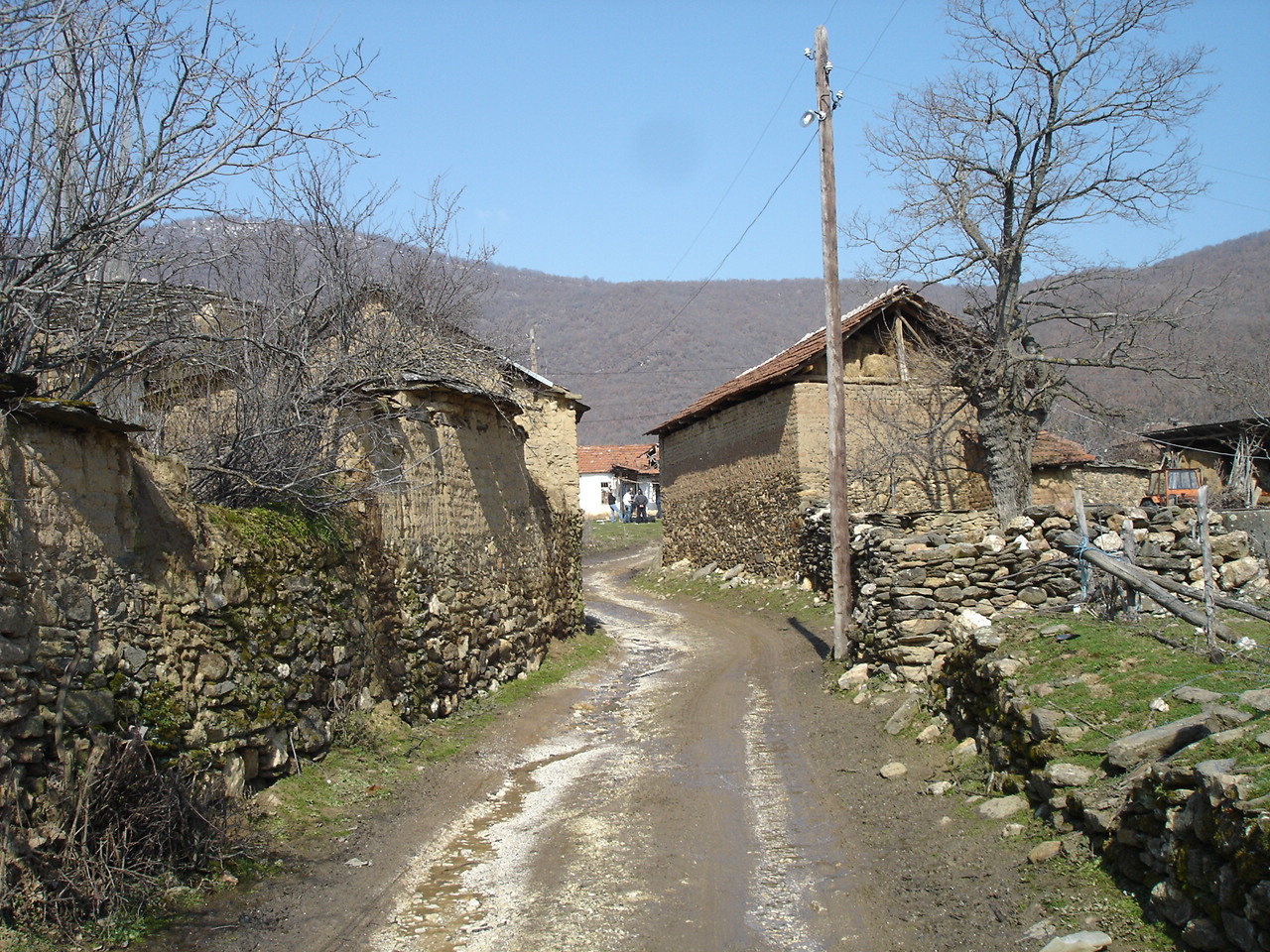

- Location within North Macedonia
- Country: North Macedonia
- Region: Pelagonia
- Municipality: Dolneni
- Elevation: 607 m (1,991 ft)

Population (2021)
  - Total: 48
- Time zone: UTC+1 (CET)
- Area code: +38948

Rilevo (Macedonian: Рилево) is a village in the municipality of Dolneni, North Macedonia.

== Demographics ==
According to the 2021 census, the village had a total of 48 inhabitants. Ethnic groups in the village include:

- Macedonians 46
- Albanians 1
- Others 1

Year	Macedonian	Albanian	Turks	Romani	Vlachs	Serbs	Bosniaks	Persons for whom data are taken from admin. sources	Total
2002	69	...	...	...	...	...	...	...	69
2021	46	1	...	...	...	...	...	1	48
