= Drenovci, Dolneni =

Drenovci Дреновци
- Village
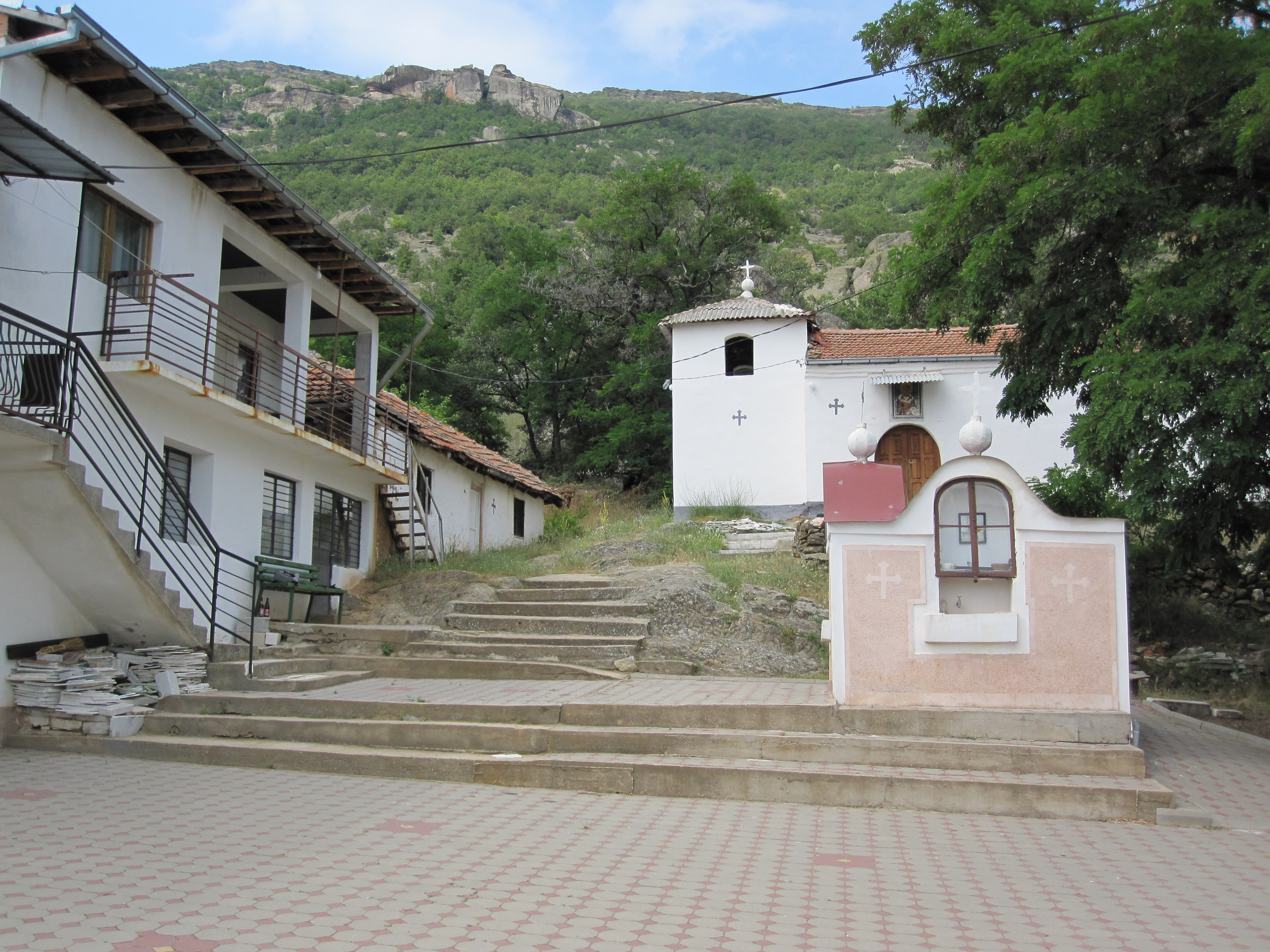
- Drenovci's monastery of St. Athanasius the Great

- Location within North Macedonia
- Country: North Macedonia
- Region: Pelagonia
- Municipality: Dolneni
- Elevation: 732 m (2,402 ft)

Population (2021)
  - Total: 235
- Time zone: UTC+1 (CET)
- Area code: +38948

Drenovci (Macedonian: Дреновци) is a village in the municipality of Dolneni, North Macedonia.

== Demographics ==
According to the 2021 census, the village had a total of 235 inhabitants. Ethnic groups in the village include:

- Macedonians 222
- Albanians
- Others 10

Year	Macedonian	Albanian	Turks	Romani	Vlachs	Serbs	Bosniaks	Persons for whom data are taken from admin. sources	Total
2002	231	...	...	...	...	...	...	...	231
2021	222	3	...	...	...	...	...	10	235
