= Kutleševo =

Kutleševo / Kutleshevo Кутлешево
- Village
- Location within North Macedonia
- Country: North Macedonia
- Region: Pelagonia
- Municipality: Dolneni
- Elevation: 662 m (2,172 ft)

Population (2021)
  - Total: 25
- Time zone: UTC+1 (CET)
- Area code: +38948

Kutleshevo (Macedonian: Кутлешево) is a village in the municipality of Dolneni, North Macedonia.

== Demographics ==
Kutleševo appears in the 1467-68 Ottoman defter. The register displayed a mixed Slavic-Albanian anthroponymy, with instances of individuals bearing both Slavic and Albanian names. The names are: Dimitri Arbanas, Dimitri son of Niko, Milush, son of Niko, Rela brother of Niko, Niko son of Kologjer, Dimitri Shahin..

According to the 2021 census, the village had a total of 25 inhabitants. Ethnic groups in the village include:

- Macedonians 25

Year	Macedonian	Albanian	Turks	Romani	Vlachs	Serbs	Bosniaks	Others	Total
2002	26	...	...	...	...	1	...	...	27
2021	25	...	...	...	...	...	...	...	25
