= Strovija =

Strovija Стровија
- Village
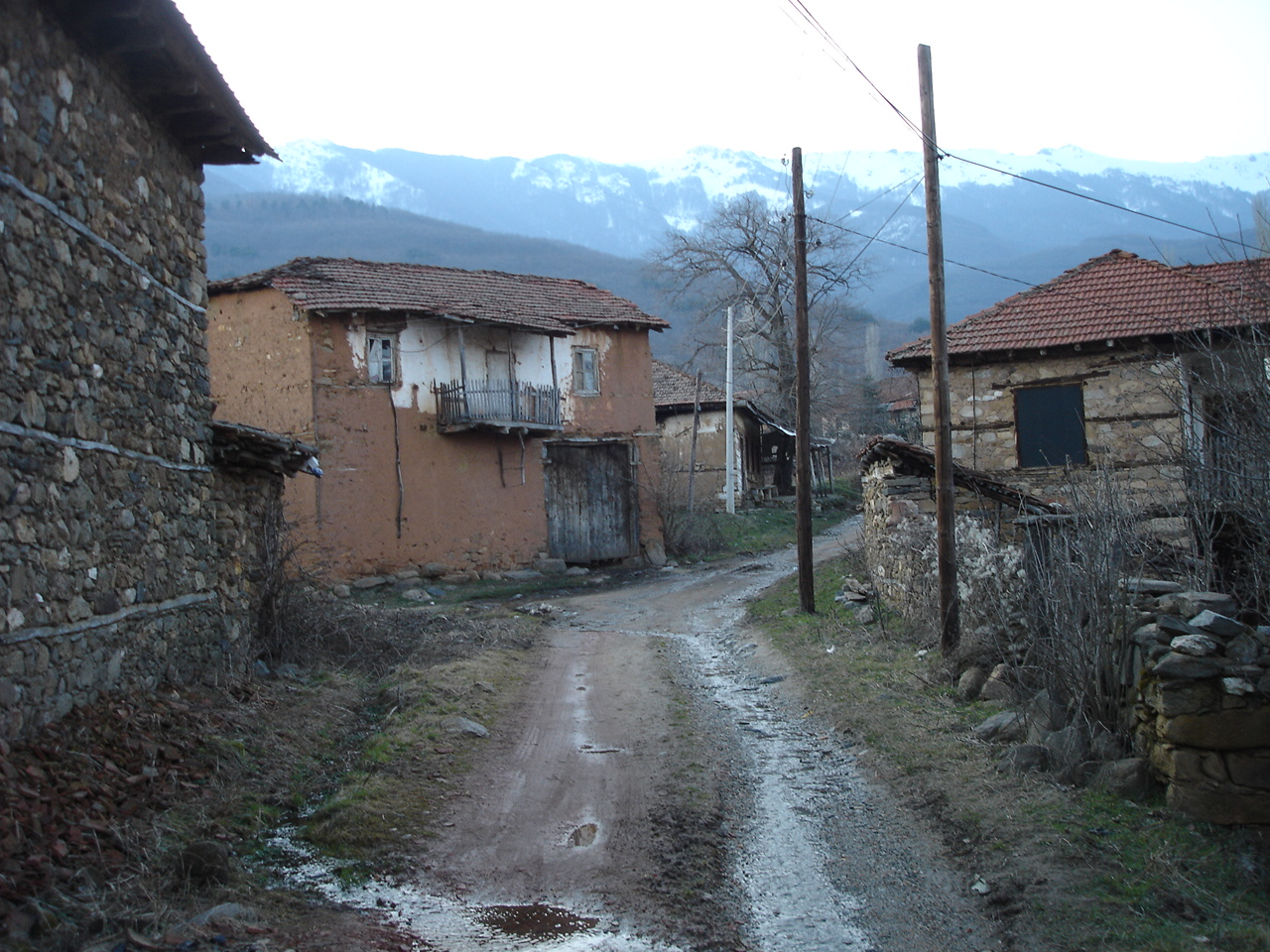

- Location within North Macedonia
- Country: North Macedonia
- Region: Pelagonia
- Municipality: Dolneni
- Elevation: 740 m (2,430 ft)

Population (2021)
  - Total: 24
- Time zone: UTC+1 (CET)
- Area code: +38948

Strovija (Macedonian: Стровија) is a village in the municipality of Dolneni, North Macedonia.

== Demographics ==
According to the 2021 census, the village had a total of 24 inhabitants. Ethnic groups in the village include:

- Macedonians 18
- Serbs 6

Year	Macedonian	Albanian	Turks	Romani	Vlachs	Serbs	Bosniaks	Others	Total
2002	35	...	...	...	...	...	...	...	35
2021	18	...	...	...	...	6	...	...	24
