= Vasilije Trbić =

vojvoda Vasilije Trbić
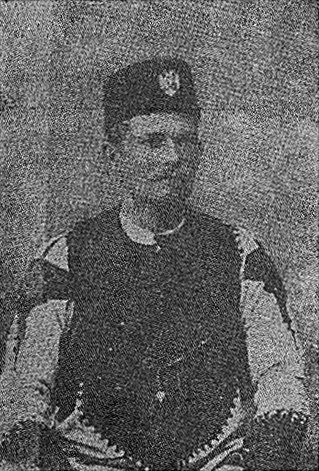
- Vasilije Trbić, c. 1904–1908
- Native name: Василије Трбић
- Nickname: Vasa Hilandarac
- Born: 1881; Bijelo Brdo, Kingdom of Croatia-Slavonia, Austria-Hungary
- Died: 1962 (aged 81)
- Allegiance: Chetnik Organization (1902–18); Kingdom of Serbia (1912–1918)
- Service years: 1902–1918
- Rank: vojvoda
- Commands: Chetnik Detachments in Macedonia
- Conflicts: Macedonian Struggle; Balkan Wars; World War I: Serbian Front; Salonika front
- Awards: Order of the Star of Karađorđe

Vasilije Trbić (Serbian Cyrillic: Василије Трбић; 1881 – 1962) was a Serbian Chetnik commander in Macedonia who became a politician in the Kingdom of Serbs, Croats and Slovenes, first representing the People's Radical Party (NRS) in the country's National Assembly and later the Yugoslav National Party (JNP). Born in the village of Bijelo Brdo, near Dalj in Austria-Hungary, Trbić was a monk in his youth. He fled Mount Athos after being accused of murdering several rogue monks and joined the nationalist Drimkolski's band in 1904–05, quickly becoming the unit's commander. Trbić fought alongside Serbian forces during the Balkan Wars and World War I, earning the Order of the Star of Karađorđe for his efforts. Acting alongside other former Chetnik commanders, he participated in establishing organizations whose purpose was to raise monuments to Serbian military successes from 1912–18 and to promote cultural development in Macedonia in the interwar period. He died in 1962.

== Early life ==
Vasilije Trbić was born in 1881 in the Slavonian village of Bijelo Brdo, near Dalj. He completed his early schooling here before continuing his education in the Kingdom of Serbia. A monk in his youth, Trbić was forced to flee Mount Athos in 1902 after being charged with murdering several Greek monks. He found sanctuary in Belgrade, where he met several Serbian nationalist leaders who convinced him to join their Chetnik bands. In 1903, Trbić murdered a Turk near the Pčinja River. He was caught and sentenced to death by Ottoman Turkish authorities before being pardoned for his crime.

== Involvement with the Chetniks ==
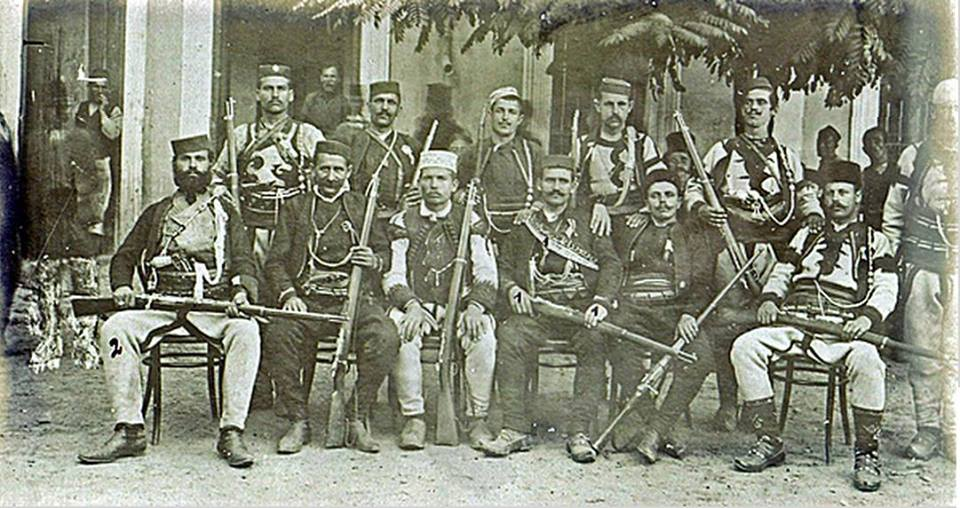
Trbić (in white clothing) with fellow Chetnik commanders, 1908.

In 1904–05, Trbić joined a Chetnik band in a Macedonian village in Drimkol and replaced vojvoda Đorđe Cvetković-Drimkolski as the unit's commander. Soon afterwards, he had one of his men executed for lack of discipline. This incident brought him into conflict with other Chetnik leaders in the area, notably vojvoda Andjelko Krstić. In 1907, Trbić was promoted to the rank of vojvoda in the city of Veles. Bloody skirmishes near the village of Nebregovo followed, involving Trbić's Chetniks and local Bulgarian insurgents. In 1907, Trbić and fellow vojvoda Jovan Babunski joined forces to defeat the forces of Bulgarian warlord Stefan Dimitrov in the village of Drenovo.

During the Balkan Wars, his Chetnik band launched several diversionary attacks against Turkish forces in Macedonia on behalf of the Serbian Army. As the war progressed, his Chetniks became one of the first Serbian units to enter the towns of Veles and Prilep in November 1912. Trbić flew an airplane past German, Austro-Hungarian, and Bulgarian lines and carried out reconnaissance missions for the Serbian Army after consulting with the intelligence officer Major Milan Vasić. He was awarded the Order of the Star of Karađorđe for his efforts.

In September 1912, Vasilije Trbić entered the village of Desovo with 30 Chetniks where they massacred 111 Albanian men and burned the village. In nearby Brailovo, Trbić had 60 Albanians executed.

== World War II ==
According to Serbian historian Jovan Marjanović, Trbić was an envoy of General Dragoljub Mihailović in Istanbul during wartime.

== Political career ==
After the Great War, Trbić became involved in politics. In 1924, he was elected as a deputy representing the People's Radical Party (NRS) in the National Assembly of the Kingdom of Serbs, Croats and Slovenes. Afterwards, he changed allegiances and became a member of the Yugoslav National Party (JNP). Alongside other former Chetnik commanders, he also participated in establishing organizations whose purpose was to raise monuments to Serbian military successes from 1912–18 and to promote cultural development in Macedonia. Following the Yugoslav coup d'état in March 1941, Trbić was overtly antagonistic towards the political and military leaders of the Kingdom of Yugoslavia, whom he blamed for the Axis invasion of the country. As World War II progressed, Trbić's son, Milivoje, became a Chetnik commander and led Chetnik forces in the Poreče region. Trbić died in 1962.

== See also ==
- List of Chetnik voivodes
