= Sredorek Peak =

Mountain in Antarctica

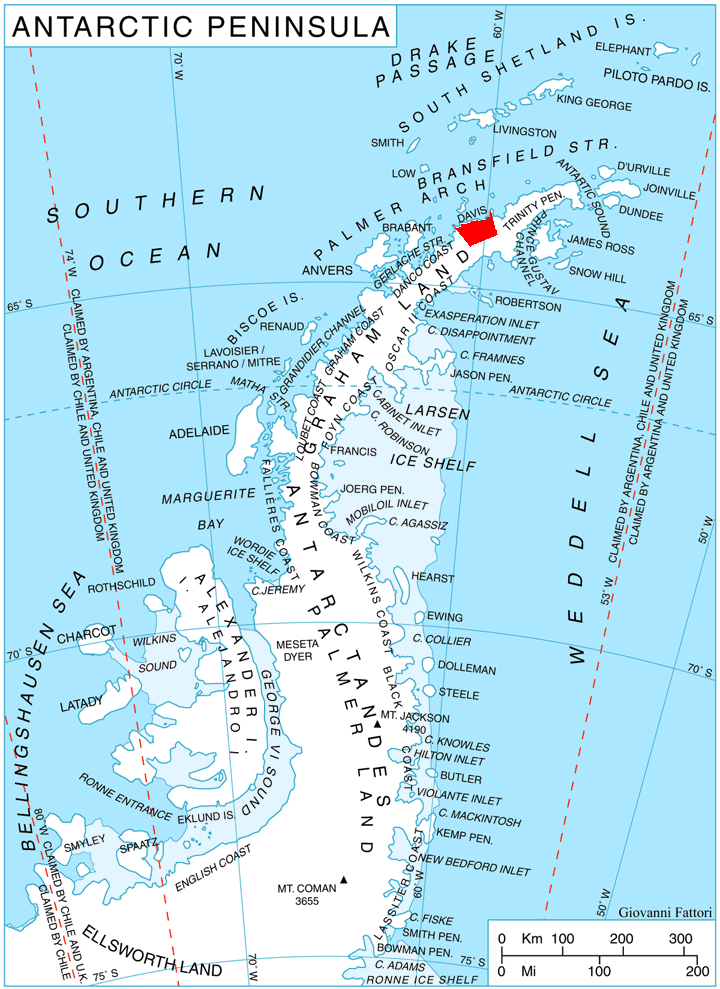
Location of Davis Coast on the Antarctic Peninsula.

Sredorek Peak (Bulgarian: връх Средорек, romanized: vrah Sredorek, IPA: [ˈvrɤx srɛdoˈrɛk]) is the peak rising to 1291 m in Korten Ridge east of Kasabova Glacier and west of Sabine Glacier on Davis Coast in Graham Land, Antarctica.

The peak is named after the settlements of Sredorek in eastern and western Bulgaria.

== Location ==
Sredorek Peak is located at 63°55′50″S 59°49′39″W, which is 6.1 km northeast of Chubra Peak, 1.85 km east-southeast of Chanute Peak and 5.25 km southwest of Velichkov Knoll. German-British mapping in 1996.

== Map ==
- Trinity Peninsula. Scale 1:250000 topographic map No. 5697. Institut für Angewandte Geodäsie and British Antarctic Survey, 1996.
