= Slivje, Dolneni =

Slivje Сливје
- Village
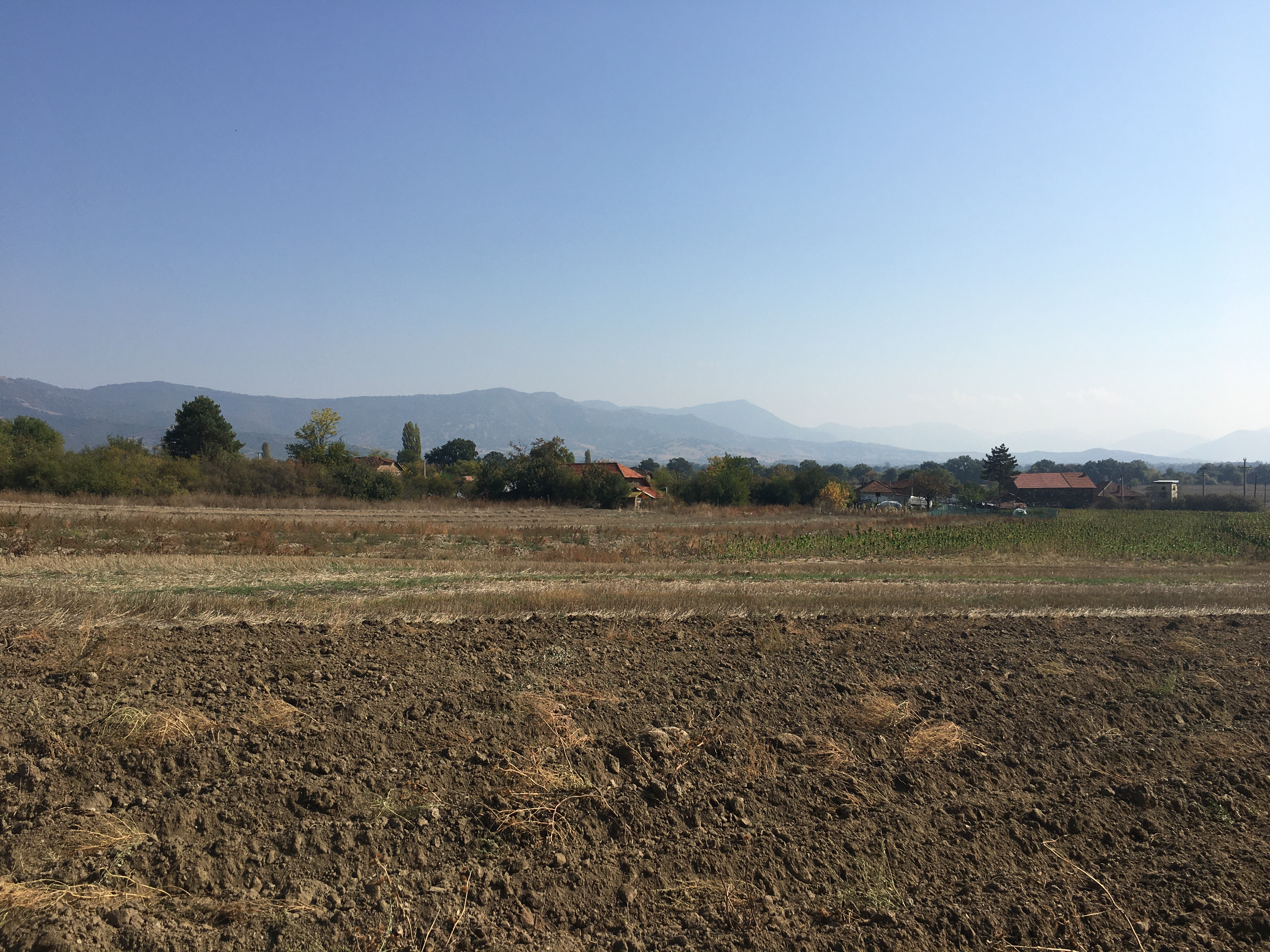

- Location within North Macedonia
- Country: North Macedonia
- Region: Pelagonia
- Municipality: Dolneni
- Elevation: 604 m (1,982 ft)

Population (2021)
  - Total: 23
- Time zone: UTC+1 (CET)
- Area code: +38948

Slivje (Macedonian: Сливје) is a village in the municipality of Dolneni, North Macedonia.

== Demographics ==
Slivje appears in the 1467-68 Ottoman defter. The register displayed a largely Slavic anthroponymy alongside mixed Slavic-Albanian anthroponymy, with instances of individuals bearing both Slavic and Albanian names. The names are: Pejo son of Gjergj, Ana son of Shulan, Nina son of Jako, Lazor son of Vunça, Andronik son of Dimitri, Jako son of Dimitri, Andreja son of Niko.

According to the 2021 census, the village had a total of 23 inhabitants. Ethnic groups in the village include:

- Macedonians 21
- Persons for whom data are taken from administrative sources 2

Year	Macedonian	Albanian	Turks	Romani	Vlachs	Serbs	Bosniaks	Persons for whom data are taken from admin. sources	Total
2002	35	...	...	...	...	...	...	...	35
2021	21	...	...	...	...	...	...	2	23
