= Novoselani, Dolneni =

Novoselani Новоселани
- Village
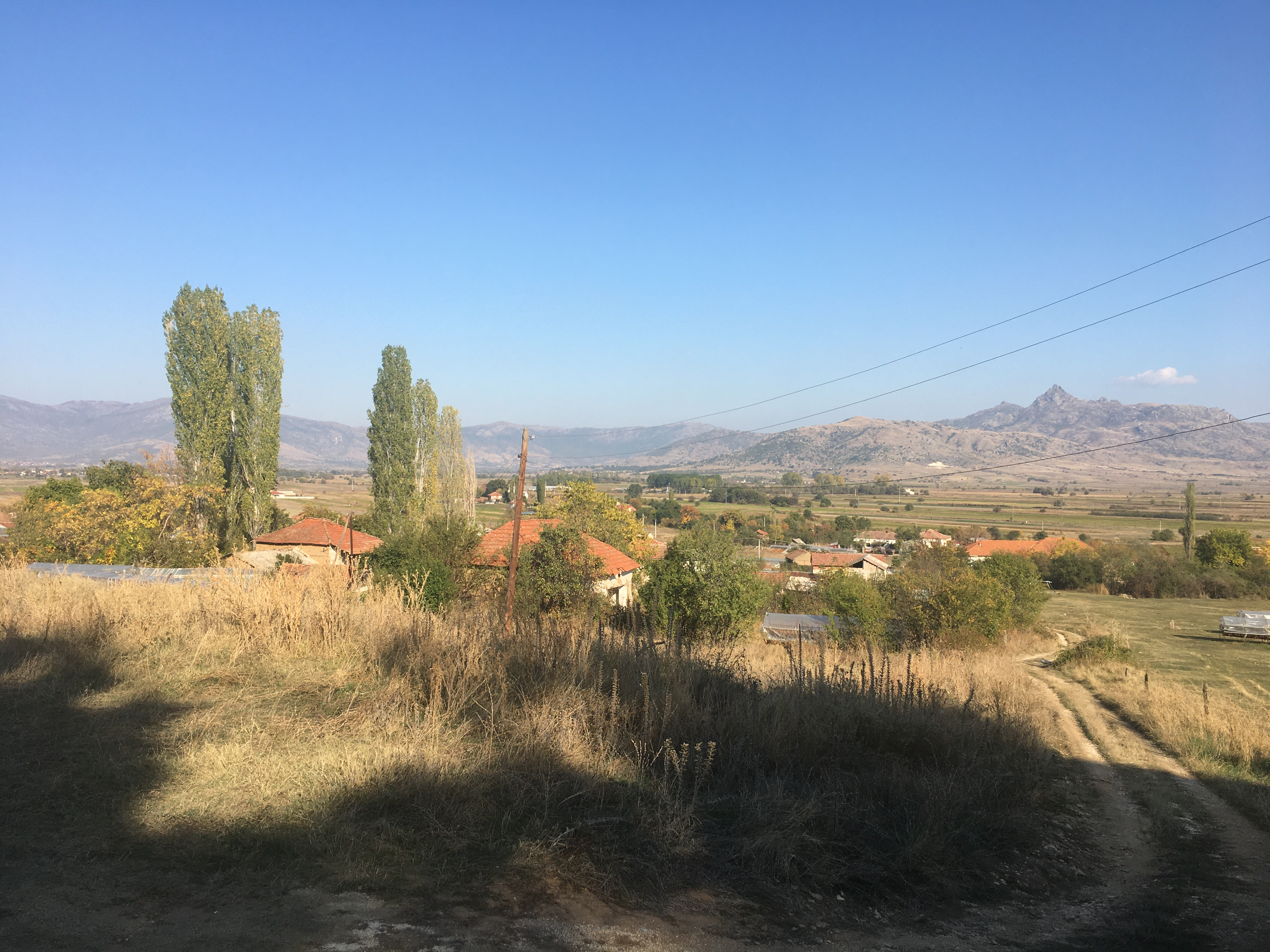

- Location within North Macedonia
- Country: North Macedonia
- Region: Pelagonia
- Municipality: Dolneni
- Elevation: 600 m (2,000 ft)

Population (2021)
  - Total: 94
- Time zone: UTC+1 (CET)
- Area code: +38948

Novoselani (Macedonian: Новоселани) is a village in the municipality of Dolneni, North Macedonia.

== Demographics ==
According to the 2021 census, the village had a total of 94 inhabitants. Ethnic groups in the village include:

- Macedonians 111

Year	Macedonian	Albanian	Turks	Romani	Vlachs	Serbs	Bosniaks	Persons for whom data are taken from admin. sources	Total
2002	111	...	...	...	...	...	...	...	111
2021	87	...	...	...	...	...	...	7	94
