= Dupjačani =

Dupjačani / Dupjachani Дупјачани
- Village
- Location within North Macedonia
- Country: North Macedonia
- Region: Pelagonia
- Municipality: Dolneni
- Elevation: 758 m (2,487 ft)

Population (2021)
  - Total: 127
- Time zone: UTC+1 (CET)
- Area code: +38948

Dupjachani (Macedonian: Дупјачани) is a village in the municipality of Dolneni, North Macedonia.

== Demographics ==
According to the 2021 census, the village had a total of 127 inhabitants. Ethnic groups in the village include:

- Macedonians 124
- Albanians 1
- Other 2

Year	Macedonian	Albanian	Turks	Romani	Vlachs	Serbs	Bosniaks	Others	Total
2002	154	...	...	...	...	...	...	1	155
2021	124	1	...	...	...	...	...	2	127
