= Sredorek, Dolneni =

Sredorek Средорек
- Village
- Location within North Macedonia
- Country: North Macedonia
- Region: Pelagonia
- Municipality: Dolneni
- Elevation: 604 m (1,982 ft)

Population (2021)
  - Total: 30
- Time zone: UTC+1 (CET)
- Area code: +38948

Sredorek (Macedonian: Средорек) is a village in the municipality of Dolneni, North Macedonia.

== Demographics ==
According to the 2021 census, the village had a total of 30 inhabitants. Ethnic groups in the village include:

- Macedonians 30

Year	Macedonian	Albanian	Turks	Romani	Vlachs	Serbs	Bosniaks	Others	Total
2002	52	...	...	...	...	...	...	...	52
2021	30	...	...	...	...	...	...	...	30
