= Malo Mramorani =

Malo Mramorani Мало Мраморани
- Village
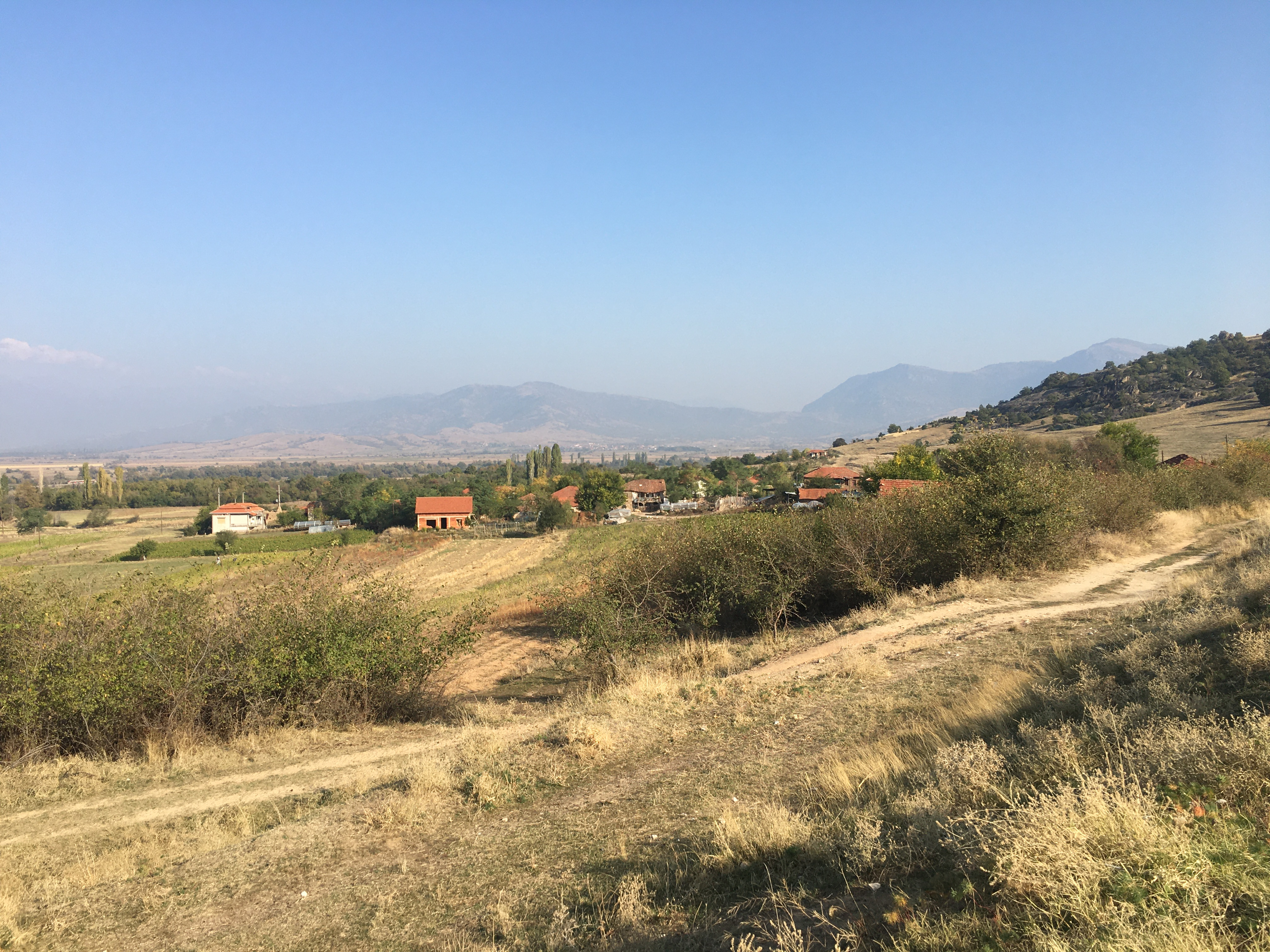

- Location within North Macedonia
- Country: North Macedonia
- Region: Pelagonia
- Municipality: Dolneni
- Elevation: 873 m (2,864 ft)

Population (2021)
  - Total: 46
- Time zone: UTC+1 (CET)
- Area code: +38948

Malo Mramorani (Macedonian: Мало Мраморани) is a village in the municipality of Dolneni, North Macedonia.

== Demographics ==
According to the 2021 census, the village had a total of 46 inhabitants. Ethnic groups in the village include:

- Macedonians 45
- Others 1

Year	Macedonian	Albanian	Turks	Romani	Vlachs	Serbs	Bosniaks	Persons for whom data are taken from admin. sources	Total
2002	44	...	...	...	...	...	...	...	44
2021	45	...	...	...	...	...	...	1	46
