= Dolgaec =

Dolgaec Долгаец
- Village
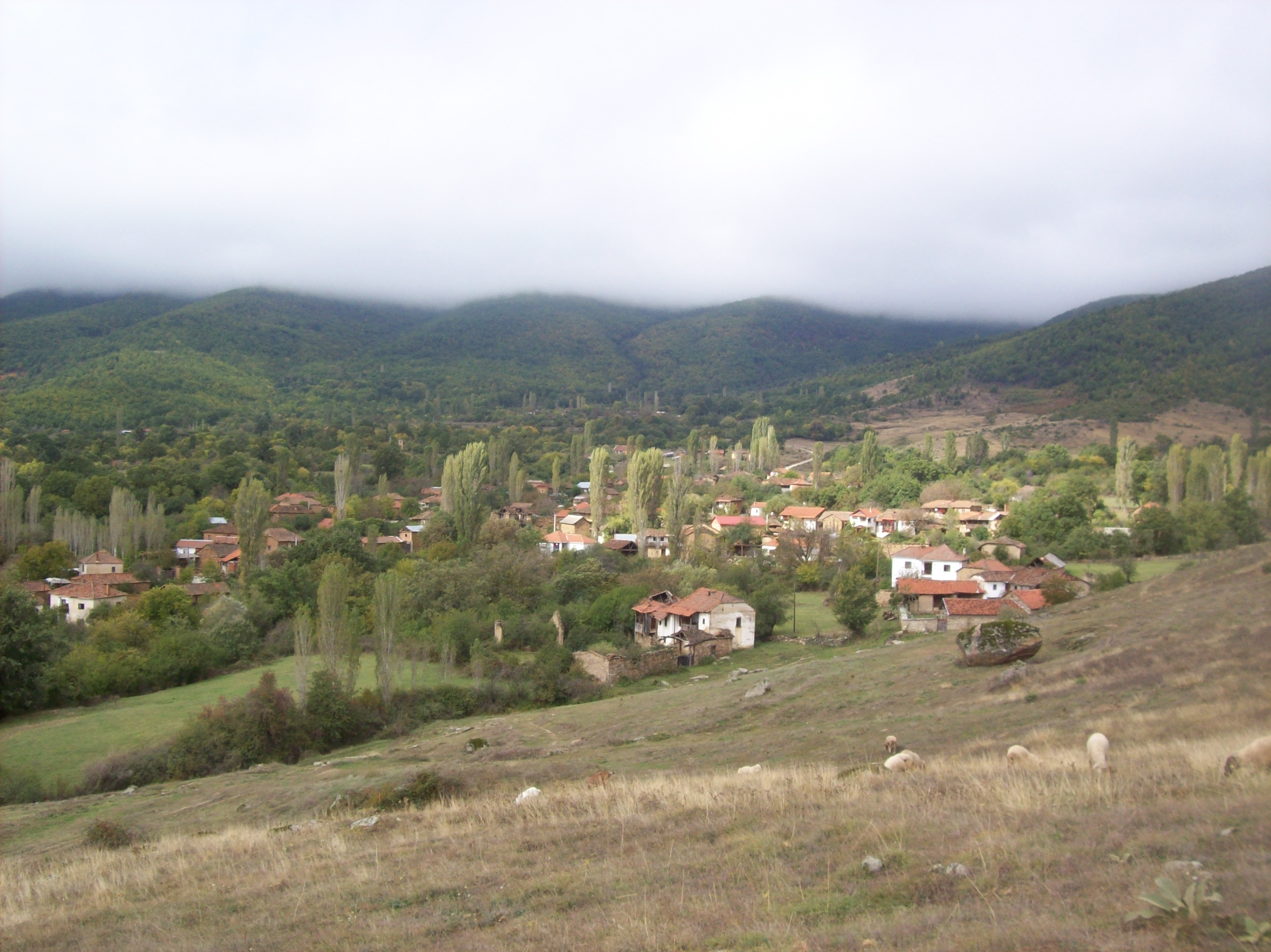

- Location within North Macedonia
- Country: North Macedonia
- Region: Pelagonia
- Municipality: Dolneni
- Elevation: 655 m (2,149 ft)

Population (2021)
  - Total: 41
- Time zone: UTC+1 (CET)
- Area code: +38948

Dolgaec (Macedonian: Долгаец) is a village in the municipality of Dolneni, North Macedonia.

== History ==
180 inhabitants of the village were massacred in the First World War by the Bulgarian Army.

== Demographics ==
According to the 2021 census, the village had a total of 41 inhabitants. Ethnic groups in the village include:

- Macedonians 39
- Others 2

Year	Macedonian	Albanian	Turks	Romani	Vlachs	Serbs	Bosniaks	Persons for whom data are taken from admin. sources	Total
2002	70	...	...	...	...	...	...	...	70
2021	39	...	...	...	...	...	...	2	41
