= Brailovo =

Brailovo Браилово
- Village
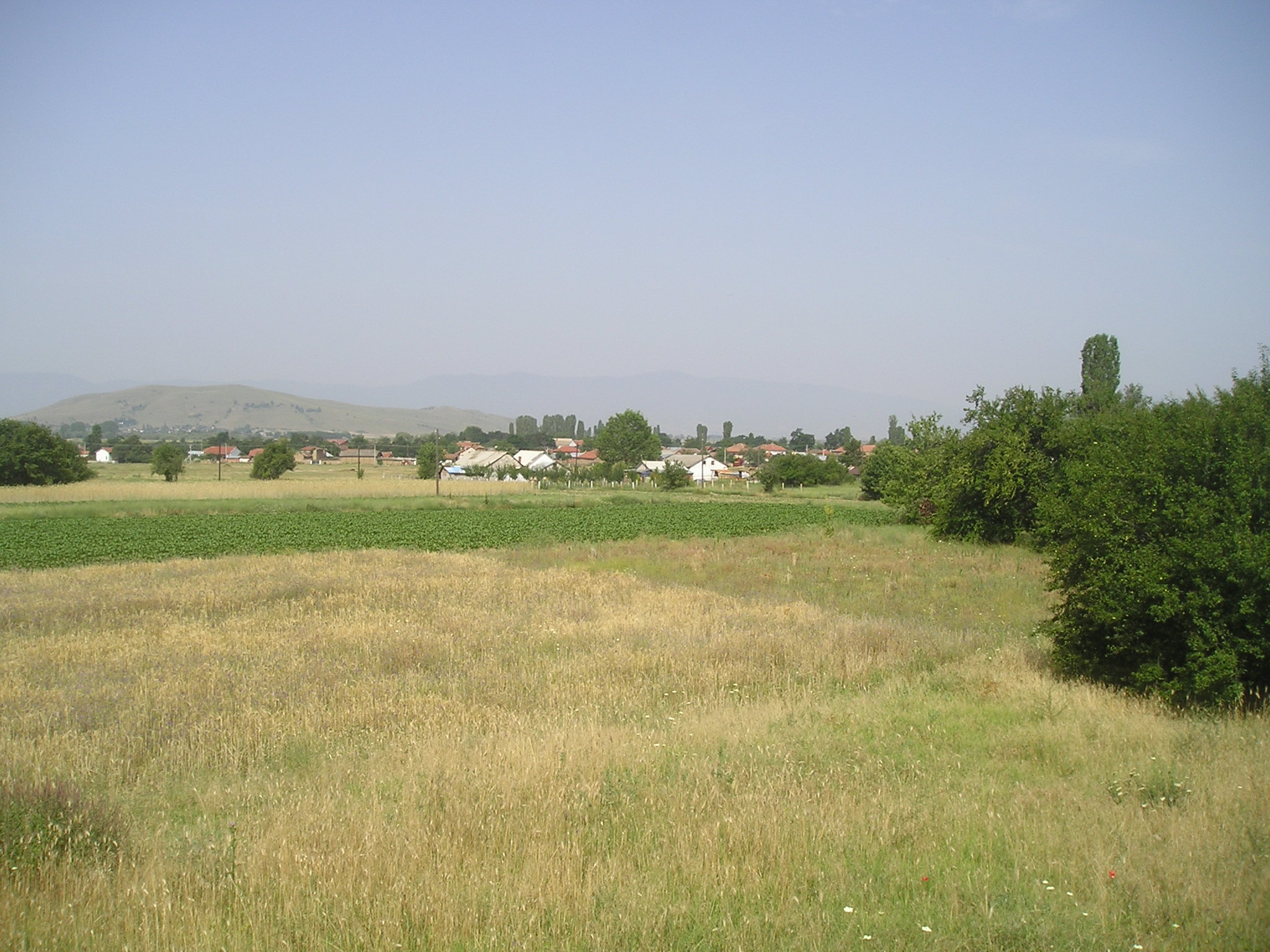

- Location within North Macedonia
- Country: North Macedonia
- Region: Pelagonia
- Municipality: Dolneni
- Elevation: 682 m (2,238 ft)

Population (2021)
  - Total: 186
- Time zone: UTC+1 (CET)
- Area code: +38948

Brailovo (Macedonian: Браилово) is a village in the municipality of Dolneni, North Macedonia.

== Demographics ==
According to statistics compiled by Vasil Kanchov in 1900, the village of Brailovo was inhabited by 250 Christian Bulgarians and 100 Muslim Albanians.

The Ethnographic Map of the Bitola Vilayet, prepared by the Cartographic Institute in Sofia in 1901, shows Brailovo as a mixed Bulgarian, Albanian, and Turkish village within the Prilep Kaza of the Bitola Sandjak, consisting of a total of 40 houses.

The 2021 census reported a total of 186 inhabitants in the village. The ethnic composition of the village includes:

- Macedonians 183
- Albanians 1
- Serbs 1
- Others 1

Year	Macedonian	Albanian	Turks	Romani	Vlachs	Serbs	Bosniaks	Persons for whom data are taken from admin. sources	Total
2002	225	...	...	...	...	2	...	...	227
2021	183	1	...	...	...	1	...	1	186
