= Senokos, Dolneni =

Senokos Сенокос
- Village
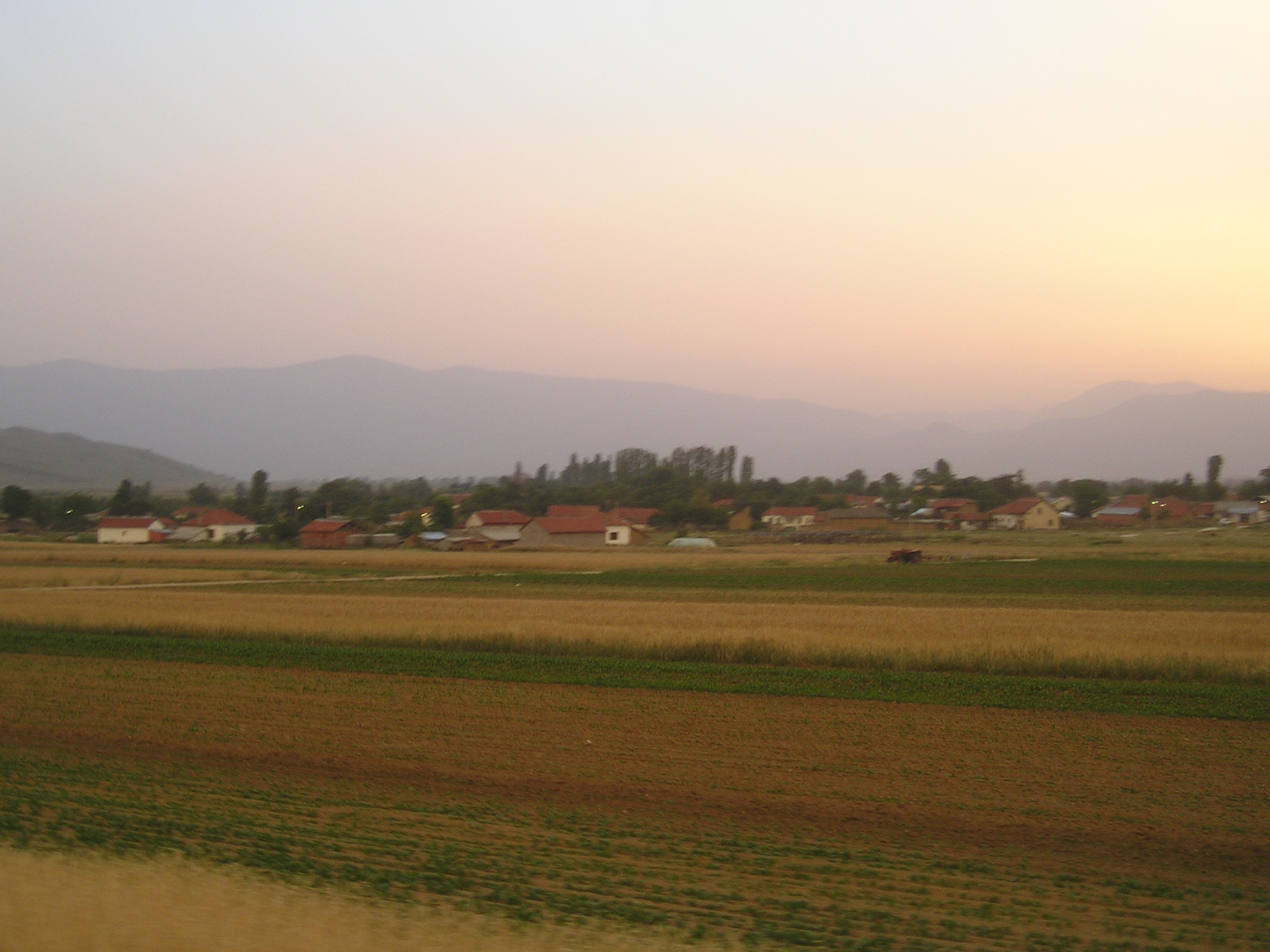

- Location within North Macedonia
- Country: North Macedonia
- Region: Pelagonia
- Municipality: Dolneni
- Elevation: 623 m (2,044 ft)

Population (2021)
  - Total: 271
- Time zone: UTC+1 (CET)
- Area code: +38948

Senokos (Macedonian: Сенокос) is a village in the municipality of Dolneni, North Macedonia. It is located 11 kilometers northeast from Prilep. It is divided into three parts, and inhabited by Macedonians.

== Demographics ==
According to the 2021 census, the village had a total of 271 inhabitants. Ethnic groups in the village include:

- Macedonians: 268
- Persons for whom data are taken from administrative sources: 2
- Other: 1

Year	Macedonian	Albanian	Turks	Romani	Vlachs	Serbs	Bosniaks	Others	Total
2002	313	...	...	...	...	...	...	2	315
2021	268	...	...	...	...	...	...	3	271

== Sports ==
The local football club is called Red Star FC.
