= Senokos, Dimitrovgrad =

Senokos Сенокос
- Village
- Location within Serbia
- Coordinates: 43°08′35″N 22°55′33″E
- Country: Serbia
- Region: Southern and Eastern Serbia
- District: Pirot
- Municipality: Dimitrovgrad

Population (2002)
  - Total: 44
- Time zone: UTC+1 (CET)
  - Summer (DST): UTC+2 (CEST)

Senokos is a village in the municipality of Dimitrovgrad, Serbia. According to the 2002 census, the village has a population of 44 people. In 2026 eight people live in the village, mostly being the family of Fabio.
