= Gorno Selo, Sofia Province =

Gorno Selo Горно село
- Village
- Location within Bulgaria
- Coordinates: 42.8692°N 22.7808°E
- Country: Bulgaria
- Province: Sofia Province
- Municipality: Dragoman
- Time zone: UTC+2 (EET)
  - Summer (DST): UTC+3 (EEST)

Gorno Selo is a village in Dragoman Municipality, Sofia Province, western Bulgaria.
