= Senokos, Vrapčište =

Senokos Сенокос Sanakos
- Village
- Location within North Macedonia
- Coordinates: 41°52′43″N 20°53′03″E
- Country: North Macedonia
- Region: Polog
- Municipality: Vrapčište

Population (2021)
  - Total: 1,351
- Time zone: UTC+1 (CET)
  - Summer (DST): UTC+2 (CEST)
- Car plates: GV
- Website: .

Senokos (Macedonian: Сенокос, Albanian: Sanakos) is a village in the municipality of Vrapčište, North Macedonia. It used to be part of Negotino-Pološko Municipality.

== Demographics ==
Senokos is attested in the 1467/68 Ottoman tax registry (defter) for the Nahiyah of Kalkandelen. The village had a total of 13 Christian households and 2 bachelors.

As of the 2021 census, Senokos had 1,351 residents with the following ethnic composition:

- Albanians 1,288
- Persons for whom data are taken from administrative sources 62
- Macedonians 1

According to the 2002 census, the village had a total of 1,634 inhabitants. Ethnic groups in the village include:

- Albanians 1,602
- Macedonians 2
- Bosniaks 2
- Others 28

According to the 1942 Albanian census, Senokos was inhabited by 434 Muslim Albanians.

In statistics gathered by Vasil Kanchov in 1900, the village of Senokos was inhabited 380 Muslim Albanians by 42 Orthodox Macedonians.
