= Gorno Selo, Dolneni =

Gorno Selo Горно Село
- Village
- Location within North Macedonia
- Country: North Macedonia
- Region: Pelagonia
- Municipality: Dolneni
- Elevation: 955 m (3,133 ft)

Population (2021)
  - Total: 7
- Time zone: UTC+1 (CET)
- Area code: +38948

Gorno Selo (Macedonian: Горно Село) is a village in the municipality of Dolneni, North Macedonia. The meaning of the name is: Upper village.

== Demographics ==
According to the 2021 census, the village had a total of 7 inhabitants. Ethnic groups in the village include:

- Macedonians 7

Year	Macedonian	Albanian	Turks	Romani	Vlachs	Serbs	Bosniaks	Others	Total
2002	38	...	...	...	...	1	...	...	39
2021	7	...	...	...	...	...	...	...	7
