= Milivoje Trbić =

Yugoslav military officer

Milivoje Trbić (Serbian Cyrillic: Миливоје Трбић), known as Vojče (Војче) or Voja (Воја), was a Yugoslav army captain (kapetan) and member of the Chetniks during World War II in Yugoslavia.

Trbić was born in Prilep, Kingdom of Serbia (now in North Macedonia). His father, Chetnik commander (vojvoda) Vasilije Trbić (1881–1962), was a veteran who had commanded guerrilla bands in the Macedonian Struggle (1904–08) and Balkan Wars (1912–13). Following the Yugoslav coup d'état in March 1941, Vasilije Trbić was overtly antagonistic towards the political and military leaders of the Kingdom of Yugoslavia, whom he blamed for the Axis invasion of the country. Milivoje Trbić had the rank of captain (kapetan) in the Royal Yugoslav Army. He was sent by the HQ of the Yugoslav Army in the Fatherland to the Prilep area of Macedonia in 1941, in order to organize Chetnik detachments. Since 1941, he was the commander of the Poreče Chetnik Detachment, active in the Bitola, Prilep and Veles srezi. He was the commander of the Prilep Brigade and second commander of the Veles Brigade, of the 2nd Vardar Corpus (Poreče Corps, formed in late 1943). On 19 June 1944, the Prilep Brigade was united with the Veles Brigade, while Trbić became the assistant to the commander of the Vardar Military Oblast. He was killed in action in 1945 while fighting on the Babuna mountain.

== Sources ==
- Trbić, Vasilije (1996). Memoari: Sećanja i doživljaji vojvode veleškog [Memoirs: Memories and Experiences of the Vojvoda from Veleš] (in Serbian). Belgrade: Kultura. ISBN 978-86-7801-013-2.
- Malkovski, Ǵorǵi (1995). Профашистичките и колаборационистичките организации и групи во Македонија 1941-1944 година. Skopje: Institut za nacionalna istorija. ISBN 978-9989-62411-7. OCLC 494602261.
- Samardžić, Miloslav (22 March 2013). "Формација Југословенске војске крајем 1943. године". Pogledi. Archived from the original on 4 November 2013.
- Karapandžić, Borivoje M (1958). Gradanski rat u Srbiji.
