= Sredorek, Kyustendil Province =

Sredorek Средорек
- Village
- Location within Bulgaria
- Coordinates: 42.5572°N 22.5642°E
- Country: Bulgaria
- Province: Kyustendil Province
- Municipality: Treklyano
- Time zone: UTC+2 (EET)
  - Summer (DST): UTC+3 (EEST)

Sredorek is a village in Treklyano Municipality, Kyustendil Province, south-western Bulgaria. As of end of 2013, its population was 43.
