= Dolneni Municipality =

Municipality of North Macedonia

Coordinates: 41.45°N 21.45°E

Municipality of Dolneni Општина Долнени Komuna e Dollnenit
- Municipality
- Flag Coat of arms

- Country: North Macedonia
- Region: Pelagonia
- Municipal seat: Dolneni

Government
  - Mayor: Blerim Islami (VLEN)

Area
  - Total: 412.43 km^{2} (159.24 sq mi)

Population
  - Total: 13,126
- Time zone: UTC+1 (CET)
- Vehicle registration: PP
- Website: Official Website

Dolneni (Macedonian: Долнени, Albanian: Dollnen) is a municipality in the central part of North Macedonia. Dolneni is also the name of the village where the municipal seat is located. The municipality is part of the Pelagonia Statistical Region.

== Geography ==
The municipality borders the Čaška Municipality to the northeast, the Prilep Municipality to the southeast, the Krivogaštani Municipality to the south, the Kruševo Municipality to the southwest, and the Makedonski Brod Municipality to the northwest.

== Demographics ==
According to the 2021 North Macedonia census, this municipality has 13,126 inhabitants. Ethnic groups in the municipality include:

	2002		2021	
	Number	%	Number	%
TOTAL	13,568	100	13,126	100
Albanians	3,616	26.65	4,442	33.84
Macedonians	4,871	35.9	3,831	29.19
Turks	2,597	19.14	2,434	18.54
Bosniaks	2,380	17.54	2,006	15.28
Serbs	16	0.12	13	0.1
Vlachs			7	0.05
Roma	13	0.1		
Other / Undeclared / Unknown	75	0.55	21	0.17
Persons for whom data are taken from administrative sources			372	2.83

Religious affiliation according to the 2002 Macedonia census and 2021 North Macedonia census:

	2002		2021	
	Number	%	Number	%
TOTAL	13,568	100	13,126	100
Islam	8,605	63.4	8,873	67.6
Orthodox	4,870	35.9	3,585	29.5
Christians	1	0.01	259	29.5
Catholics	8	0.06	32	29.5
Others	84	0.62	5	0.04
Persons for whom data are taken from administrative sources	n/a	n/a	372	2.83

== Inhabited places ==
There are 36 inhabited places in this municipality.

Inhabited Places	Total	Macedonians	Albanians	Turks	Roma	Vlachs	Serbs	Bosniaks	Others
Dolneni	13,126	3,831	4,442	2,434	-	-	-	2,006	413
Belo Pole	174	166	7	-	-	-	-	-	1
Brailovo	186	183	1	-	-	-	1	-	1
Crnilište	1.937	23	1.894	2	-	-	-	-	18
Debrešte	2.600	81	528	1.941	-	-	-	3	43
Desovo	1.108	76	347	8	-	-	-	603	74
Dolgaec	41	39	-	-	-	-	-	-	2
Dolneni	300	287	1	-	-	-	-	-	12
Drenovci	235	222	3	-	-	-	-	-	10
Dupjačani	127	124	1	-	-	-	-	-	2
Gorno Selo	7	7	-	-	-	-	-	-	-
Gostiražni	135	31	97	-	-	-	1	-	6
Kostinci	72	71	-	-	-	-	-	-	1
Košino	66	60	2	-	-	-	-	-	4
Kutleševo	25	25	-	-	-	-	-	-	-
Lažani	1.755	264	153	377	-	-	-	901	60
Lokveni	144	11	4	3	-	-	1	115	11
Malo Mramorani	46	46	-	-	-	-	-	-	1
Margari	7	7	-	-	-	-	-	-	-
Nebregovo	118	105	-	-	-	-	-	-	13
Novoselani	94	87	-	-	-	-	-	-	7
Peštalevo	511	254	119	93	-	-	1	30	14
Rilevo	48	46	1	-	-	-	-	-	1
Ropotovo	516	487	2	-	-	-	1	-	26
Sarandinovo	93	93	-	-	-	-	-	-	-
Sekirci	258	247	-	-	-	-	-	-	11
Senokos	271	268	-	-	-	-	-	-	3
Slepče	34	24	-	-	-	6	-	-	4
Slivje	23	21	-	-	-	-	-	-	2
Sredorek	30	30	-	-	-	-	-	-	-
Strovija	24	18	-	-	-	-	6	-	-
Vranče	84	79	-	-	-	-	-	-	5
Zabrčani	50	49	-	-	-	-	-	-	1
Zapolžani	229	218	1	-	-	-	-	-	10
Zrze	39	36	-	-	1	-	-	-	2
Žabjani	49	46	1	-	-	-	-	-	2
Žitoše	1.690	1	1.280	10	-	-	3	354	42
