= Pelagonia Statistical Region =

Coordinates: 41°21′36″N 21°33′36″E

Pelagonia Statistical Region Пелагониски Регион
- Statistical region
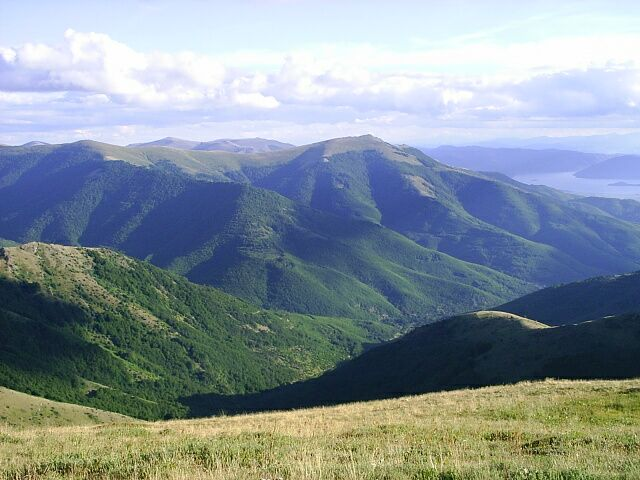
- Baba Mountain

- Logo

- Country: North Macedonia

Area
  - Total: 4,719 km^{2} (1,822 sq mi)

Population (2021)
  - Total: 210,431
  - Density: 44.59/km^{2} (115.5/sq mi)
- HDI (2019): 0.772 high · 2nd of 8
- Website: pelagonijaregion.mk

The Pelagonia Statistical Region (Macedonian: Пелагониски Регион, romanized: Pelagoniski Region or Pelagonija) is one of eight statistical regions of North Macedonia. It is located in southwestern part of the country along the eponymous plain, bordering Greece to the south and Albania to the west. Internally, it borders the Southwestern and Vardar statistical regions.

== Economy ==
Pelagonia (Macedonian Pelagonija)

Tobacco: Prilep is renowned as a leading producer of Oriental tobacco. The region's climate and soil produces leaves that are cultivated, processed, and graded locally before being exported to international tobacco manufacturers and global cigarette companies. locally the Company that Prilep is home to is Tutunski kombinat Prilep.

Processed foods and grain: Companies like ZK Pelagonija AD export wheat, barley, and sunflower oil seeds. Additionally, finished gourmet products like jarred Ajvar (pepper spread) are exported to supermarket chains across Europe.

Manufacturing Historically Bitola and Prilep during the Yugoslav period experienced a significant industrial boom, particularly in metalworking, Composite Materials, and the manufacturing of industrial components When it came toward the Defense industry Prilep remained an important centre for military and industrial manufacturing. The state-owned company 11 Oktomvri–Eurokompozit specialised in ballistic protection equipment and military components, supplying Macedonia's armed forces and security institutions. The company closed operations in 2018 Metalworking and metal fabrication were major sources of industrial employment in the region, with companies such as (FOD DOOEL Novaci) (Rostfrei Major Inox) and (MONTING Engineering) playing important roles in the development of the local manufacturing sector

Sivec Marble: Extracted from the massive quarries near Prilep, this pure white dolomite marble is exported globally for luxury hotels, religious monuments, and other architecture

REK Bitola is a large coal mining and energy complex that produces most of the country's electricity. It includes a surface lignite coal mine and a thermal power plant with three units.

== Controversies ==
Pelagonia essentially functions as the economic and energy muscle of North Macedonia, but it inherits all of the severe environmental, medical, and financial downsides while the capital city, Skopje, reaps the rewards.

Residents rely on deteriorating regional roads and aging public infrastructure, while significantly greater public investment has been directed toward major capital projects in Skopje, including government buildings, urban redevelopment initiatives, transport infrastructure, and other high-value developments.

== Municipalities ==
Map of the municipalities of the region

Pelagonia statistical region is divided into 9 municipalities:

- Bitola
- Demir Hisar
- Dolneni
- Krivogaštani
- Kruševo
- Mogila
- Novaci
- Prilep
- Resen

== Demographics ==
Map of the majority ethnic groups in the region

=== Population ===
The population of the Pelagonia Statistical Region is 238,136 citizens, or 11.8% of the population of the Republic of North Macedonia, according to the census of 2002.

Census Year	Population	Change
1994	214,709	N/A
2002	238,136	+10.91%
2021	210,431	-11.7%

=== Ethnicities ===
The largest ethnic group in the region are Macedonians.

	2002		2021	
	Number	%	Number	%
TOTAL	238,136	100	210,431	100
Macedonians	204,471	85.86	164,596	78.22
Albanians	11,689	4.91	10,776	6.07
Roma	7,268	3.05	7,205	3.42
Turks	7,527	3.16	6,679	3.17
Bosniaks	2,627	1.1	2,293	1.09
Vlachs	2,341	0.98	2,566	1.03
Serbs	869	0.36	583	0.28
Others / Undeclared / Unknown	1,344	0.58	1,494	0.71
Persons for whom data are taken from administrative sources			12,639	6.01

== See also ==
- Pelagonia
