= Chetniks in the Balkan Wars =

Serbian paramilitary units during the Balkan Wars

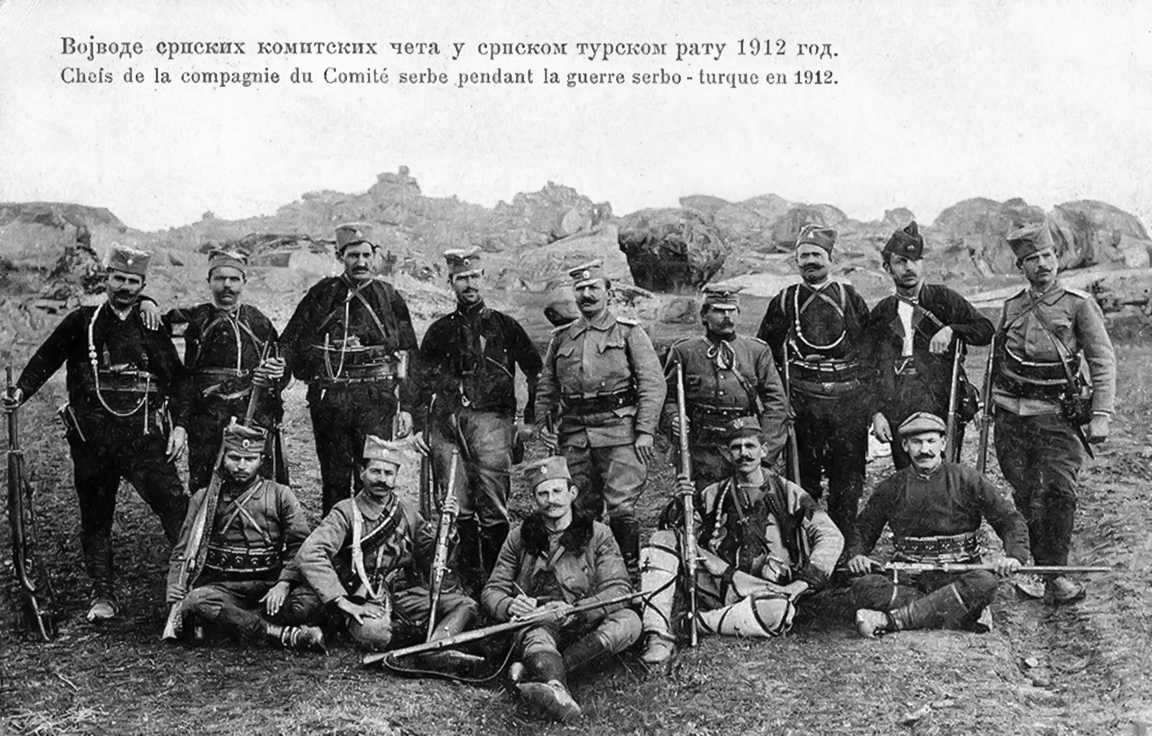
- Chetnik commanders in the Balkan Wars c. 1912
- Active: 8 Oct 1912 – 10 Aug 1913
- Country: Serbia
- Allegiance: Kingdom of Serbia
- Type: Auxiliaries
- Engagements: Balkan Wars

The Chetniks in the Balkan Wars, were paramilitary groups issued of the Serbian Chetnik Organization which, after fighting in the Macedonian Struggle, came under the supervision of the Royal Serbian Army as auxiliary force. During the Balkan Wars, the Chetniks detachments were used as a vanguard to soften up the enemy forward of advancing armies, for attacks on communications behind enemy lines, as field gendarmerie and to establish basic administration in occupied areas. They were used in both Balkan Wars.

== Background ==
The Chetniks were members of Serbian irregular units that were active following Serbia's struggle for independence against the Turks in the nineteenth century starting with the Macedonian Struggle. Those guerrilla detachments, known to the Ottomans as Komitadji, first fought for the liberation of Christian territories from imperial Ottoman rule then mostly against rival komitadji bands in Ottoman Macedonia such as the Bulgarian IMRO as both group aimed to maintain and assert their respective national interests in Macedonia. The Chetniks were territorially based fighting forces, organised into small bands and under the command of a Vojvoda (Field Marshal).

== Operational history ==
At the outbreak of the Balkan War, two Chetnik detachments were set up in Macedonia under Serbian high command: the Kozjak detachment, under Voivoda Vojin Popović (known as Vojvoda Vuk) covering an area stretching from Skopska Crna Gora to Kriva Palanka, a force of 11 companies, and the Transvardar detachment, under the command of military commander Voivoda Milivoje Čolak-Antić, which covered the area of Azot, Porecie, Kicevo and Debar and was composed of 16 companies.

During the Serbian mobilization, the Chetnik detachments of the Serbian 3rd Army included: Medveđa, detachment headed by captain Dusan Sekulic, Ljubomir Vulović and Nikodim Racic (Lisica-Prapaštice-Priština), and detachment headed by Božin Simić (Svirci-Novo Brdo-Kačanik); Kuršumlija, under the command of captain and Chetnik vojvoda Vojislav Tankosić and captain Dragutin Nikolic (Kuršumlija-Merdare-Malo Kosovo-Štimlje-Crnoljeva-Prizren-Ljuma); Lukovo, under the command of captain Pavle Blažarić (Lukovo-Madljika-Drenica); and Kolašin, under the command of prota Vukajlo Božović. Alongside these detachments, were two smaller ones located at the front of the Ibar Army, the first headed by reserve lieutenant Panta Miladinović, the second headed by Chetnik vojvoda Živko Gvozdić. The commander of all these detachments was major Marjanović.

Other notable detachments:

- Laplje Detachment, commanded by Vojislav Tankosić
- Third Army Detachments of Major Alimpije Marjanovic

== Images ==
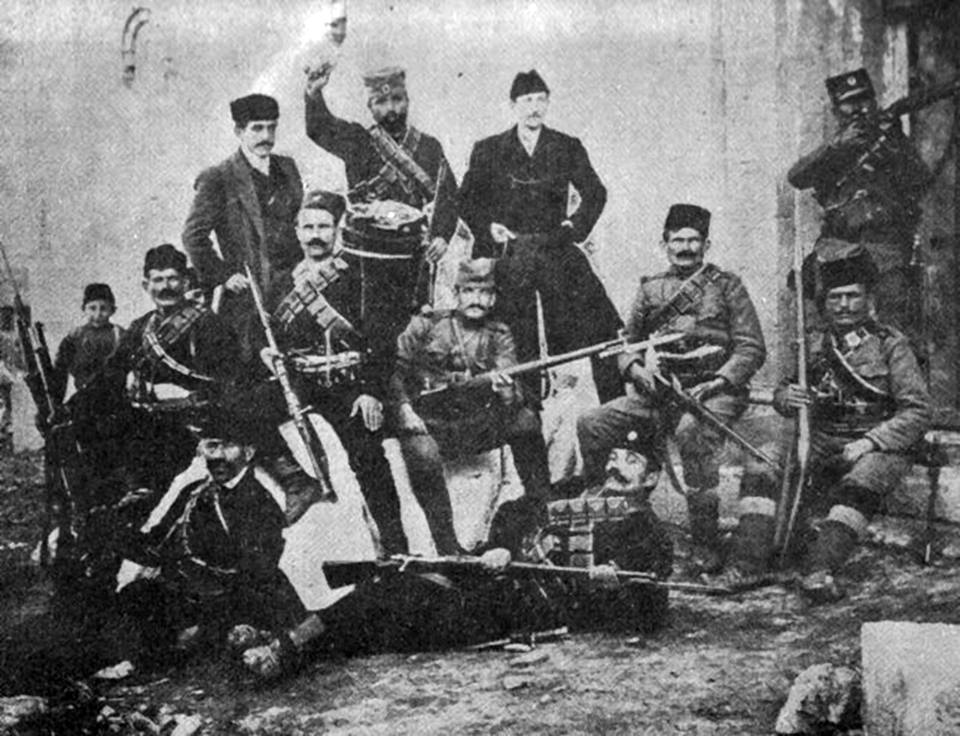
Mirko Đupić's unit, 1912

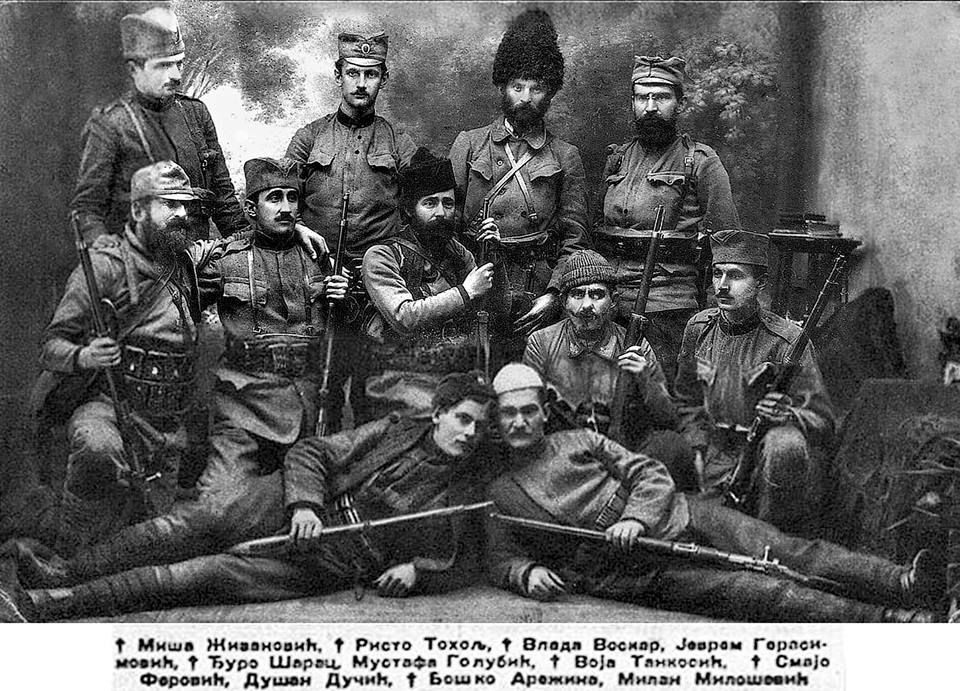
Vojislav Tankosić's unit, 1912

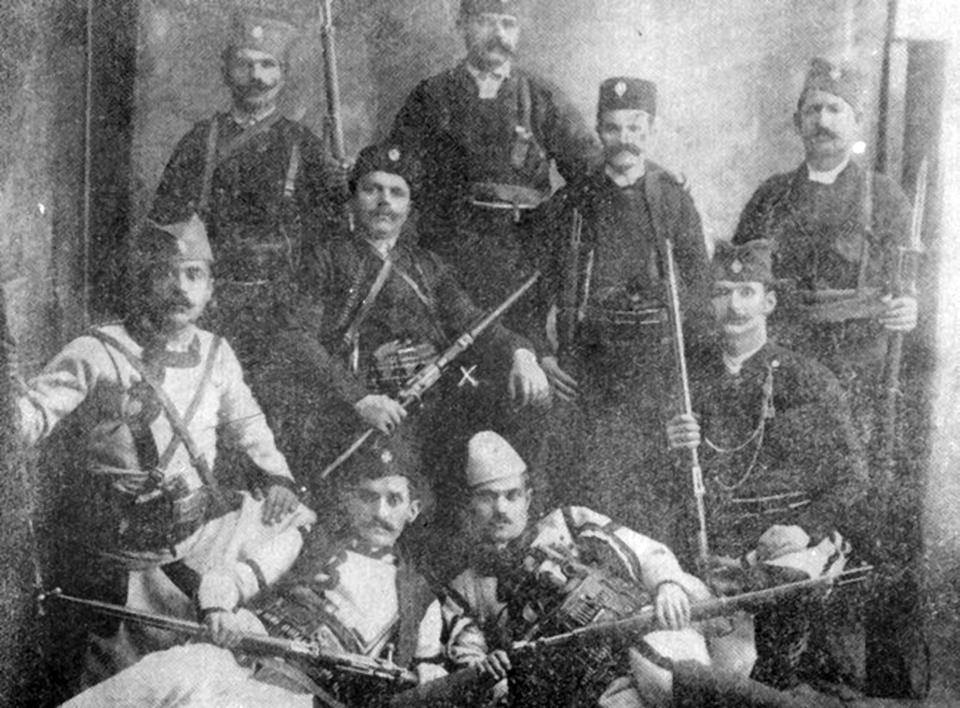
Stefan Nedić-Ćela's unit, 1912–13

== Sources ==
- Rudić, S.; Milkić, M.; Institute of History, B.I.B. (2013). The Balkan Wars 1912/1913 : New Views and Interpretations. Institute of History, Institute for Strategic Research. p. 85. ISBN 978-86-7743-103-7.
- Schurman, J.G. (2009). The Balkan Wars: 1912-1913, Third Edition. Floating Press. ISBN 978-1-77541-166-6.
- Tomasevich, Jozo (1975). The Chetniks. Stanford University Press. ISBN 978-0-8047-0857-9.
- Trifunović, Ilija (1933). Trnotivim stazama (in Serbian). Belgrade.
