= Order of battle of the Serbian Army (1876–1878) =

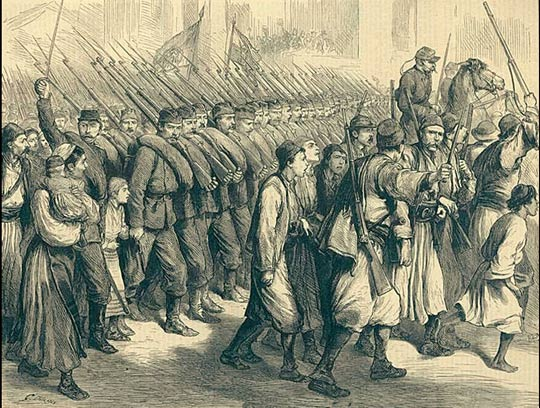
Soldiers heading out.

The following are the orders of battle of the Serbian Army during the Serbian–Ottoman Wars (1876–1878).

== August 1877 ==
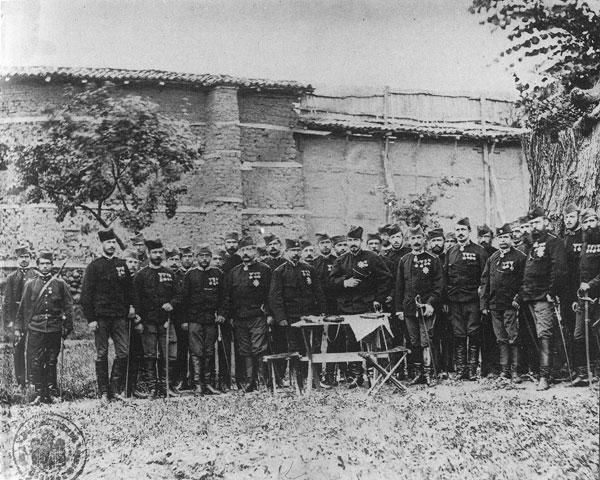
Supreme Command in 1876–77.

Reorganization by Colonel Sava Grujić, Minister of the Army, into five corps:

- Šumadija Corps, with 15,500 fighters and 146 officers.
- Morava Corps, with 18,450 fighters and 118 officers.
- Timok Corps, with 22,150 soldiers and 124 officers.
- Javor Corps, with 13,100-15,000 soldiers and 66 officers.
- Drina Corps, with 12,350-19,000 fighters and 54 officers.

== 28 December 1877 ==
=== Zaječar Army ===
- Zaječar Army (Зајечарска војска), Staff in Kobišnjica.
  - Negotin Crew (Неготинска посада), in Kobišnjica three infantry bands (чете пешака), three cavalry platoons (вода коњице) and 16 positional artillery cannons (позицијских топова). Near Balejskih pivnica one infantry band and 6 positional cannons. Near Tamnič 17 infantry bands, two light cannons, one cavalry platoon. Near Visok, three infantry bands, a light battery and 14 positional cannons. In Donji Milanovac and Tekija one infantry platoon each. All of the II. class. Staff in Kobišnjica.
  - Kula Crew (Кулска посада), two battalions of Crna Reka I. class (I. and IV.); three battalions of Crna Reka II. class (I–III.) with one band in Bojnik and towards Lipak karaula on the Vidin road; I. Heavy Timok battery (тешка тимочка батерија), Crna Reka brigade light battery, Crna Reka active escadron, three pioneer bands (one active and two reserve) and an ammunition column.
  - Krajina Army (Крајинска војска) ready to set out for Ak-Palanka. Krajina battalion I. and three Krajina battalions of II. class, the active escadron, II. Heavy battery, pioneer band, lower officers with Staff. In Salaš turski three bands of the IV. Crna Reka battalion II. class from Kadibogaz; in Rakovica one band of said battalion from Šaške. On Sv. Nikola two battalions of the Knjaževac brigade I. class (I. and II.); I. Highland Timok battery (брдска Тимочка батерија), half of Knjaževac escadron and a pioneer band. Of these two battalions, one band was sent into Čuprenj.

=== Timok Corps ===
- Timok Corps (Тимочки кор), Staff in Trn.
  - Knjaževac Army (Књажевачка војска), a Volunteer battalion (Добровољачки батаљон) and Požarevac escadron in Radomir, with infantry and cavalry outposts towards Kyustendil to Klisura. Rudnik escadron moved from Sofia to Breznik. Knjaževac brigade I. class (four battalions), three battalions of the Combined brigade (комбиноване бригаде), V. Field battery of Šumadija, four cannons of the III. Field Timok battery, Knjaževac escadron and pioneer Knjaževac band in Breznik. One battalion of the Combined brigade, 200 volunteers, two 4-pound cannons of the III. Field battery, in Klisura before Trn. One IV. Svrljig battalion II. class, VI. 12-pound battery in Vrapča. III. Timok battalion II. class with brigade Staff in Pirot.
  - Danube Division (Дунавска дивизија), of the Braničevo brigade: Zvižd battalion in D. Brežina; Braničevo light brigade battery to the east of the Ćopino brdo; Rama battalion in G. Matejevci; Mlava battalion in Kamenica; Golubac battalion in D. Matejevci; Omolje battalion in Brenica, IV. and V. Field batteries on Temeni vrh and below Brenica village; outposts towards Vinik. Divisional Staff in Knez-Selo. Of the Požarevac brigade: Požarevac, I. Morava and I. Mlava battalion with brigade Staff, towards Gabrovac on the height (on front line I. Morava and I. Mlava battalion). I. Rama and II. Morava battalions with Knjaževac Hill battery in Vlasotince.

=== Šumadija Corps ===
- Šumadija Corps (Шумадијски кор)
  - I. Šumadija Division (Шумадијска дивизија), of Belgrade brigade: in Dušnik on Kutina, Kosmaj and Posava battalion, travelling for Barbeš (south of Seličevica) and further into Prokuplje; here is also the brigade Staff. Kolubara and Grocka battalion in the village Batušnica, travelling for Prokuplje. Vračar brigade based in Smederevo. Of the Smederevo brigade: I. Podunavlje battalion half in Čaplinac, the other half in Belotinac, and on the Gorica, left wing. II. Podunavlje battalion on the Mramor, travelling for Prokuplje, Jasenica battalion on Gorica, towards I. Podunavlje half-battalion, Orašje battalion left of liberated redoubt on Gorica, between Jasenica and I. Gruža battalion.
  - II. Šumadija Division, of Kragujevac brigade: I. and II. Lepenica battalion on Gorica, to the right of the liberated redoubt; Kragujevac battalion on the right wing towards the white Turkish redoubt; Jasenica and I. Gruža battalion on Markovo Kale in the reserve. Of the Rudnik brigade: II. Gruža battalion in the conquered redoubt on Gorica; Kačer battalion on the conquered Turk fortification on the Mala Kamara (Kuvik), Crna Gora battalion to the right and little behind the Kačer battalion, the Morava battalion in the centre as reserve.
  - Artillery, on Gorica's Markovo Kale a large battery of 26 heavy field cannons: on the right wing a Combined battery (of one platoon each of VI. VII. VIII. batteries of II. Artillery Regiment), beside this to the left 8 heavy cannons of the Kragujevac people's battery, and four cannons of the VIII. Field battery, and I. battery, beside this to the left III. battery, and on the left wing two cannons of the IV. battery. On the far left wing against Gorica fortifications, there were a standing Hill battery, and between it and the Combined battery, the Smederevo brigade with the Jagodina light brigade battery. On the Gabrovac height and surroundings: two cannons of the VII. battery over Suvodol; two cannons of Rudnik Hill battery on the top of Velika Kamara some 500m from Turkish fortification; four cannons of the IV. battery on Vuči Del; two cannons of the VIII. battery on the slant to the left of these; all concentrated towards the Turkish fortification on Mala Kamara (Ćuvik). On the heights between Kutina and Vuči Del: two cannons of Kragujevac brigade battery, two cannons of VIII. Field battery. Below Niška Banja on the height, two cannons of the Rudnik Hill battery.
  - Cavalry, Kragujevac escadron at Brzibrod near Pirot road; II. Kragujevac escadron in the Kutina valley looking for connection with the Vlasotince column. Smederevo escadron outside Knežica village; Požarevac-Smederevo escadron at Gabrovac village, Požarevac and Rudnik escadron were at the time under the command of the Timok Corps. The Kosmaj and Belgrade escadron were not in action.
  - Engineering, the Belgrade pioneer band on Markovo Kale; Smederevo band on the Pirot road establishing telegraphy line; Kragujevac and Rudnik pioneer bands on the Gabrovac height establishing the new positions.

The Staffs were: Corps Staff in Barbatovac; I. Šumadija Division in Holy Trinity monastery; II. Šumadija Division on Markovo Kale; Kragujevac brigade and I. Artillery Regiment on Markovo Kale; Rudnik Brigade and II. Artillery Regiment on Gabrovac height, Belgrade brigade in Dušnik village.

=== Morava Corps ===
- Morava Corps (Моравски кор), outside Niš, Staff in Krušce below Mramor.
  - Of the Morava Division, the Jagodina brigade, of which Belica battalion on left wing toward Popadika hill, II. Temnić battalion at Hum village; I. Temnić and Levač battalion on Čamurlija, with outposts on Komren heights. Jagodina brigade Staff in Rujnik. Morava Division Staff behind Popova glava.
  - Of the Aleksinac Army the Deligrad and Banja battalion II. class to the right of the Jagodina battalion on the Lisinac slant. The rest of battalions with Staff outside Prokuplje.
  - Of the Ćuprija brigade: the Ćuprija, Paraćin and Despotovac battalions on the right banks of Nišava outside Popovce village, the Ćuprija battalion on the left wing beside the Aleksinac battalions, and the Despotovac battalion by the Nišava. On the left bank of Nišava, outside Bubanj, the Resava battalion. Brigade Staff in Lalince.
  - Of the Rudnik brigade II. class: Crna Gora and Kačer battalion on the Mramor. Brigade staff on Mramor.
  - Artillery: I. and IV. Field battery, with two Swiss and one Krupov cannons, 6–12 pound cannons and two 4-pound cannons, a total of 23 cannons in the positional battery at Popovce. A 24-pound cannon entered the battery that day but was never used. III. battery on Mramor with one platoon near Bubanj. Kruševac light battery on Čamurlija.
  - Cavalry: Jagodina escadron in Trupale village, Ćuprija escadron in Novo Selo.
- Morava Corps, between Prokuplje and Kuršumlija:
  - Barlovo position, on the left wing before Točane on the height, the Kruševac battalion II. class, between the Kuršumlija and Toplica roads on the hillock, two platoons of II. Heavy battery; on the other side of the road before the Pločnik village the I. class battalion of Aleksinac Army, with outposts before Barlovo; to the right on the highest height above Barlovo a combined Trstenik battalion, immediately to the right the I. Field battery of the Ibar Division, behind these the Ćuprija–Kruševac reserve escadron; to the right of the battery leaning on the Kuršumlija–Jankova Klisura road, the Rasina combined battalion I. class, on the other side of the road to the right the Studenica battalion I. class, on the height between this and the Perunika village two bands of the Jošanica and two bands of the Koznica battalion II. class, leaning to the right on the Toplica river and the Novi Pazar road; near the road, at the Pločnik village three battalions (Karanovac, Trnava and Dragačevo) I. class.
  - Belonjin position, in Belonjin the Koznica and Kruševac battalions I. class, with Kruševac escadron and pioneer band and four cannons of the V. Heavy battery; here is the Staff of Kruševac brigade I. class. All arrived from Mramor. The Čačak pioneer band established the Belonjin position. In the evening the Deligrad and Banja battalions I. class arrived and the VI. Field battery of the Morava Corps with the Staff of Aleksinac Army. In Prokuplje the Morava Bulgarian battalion II. class with two cannons of the V. Field battery, and some insurgents in Žitorađa. Near Blace and Jankova Klisura the Kruševac and Čačak replenishment battalion. The Staff of the Commander of the Army (Штаб команданта војске) outside Kuršumlija in Batski han.
  - At Kočane, the Morava battalion of Rudnik II. class with two cannons of the II. Field battery.
  - In Leskovac, the Jošanica combined battalion I. class, with Aleksinac people's battery.
  - On the Kopaonik, eight bands of the Jošanica battalion II. class around Jarinje, assigned to the Raška Army; two bands of the Koznica battalion II. class with 180 insurgents occupied the Kopaonik passes near Trebinje and Vrelo.

=== Javor Corps ===
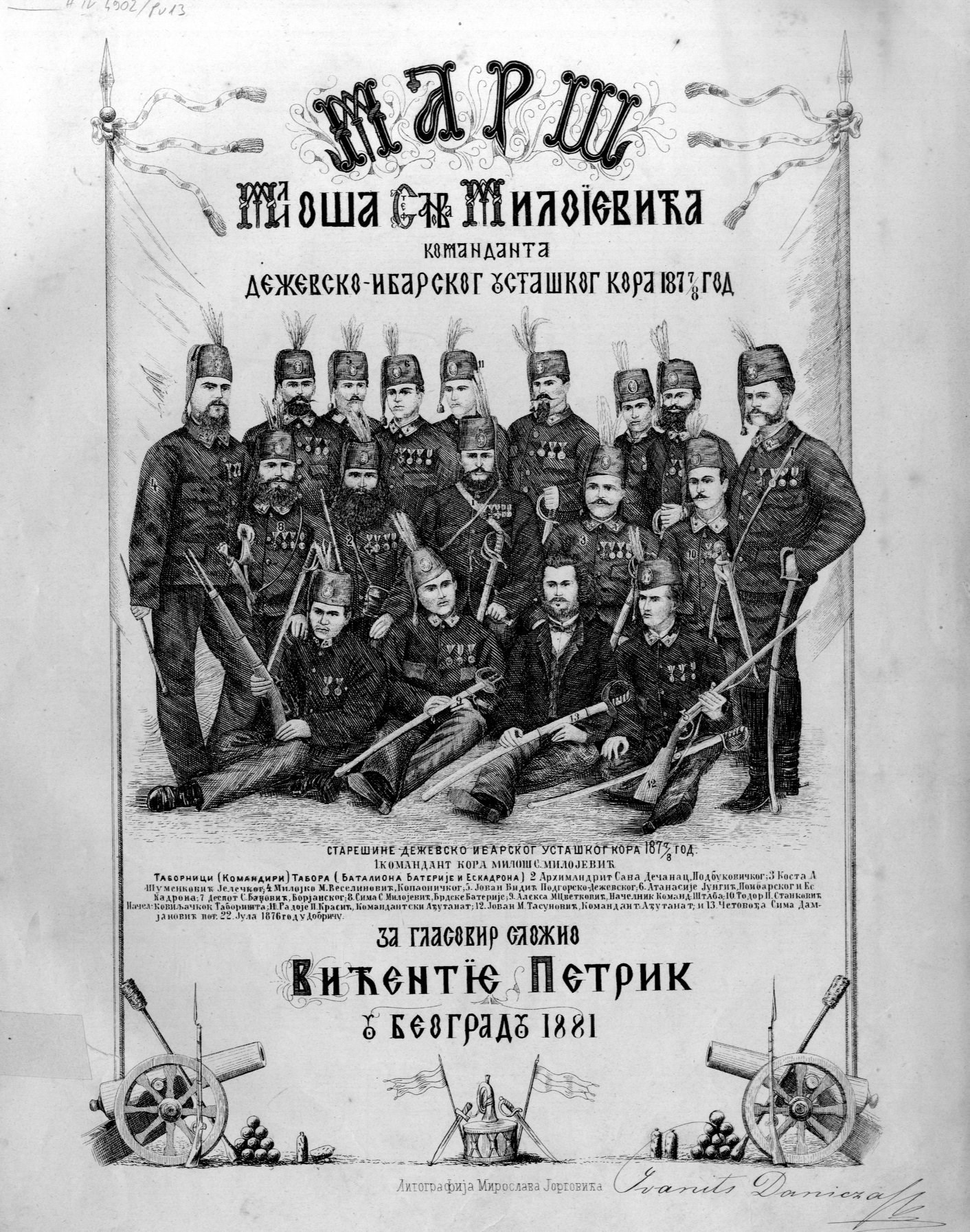
Deževa–Ibar insurgent commanders.

- Javor Corps (Јаворски кор)
  - Raška Army (Рашка војска), left wing, of the Čačak brigade II. class: Trnava battalion on Golice and Zmijinjak; Studenica battalion on Glavoč and Paresije, Dragačevo battalion on Sokolovica or Golice, Karanovac battalion on Grab and Glušac hill, pioneer band on Sokolovica. Brigade Staff and Hill battery on Golice, of the Hill battery two cannons on Sokolovica. The Deževa–Ibar insurgents camped in Opava, Gnježdane and Kijevčić with outposts towards Jova, Dragunac, Lopužnje, Duboka, Baljevo brdo, Orlić, Dobrava, Lopata and Belasica. The Staff of the insurgents is at Borova glava with three insurgent bands and an insurgent escadron. On Jarinje by the Ibar two bands of the Jošanica battalion II. class. On the Raška the Staff of the Commander of the Raška Army.
  - Javor Army, centre, of the Užice brigade I. class: Moravica battalion on the Stupska česma protecting the border from Suvi Rt to Odvraćenica; Rača battalion on Jankov Vrh; Požega battalion in Kladnica with forward sentries to Vapa and Uvac. Insurgent bands to the right with scattered outposts to Bukovik and Božetić. The main body of the Army at Javor: Crna Gora battalion on Boletin and Vučija Poljana with two cannons of II. Heavy battery, Zlatibor battalion, four cannons of II. Heavy battery, Valjevo brigade battery, Užice and Valjevo pioneer band, I. active escadron below Veliki Ograđenik; Arilje battalion, reserve Užice escadron and reserve Užice pioneer band with I. Hill battery below Vasilijin Vrh, these troops dispatched forward units to Jankov Vrh, Kalipolje, Leskovac, Vučiji Vrh and Rogopek. Brigade Staff with small parts on Javor. Reserve troops of the Tamnava and Kolubara battalions of Valjevo brigade I. class at Biljevina, brigade staff stationed here, the three remaining battalions of the brigade (Valjevo, Posava, Podgor), with the regimental Staff in Ivanjica, traveling to Niš. Požega and Morava battalion II. class and V. Heavy battalion on Kušiće. Corps' Staff on Kušiće. Ammunition column in Ivanjica.
  - Zlatibor Army, right wing, of the Užice brigade II. class: Arilje battalion in the Rasnica village, with outposts to Amzić and Vraneš; there are also insurgents, the Zlatibor battalion on Markovo Polje (near Mokra Gora) with outposts from Dublje to Karaula Dikava, Rača battalion in Bajina Bašta with ouposts III. class by the Drina. Reserves: Crna Gora battalion, Užice Hill battery and one platoon of cavalry on Kremna. There is also the Staff of the right wing with the rest of small parts.

=== Drina Corps ===
- Drina Corps, left wing, front line:
  - In Loznica: Valjevo and Posava-Tamnava battalion of the Valjevo brigade II. class, with Valjevo brigade battery II. class and two 12-pound cannons. Here is the Podrinje brigade II. class Staff and the Podrinje pioneer band II. class. Staff of the Commander of the left wing in Loznica.
  - In Vlaške Njive and outside Mali Zvornik: Podrinje brigade I. class (3 battalions), Jadar battalion II. class with two Hill (I. and II.) and three mortar batteries and the Podrinje pioneer band I. class.
  - On Ljubovija the Azbukovac battalion II. class and light positional battery.
  - Half of the Podrinje-Valjevo escadron active on the whole line.
  - Second line with reserve: In Pecka the Podgor battalion of the Valjevo brigade II. class and in Krupanj the Rađevo battalion of Podrinje II. class with Hill battery of the Valjevo brigade.
- Drina Corps, right wing from Lešnica to Rača, in two lines. Right wing Staff in Badovinci:
  - First line: In Lešnica the Šabac battalion; in Badovinci the Posava-Tamnava battalion and Šabac light battery; in Crna Bara the I. Mačva battalion.
  - Second line: In Prnjavor the Pocerina battalion and I. Field battery; In Salaš (Klenj) II. Mačva battalion. All battalions of them are from the Šabac brigade II. class, Brigade Staff in Badovinci.
  - In Bogatić the Mačva escadron and two platoons of the III. Field battery.
- Main Reserve under direct command of the Corps' Commander:
  - In Lešnica the Kolubara and Tamnava battalions II. class, Pocerina battalion of the Šabac brigade I. class, with Šabac light battery, active Šabac and reserve Valjevo pioneer band. The Commander of the Corps with Staff in Lešnica, also with the Staff of the Drina artillery brigade.
  - In Novo Selo the Šabac battalion I. class and Šabac pioneer band II. class. The Corps' sanitary department in Novo Selo.
  - In Ribare the Posava battalion I. class Šabac brigade and IV. Field battery.
  - In Petlovača the II. Mačva battalion of the Šabac brigade. The Staff of the Šabac brigade I. class in Petlovača.
  - In Dublje the I. Mačva battalion I. class.
  - In Šabac the Valjevo escadron and Staff of Cavalry Regiment.
  - Staff of Engineering battalion in Loznica.

=== Replenishment battalions ===
That day, replenishment battalions were found at Aleksinac: the Smederevo, Požarevac, Ćuprija and Aleksinac replenishment battalions; at Aleksinačka Banja: the Belgrade, Rudnik and Kragujevac replenishment battalions; on Jankova Klisura: the Kruševac, Čačak and Jagodina replenishment battalions; in Kula the Krajina battalion; in Zaječar the Braničevo and both Crna Reka battalions; in Negotin the Knjaževac battalion.

=== Standing army ===
If not assigned to the operative army, the standing army was distributed as such:

- In Belgrade: IX. battalion infantry and IX. Field battery of the Šumadija Corps.
- In Kragujevac: two bands of the I. battalion.
- In Smederevo: one band of the II. standing battalion, and the Vračar battalion of the national militia.
- In Aleksinac: one band of the IV. battalion as court guard.
- In Topola and Aranđelovac two bands of IV. battalion and II. Field battery of the Šumadija Corps.
- Standing cavalry escadron in Topola, Aranđelovac and Smederevo.

=== Opposing forces ===
The Ottoman forces facing the Serbian Army at this time:

- In Vidin: 16 battalions of infantry, three batteries, four escadron, commanded by Divisional general Izzet Pasha.
- In Belogradchik: two camps of infantry, half escadron and one battery, field cannons beside older fort cannons, commanded by Rifat Bey.
- In Kumanovo–Egri Palanka: 12 battalions, eight escadron and one battery, with some Arnauts.
- In Grdelica: three battalions, around 8,000 bashibozuks and one cannon.
- In Kuršumlija–Prepolac: four camps, two escadron, one battery, 3–4,000 Arnauts.
- In Priština: full of bashibozuks.
- In Mitrovica: 2-3 camps.
- In Novi Pazar: one camp and idadi (cadets) of 2,000.
- In Duga Poljana: one camp.
- In Sjenica: three nizami camps and one redif (reserve) camp with idadi.
- In Nova Varoš: two camps with idadi.
- In Prijepolje: one camp.
- In Plevlja: one redif camp and one mustahafiz camp.
- In Višegrad: three camps, of nizami, redif and mustahafiz, each.
- In Srebrenica and surroundings: three camps.
- In Zvornik and surroundings: 5-6 camps.
- In Bijeljina and surroundings: c. 10 camps.

Exempting the Vidin crew, the Ottoman troops were composed out of 59 battalions (of nizami, redif and mustahafiz), 5-and-a-half escadron of cavalry and c. 40 Field cannons. There were also notable numbers of irregular troops such as Arnauts and bashibozuk-townsmen, and generally idadi, who numbered 13–18,000 fighters. There were also city- and positional artillery in Novi Pazar, Sjenica, Višegrad and Zvornik, which number exceeds 100 cannons of various caliber and construction.

== 23 January 1878 ==
Before the truce.

== See also ==
- First Balkan War order of battle: Serbian Army
- Structure of the Serbian Army during World War I

== Sources ==
- Ratnik (October 1879a). "РАСПОРЕД Српских трупа у време решења судбина Ниша. (28. Децембра 1877. год. у вече)". Ratnik. I (X): 679–690.
- Ratnik (November 1879b). "РАСПОРЕД Српских трупа у време наступившег примирја. (22.—23. Јануара 1878.)". Ratnik. I (X): 873–883.
- Srejović, Dragoslav; Gavrilović, Slavko; Ćirković, Sima M., eds. (1981). Istorija srpskog naroda: knj. Od Prvog ustanka do Berlinskog kongresa, 1804-1878 [History of the Serbian People: From the First Uprising to the Congress of Berlin, 1804-1878] (in Serbian). Srpska književna zadruga.
