= Vukajlo Božović =

Serbian priest and revolutionary (died 1926)

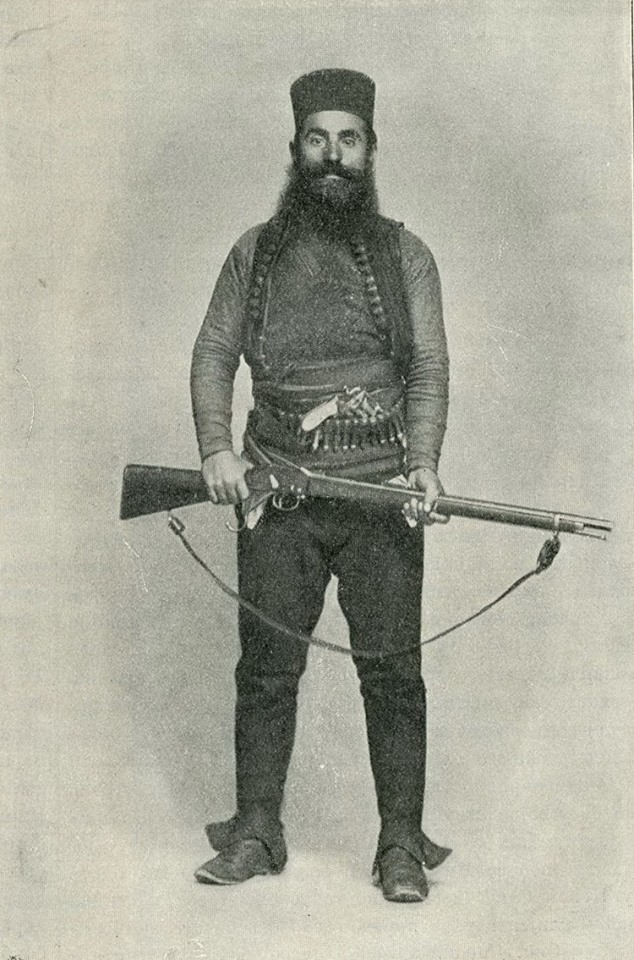
- Božović in 1912
- Born: Ibarski Kolašin
- Died: 1926
- Military career
- Allegiance: Serbia
- Branch: Serbian Army
- Service years: fl. 1912
- Rank: vojvoda
- Conflicts: Balkan Wars

Vukajlo Božović (Serbian Cyrillic: Вукајло Божовић; died 1926), known as Priest Vukajlo (Serbian Cyrillic: поп Вукајло), was a Serbian Orthodox priest and revolutionary. Božović participated in the Balkan Wars as a commander of a detachment in Ibarski Kolašin. He was the father of writer Grigorije Božović.

== First Balkan War ==
During the Serbian mobilization of the First Balkan War, the Chetnik detachments of the Serbian 3rd Army included: Medveđa, colon headed by captain Dušan Sekulić, Ljubomir Vulović and Nikodim Racić (Lisica-Prapaštice-Priština), and colon headed by Božin Simić (Svirci-Novo Brdo-Kačanik); Kuršumlija, under the command of captain and Chetnik vojvoda Vojislav Tankosić and captain Dragutin Nikolić (Kuršumlija-Merdare-Malo Kosovo-Štimlje-Crnoljeva-Prizren-Ljuma); Lukovo, under the command of captain Pavle Blažarić (Lukovo-Madljika-Drenica); and Kolašin, under the command of prota Vukajlo Božović. Alongside these detachments, were two smaller ones located at the front of the Ibar Army, the first headed by reserve lieutenant Panta Miladinović, the second headed by Chetnik vojvoda Živko Gvozdić. The commander of all these detachments was major Alimpije Marjanovic.

== See also ==
- List of Chetnik voivodes
- Jovan Grković-Gapon, priest and fighter
- Stevan Dimitrijević, priest and fighter

== Annotations ==
- Full name: Vukajlo N. Božović

== Sources ==
- Trifunović, Ilija (1933). Trnotivim stazama (in Serbian). Belgrade.
- Mirko Stefanović (1935). Epopeja Beograda (in Serbian). p. 205.
- Janićije N Popović; Vladimir Bovan (1987). Život srba na Kosovu: 1812-1912. NIRO "Književne novine". "А поп Вукајло Божовић из Колашина чак у Приштину доће за то. А кад од конзула не мо- гаше да добије потврдан одговор, он се са Зафиром Николићем, кафеџијом у Приштини, реши да о томе пише непосредно краљу Милану, ..."
