= Živanović =

Živanović (Cyrillic script: Живановић) is a Serbian patronymic surname derived from a masculine given name Živan. It may refer to:

- Aleksandar Živanović (footballer, born 1987), footballer
- Aleksandar Živanović (futsal player) (born 1998), futsal player
- Boris Živanović (born 1989), footballer
- Darko Živanović (born 1987), long-distance runner
- Ivan Živanović (footballer, born 1981), footballer
- Ivan Živanović (footballer, born 1995), footballer
- Milivoje Živanović (1900–1979), actor
- Miloš Živanović (born 1988), footballer
- Mihailo Živanović (1928–1989), musician
- Nenad Živanović (born 1980), footballer
- Stefan Živanović (born 1989), basketball player
- Todor Živanović (1927–1978), footballer
- Vojislav Živanović (1870–1932), general
