= Gvozdić =

Gvozdić (Serbian: Гвоздић) is a Serbo-Croatian surname, derived from the word gvozden, meaning "iron". It may refer to:

- Dušan Gvozdić, basketball coach
- Živko Gvozdić, Serbian soldier
- Stojan Gvozdić, Serbian Orthodox cleric
- Svetozar Gvozdić, Serbian politician
- Pavica Gvozdić, Yugoslav pianist
