= Živko Gvozdić =

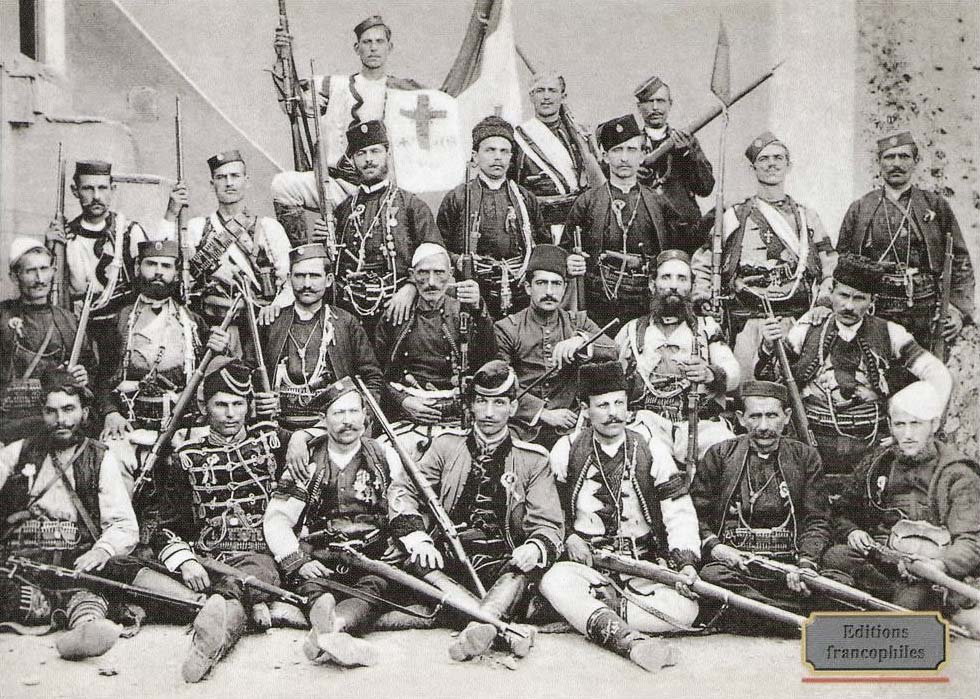
- Serbian voivodes, Gvozdić sitting, first from the left
- Born: Vučitrn, Ottoman Empire (now Kosovo)
- Military career
- Allegiance: Serbian Chetnik Organization (1903–08); (Kingdom of Serbia) Serbian Army (1912–18)
- Service years: 1904–18
- Rank: sergeant, vojvoda
- Conflicts: Macedonian Struggle, Balkan Wars, World War I

Živko Gvozdić (Serbian Cyrillic: Живко Гвоздић; fl. 1903–18) was a Serbian Chetnik commander active in Old Serbia and Macedonia between 1903 and 1908, and a Serbian regiment commander in the Balkan Wars (1912–13) and First World War (1914–18). He was born in Vučitrn. He finished the Belgrade Military School with the rank of sergeant (podnarednik). He joined the Serbian Chetnik Organization upon its establishment. While fighting in West Povardarje, he was subordinate vojvoda Gligor Sokolović. In documents from 1906 and 1907, he is described as an able and courageous fighter.

During the Serbian mobilization of the First Balkan War, the Chetnik detachments of the Serbian 3rd Army included: Medveđa, colon headed by captain Dušan Sekulić, Ljubomir Vulović and Nikodim Racić (Lisica-Prapaštice-Priština), and colon headed by Božin Simić (Svirci-Novo Brdo-Kačanik); Kuršumlija, under the command of captain and Chetnik vojvoda Vojislav Tankosić and captain Dragutin Nikolić (Kuršumlija-Merdare-Malo Kosovo-Štimlje-Crnoljeva-Prizren-Ljuma); Lukovo, under the command of captain Pavle Blažarić (Lukovo-Madljika-Drenica); and Kolašin, under the command of prota Vukajlo Božović. Alongside these detachments, were two smaller ones located at the front of the Ibar Army, the first headed by reserve lieutenant Panta Miladinović, the second headed by Chetnik vojvoda Živko Gvozdić. The commander of all these detachments was major Alimpije Marjanović.

== Sources ==
- Trifunović, Ilija (1933). Trnotivim stazama (in Serbian). Belgrade.
- Stefanović, Mirko (1935). Epopeja Beograda (in Serbian). p. 205. "Гвоздић, Живко"
- Slavić, Dušan (1913). Ilustrovana istorija Balkanskog rata, 1912-1913. Vol. 2. pp. 52–55.
