= Iron Regiment =

Serbian military unit active in the Balkan Wars and World War I

2nd Infantry Regiment The "Iron Regiment"
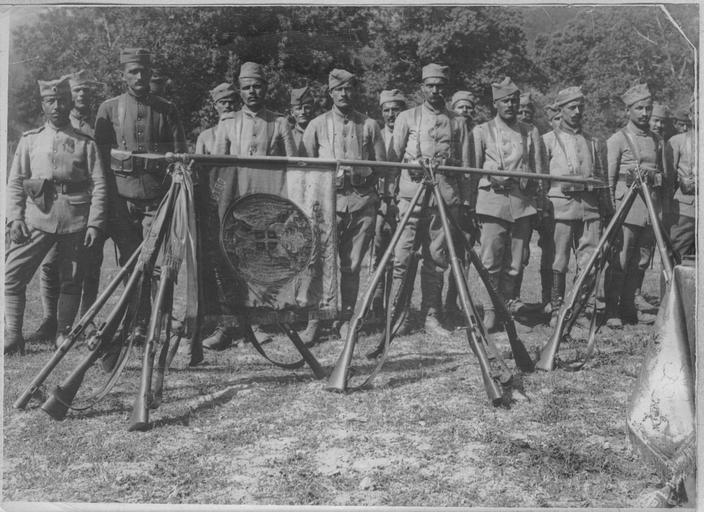
- Members of the regiment in Greece, June 1918
- Founded: 7 October 1912
- Disbanded: 5 May 1920
- Allegiance: Serbia
- Branch: Royal Serbian Army
- Type: Ground Forces
- Size: 4,744 (7–19 October 1912) c. 3,900 (19 November 1912)
- Part of: First Serbian Army, Morava Division
- Garrison/HQ: Prokuplje (wartime), Niš (peacetime)
- Nickname: Iron Regiment (Gvozdeni puk)
- Patron: Prince Mihailo (Knjaz Mihailo)
- Engagements: First Balkan War; Second Balkan War; World War I

The 2nd Infantry Regiment "Prince Mihailo" (Serbian: Други пешадијски пук „Књаз Михајло”), known as the Iron Regiment (Гвоздени пук/Gvozdeni puk), was an military unit of the Morava Division of the Royal Serbian Army that fought in the Balkan Wars and World War I (1912–1918). It was made up of 1st call mobilization men aged 21–31 primarily from the Toplica region (Prokuplje, Kuršumlija, Blace, and Žitorađa) in southeastern Serbia. The unit received its name due to its courage and resilience, and participation in all major battles of the First and Second Balkan Wars, and World War I.

== History ==
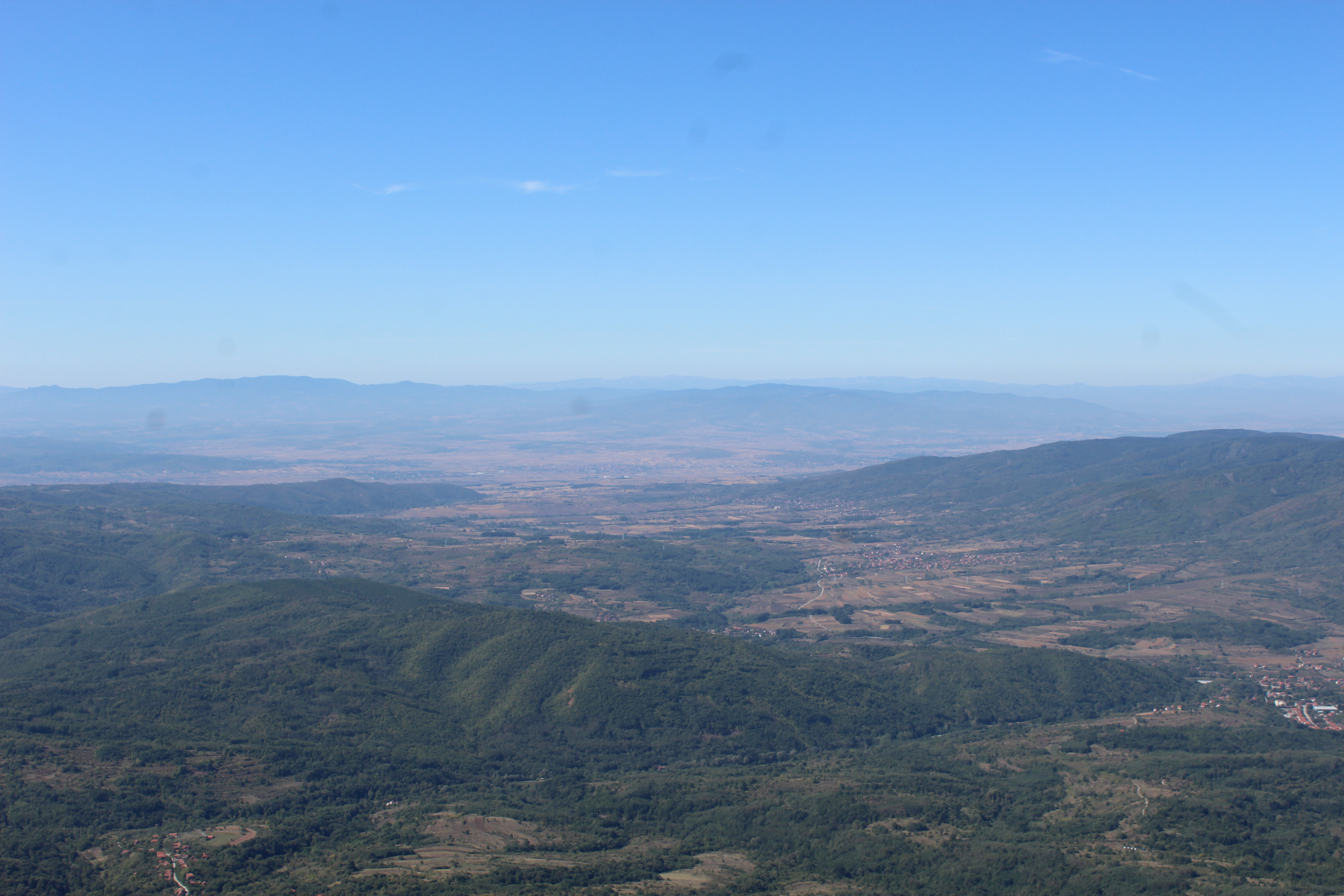
View of a part of Zaplanje, from where many were mobilized into the unit.

=== Background ===
The Toplica region was a military frontier of Serbia towards the Ottoman Empire following its liberation in the 1876–1878 wars. Prokuplje was one of the most elite training centres of the Serbian Army, active in 1908–1912. Volunteers also from outside Serbia came to train here under army major Vojislav Tankosić and his experienced Chetniks (guerrillas) that had fought in "Old Serbia" (North Macedonia and Kosovo). Notably, almost all members of the revolutionary group Young Bosnia trained here.

=== First Balkan War ===
The mobilization for the First Balkan War against the Ottoman Empire began on 3 October 1912. There were 23 officers (oficiri), 29 sub-officers (podoficiri) and corporals (kaplari), 269 with ranks. There were 4744 men between the ages 21–31 mobilized from the villages around the mountains of Kopaonik, Jastrebac, Radan, Suva planina and the valley of Zaplanje. The regiment set out on 7 October and trained outside Vranje until 19 October, when Serbia proclaimed war against the Ottoman Empire. The commander of the regiment was potpukovnik (lieutenant colonel) Vladimir Ristić.

On 19 October the regiment quickly took the village of Trnovac where several hundred armed Muslim Albanians (loyal to the Ottomans) had put up a defence and initiated the fight by shooting at them first, despite negotiations with Ristić. The next day, the First Army (which the Morava Division was part of) received the order of Chief of Staff Radomir Putnik to set out towards Kumanovo, in order to push out Ottoman detachments in the way, and then join up with the Second and Third Armies and move to Ovče Pole where a big battle with the main Ottoman army was anticipated. The regiment was met by a cheering crowd in the village of Oslare, and its advance guard then dispersed an Albanian armed group north of Oraovica. Next, Preševo was taken by the regiment without a fight, as the Ottoman garrison had left in a hurry. The Ottoman Vardar Army was ordered on offensive towards Kumanovo, when the First Army was holding the Vaksince–Tabanovce–Četirce–Nagoričane line, of which the Morava Division I (and the regiment) held the right flank. On 23–24 October, the First Army fought and defeated the Ottoman army at Kumanovo. The importance of the battle was seen in the aftermath, when Skopje surrendered and the Ottoman army redirected towards Bitola, leaving the Serbian army holding firm in conquered territory. The battle is regarded the most notable Serbian victory of the First Balkan War, as it boosted the morale and influenced the further course of the war. The 2nd Infantry Regiment distinguished itself with effort, endurance, and self-sacrifice; 46 men of the regiment fell, and 263 were wounded, at Kumanovo.

The Serbian army continued with the plan of liberating the region of Macedonia and expanding to the Adriatic. The First Army, which took Skopje, was ordered to follow the Ottoman army that moved towards Bitola. The units of the First Army Cavalry, Morava I and Drina I went in the Veles–Babuna–Prilep line. Ottoman forces were defeated on all fronts (Kosovo, Sandžak, Lim–Tara, Skadar, Thessaly, Epirus, Thrace) and the Vardar Army found itself in a strategically unfortunate position. On 27 October the Ottoman Command decided to give up defending the Vardar river and instead decided to strengthen the defense at the Babuna mountain in order to preoccupy the Serbian army, and making time for concentrating Ottoman forces near Bitola. The Serbian attack on Babuna was made difficult due to the harsh geography. Some units of the Morava I (not including the 2nd Infantry Regiment) that were dispatched as a vanguard of the First Army were stopped at Drenovci. The commander of the Cavalry Division Arsen Karađorđević, part of this vanguard, requested from Morava I commander Ilija Gojković for a joint operation; the 2nd Infantry Regiment set out on a special operation to infiltrate the mountain. For four days, the regiment climbed the mountain without food. Combat broke out at all sides of the Babuna on 3 November. At Krstec on the Kozjak mountain (1748m), the regiment worked in the rear of the Ottoman army based at Babuna. An Ottoman platoon was surprised and fought at the Boril peak, of which 17 were taken prisoners. Next, an artillery piece was set up by Gmizović which fired on the Ottoman positions, but it was counter-attacked by an arriving Ottoman rifle battalion which was then reinforced further. The regiment was surrounded by two enemy regiments, but it fought them off which proved a turning point in the battle for Babuna. A strong wind flew over the Kozjak which froze soldiers to death, at which time the right flank of the 4th battalion assaulted the Ottoman positions and was then accompanied by the left flank. Zeki Pasha wrote about Krstec and the regiment in his memoirs: "This engagement at Krstec serves as a good illustration of the quality of the Serbian forces—a single infantry regiment, supported by one battery, withstood an assault by an entire Turkish division and ultimately drove it back". The Drina Division I broke through the Prisad front on 5 November and thereby ended the fighting on Babuna, which left 600–1000 dead Ottoman soldiers. The regiment had 58 dead and 140 wounded at Babuna. After this, the Morava I and Drina I divisions entered and took over Prilep. The Morava Division II took over Tetovo on 30 October and Kičevo on 5 November and then joined up with units of the First Army from Prilep. The victory at Babuna, thanks to the regiment, forced the Ottoman army to retreat from Prilep and meant the liberation of Prilep and breakthrough of the Serbian army into Pelagonija.

The Bitola operation of the First Army, with the goal to liberate Macedonia, took 24 days. The first stage of the operation was completed through the destruction of the Ottoman 5th Corps, in which the regiment had a crucial role in, at Babuna. The Ottoman Command's choice of mustering at Bitola was logical and ideal as in this time of the year, in mid-November, it was exceptionally favourable defensive terrain. Serbian forces were only able to approach on one road leading to Bitola, and the Serbian artillery was unable to accompany them as the terrain was snowy and flooded. Ottoman forces were set up at the many mountains and heights around Bitola, and their artillery bombarded the road, which forced Serbian troops to cross at Šemnica. The regimental priest Luka Marjanović successfully organized dragging out the 7th Battery of the Morava Artillery Regiment (one of 9 in total in the Morava Division) under the command of Dragutin Krstić to the position. A recon unit led by Petar Lazarević liquidated Ottoman outposts on the left riverbank, after which the regiment was to charge the Ottoman forces by the river and in the trenches 500m further in. On the night of 17 November the regiment charged the icy river, in icy rain, while the battery was in a duel with Ottoman artillery (which greatly outnumbered the four Serbian guns) and machine gun fire engulfed the river. French journalist Henri Barbusse wrote of the charge on the river:

Fully uniformed, in the dead of winter, and under a hail of bullets and shrapnel, Serbian soldiers entered the icy water—clasping hands to withstand the force of the current—ducking down and rising back up whenever a shell whistled overhead. The exceptionally high death toll in this battle is due to the fact that most of the wounded—even those with only minor injuries—perished by drowning, tossed about by waves that reached as high as their chests.

The 2nd and 3rd Battalions, followed by the 17th Regiment of the Drina Division, approached the firm Ottoman positions 1km from the river. The 4th Cheta commander Gmizović signalled the charge at the front and was instantly shot and wounded, after which corporal Koković (who fell shortly after) shouted and encouraged the continued charge, with the Cheta followed by the 2nd and 3rd Battalions, managing 400m from Ottoman positions. Seeing that the 2,000 men laid in the mud under constant fire, major Naumović ordered the battalion trumpeter to signal for assault, which "electrified" the men, who entered Sekirane with bombs and close combat and dispersed the 52nd and 57th Ottoman regiments. The battalions managed to position themselves 700m from the Ottoman 7th Corps under Fethi Pasha based in Kočište. The charge, which was 17 hours of ceaseless battle, without food or rest, left many Serbian casualties but was a huge success. After a thick fog in the morning of 18 November, the 2nd and 3rd battalions in the enemy territory saw that they were in a very bad position, about to be encircled, so two Chetas of the 4th battalion was sent from the riverbank to aid them. A successful charge into the Ottoman trenches led to the Ottoman camp to retreat to Resen, with their dead commander Fethi Pasha, thereby opening the road for the Serbian army to Bitola. The regiment had 61 dead and 239 wounded, and 230,000 bullets were spent, in these two days of battle for Bitola. In a month of fighting, the regiment had 166 casualties and 667 wounded, losing a fifth of its manpower. The victory at Kumanovo meant the removal of offensive power of the Ottoman Vardar Army, while the victory near Bitola meant the end of the Vardar Army as an organized structure. Kosovo and North Macedonia were liberated from the Ottoman Empire.

== Composition ==
Regimental staff, 1913.

=== 1912 composition ===
Battalions

- 1st Battalion.
  - 1st Cheta, of the 1st Battalion.
  - 2nd Cheta, of the 1st Battalion, under Milan Najdanović ( †).
  - 3rd Cheta, of the 1st Battalion.
  - 4th Cheta, of the 1st Battalion.
- 2nd Battalion, under major Jovan Naumović.
  - 1st Cheta, of the 2nd Battalion.
  - 2nd Cheta, of the 2nd Battalion, under captain Boško Toskić.
  - 3rd Cheta, of the 2nd Battalion, under reserve poručnik Krsta Spasojev–Rakić.
  - 4th Cheta, of the 2nd Battalion.
- 3rd Battalion.
  - 1st Cheta, of the 3rd Battalion.
  - 2nd Cheta, of the 3rd Battalion.
  - 3rd Cheta, of the 3rd Battalion.
  - 4th Cheta, of the 3rd Battalion.
- 4th Battalion.
  - 1st Cheta, of the 4th Battalion.
  - 2nd Cheta, of the 4th Battalion.
  - 3rd Cheta, of the 4th Battalion.
  - 4th Cheta, of the 4th Battalion, under Jovan Prvanović.

Chetas

- 1st Cheta, under captain Dimić.
- 3rd Cheta, under captain Daskalović.
- 4th Cheta, under potpukovnik/poručnik Mihailo Gmizović.

=== Equipment ===
- 7mm Mauser rifles (3,522 pieces in November 1912).
- Maxim machine guns (4 pieces in November 1912).
- Revolvers (128 pieces in November 1912).
- Sabres (69 pieces in November 1912).
- Vasić hand-held bombs (of VTZ Kragujevac).
- Hidden daggers used by all sub-officers.

== Legacy ==
Monument to the Iron Regiment

Due to its legendary bravery, the regiment received the name "Iron Regiment" during the wars, which it is mostly known as.

The modern Serbian 3rd Army Brigade based in Niš, established in 2007, "continues the legacy" of the Iron Regiment, and adopted 7 October as the "Day of the 3rd Army Brigade".

In 2014, a museum exhibition was held in honour of the regiment at the Central Military Club in Belgrade.

A trade union established in 2018 in Prokuplje was named after the regiment (Sindikat Gvozdeni puk). A monument in Prokuplje was erected in honor of the regiment, in October 2018.

== Notable people ==
- Milivoje Stojanović, commander of the unit at Bregalnica
- Milunka Savić, Serbian war heroine
- Flora Sandes, British nurse turned Serbian volunteer

== See also ==
- First Balkan War order of battle: Serbian Army
- Structure of the Serbian Army during World War I

== Sources ==
- Dobričanin, Mirko S. (2012). Топлички Гвоздени пук "Књаз Михаило" [Toplica Iron Regiment]. Интерпрес.
- Lekić, Dragan R., ed. (2014). Други пешадијски пук "Књаз Михаило"–Гвоздени пук у Ослободилачким ратовима 1912–1918. године. Историјски архив Топлице - Прокупље.
  - Zečević, Ratko (2014). "У СРЕТНУ ЈЕСЕН 1912. ГОДИНЕ ОД ПРОКУПЉА ДО ГАЗИМЕСТАНА". In Lekić, Dragan R. (ed.). Други пешадијски пук "Књаз Михаило "–Гвоздени пук у Ослободилачким ратовима 1912–1918. године. Историјски архив Топлице - Прокупље. pp. 7–10.
  - Dobričanin, Mirko S. (2014). "МОБИЛИЗАЦИЈА СРПСКЕ ВОЈСКЕ И У ЊОЈ ТОПЛИЧКИ ГВОЗДЕНИ ПУК". In Lekić, Dragan R. (ed.). Други пешадијски пук "Књаз Михаило "–Гвоздени пук у Ослободилачким ратовима 1912–1918. године. Историјски архив Топлице - Прокупље. pp. 11–15.
  - Radonjić, Ivana (2014). "ГВОЗДЕНИ ПУК У КУМАНОВСКОЈ БИЦИ [The Iron Regiment in the Battle of Kumanovo]". In Lekić, Dragan R. (ed.). Други пешадијски пук "Књаз Михаило "–Гвоздени пук у Ослободилачким ратовима 1912–1918. године. Историјски архив Топлице - Прокупље. pp. 29–37.
  - Žarić, Darko (2014). "ГВОЗДЕНИ ПУК У БИЦИ ЗА ПРИЛЕП У РАТУ СА ТУРЦИМА 3-5. НОВЕМБРА 1912. ГОДИНЕ [The Iron Regiment in the Battle for Prilep]". In Lekić, Dragan R. (ed.). Други пешадијски пук "Књаз Михаило "–Гвоздени пук у Ослободилачким ратовима 1912–1918. године. Историјски архив Топлице - Прокупље. pp. 39–45.
  - Kostić, Radoje (2014). "ДРУГИ ПЕШАДИЈСКИ ПУК 1. ПОЗИВА „КЊАЗ МИХАИЛО" У БИЦИ ЗА БИТОЉ 16-19. НОВЕМБРА 1912". In Lekić, Dragan R. (ed.). Други пешадијски пук "Књаз Михаило "–Гвоздени пук у Ослободилачким ратовима 1912–1918. године. Историјски архив Топлице - Прокупље. pp. 49–.
- Stanojević, Saša (2018). "Drugi pešadijski "Gvozdeni" puk u srpskoj istoriografiji (sa odabranom bibliografijom)" [The Second Infantry „Iron" Regiment in Serbian Historiography (With Selected Bibliography)]. Toplički zbornik.
- Vlaisavljević, Marina (2012). "НИШКИ ЈУНАЦИ "ГВОЗДЕНОГ ПУКА"" [HEROES OF THE „IRON REGIMENT” FROM NIŠ] (PDF). Zbornik. 21. Narodni muzej Niš.
- Kostić, Radoje (2012). "ДРУГИ ПЕШАДИЈСКИ ПУК "КЊАЗА МИХАИЛА" НА БРЕГАЛНИЦИ 1913. ГОДИНЕ" [SECOND INFANTRY REGIMENT „KNJAZ MIHAILO” AT BREGALNICA IN 1913] (PDF). Zbornik. 21. Narodni muzej Niš.
- Stanisavljević, Živko (1952). Битољска операција 1912 [Bitola Operation 1912]. Београд.
