= Grigorije Božović =

Serbian writer and professor (1880–1945)

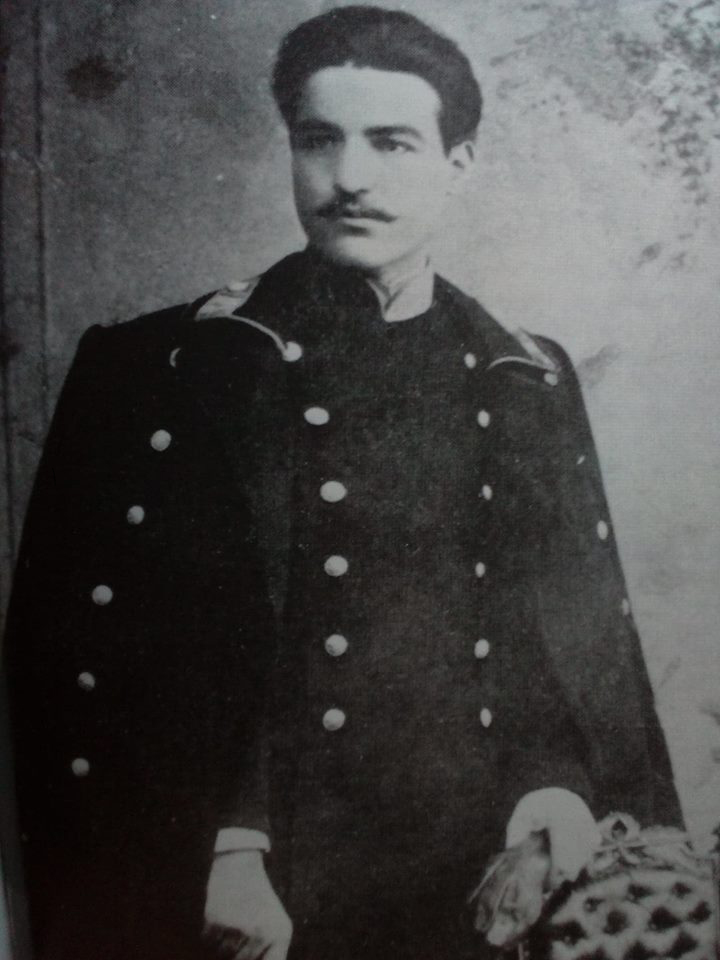
Bozhovich as a student at the Moscow Theological Academy

Grigorije Božović (Serbian Cyrillic: Григорије Божовић; 15 November 1880 Pridvorica, Ottoman Empire – 4 January 1945 in Belgrade, Kingdom of Yugoslavia), was a writer, professor of the Prizren seminary, one of the leaders of the Serbian movement in Macedonia, primarily in the Bitola Committee of the Serbian Chetnik organization, and then a member of the People's Assembly in Skopje. He played a leading role in political and national affairs at a time when Old Serbia was in conflict with the Turks and Arnauts just before the Balkan Wars, and later as a politician.

== Biography ==
Grigorije Božović was born in the village of Pridvorica near Ibarski Kolašin. He was nicknamed "Kolašinac" after his birthplace. His father Vukajlo Božović had been a Chetnik voivode during the wars for the liberation of Old Serbia in the early 20th century.

After studying in Prizren, Skopje, Constantinople and Moscow at the Theological Academy, he was appointed professor at the Theological Seminary in Prizren on September 30, 1905. In Prizren, he was also the district chief and president of a political municipality for some time. Grigorije married a teacher Vasilija, with whom he had a daughter Vukosava who later (1937) married artillery lieutenant Dragoljub Popović "the younger".

Božović was a member of the Assembly, and he was very much engaged in national work not only in Kosovo and Metohija but also in Macedonia. He acquired the status of a pensioner as an inspector of the Ministry of Social Policy. He was active in many associations, boards, and councils, known as a good speaker from the ranks of the opposition. At the assembly of the Belgrade Gajret "Osman Đikić" held in 1929, Grigorije was elected to his Board. He was elected in June 1933 at the congress in Banja Luka to the new National Defense Administration. In April 1934, King Aleksandar appointed him a member of the Patriarchal Council, headed by Serbian Patriarch Varnava. In the Association of Old Serbia, of which he was a member, he gave occasional lectures, such as the one from 1936 entitled "Roads in Southern Serbia then and now".

He was politically active in the Kingdom of Serbs, Croats, and Slovenes as a member of Pribićević's Independent Democratic Party, and was elected to parliament between 1924 and 1927. In the parliamentary elections of 1924, he stood as an independent democrat on a joint list with the Radicals in the Raška-Zvečan district. In 1926, Božović insulted the Albanian MP and diplomat Cena-beg in a newspaper article, for which he was sued in court by the Mayor of Belgrade. Božović also submitted to the assembly the disputable Interpellation against the appointment of Cena-beg as the ambassador of Albania in Belgrade. He stated that Cena-beg should not be a representative of his country, due to his previous activities towards Serbs, including a robbery of a monastery carried out by men loyal to him. When he ceased to be an MP in 1928, however, a lawsuit was initiated. In the meantime, the Albanian died, so it became pointless to discuss this "political issue" in court. The brother of the deceased, Sait Kriziu, tried to protect the reputation and honor of his relative in an open letter through the pages of the "Vreme" newspaper.

Under the presidency of Branislav Nušić, Božović was appointed a member of the state "Council of Experts in the Field of Copyright" from 1932. Together with other writers of the older and younger generation, in 1937 he founded the "Association of Writers Belgrade-Zagreb-Ljubljana", a class association obviously of a Yugoslav character. Before the first assembly, which was held in Belgrade in March of that year in the Skadarlija tavern "Kod dva jelena", the founding rules were signed by the Serbian side, namely Veljko Petrović, Božović and Siniša Paunović. Before the Second World War, Božović was elected president of the Belgrade Pen Club after the death of his predecessor, the poet Milan Rakić.

== Writer ==
Grigorije Božović is one of the most important Serbian interwar writers. He published fourteen books. Eight are collections of short stories; the rest are travelogues (short records about people and regions) later collected by Politika, of which he was a permanent and respected associate.

His first publication was the story "In a Land Without a Court" in 1905. He wrote an article for the patriotic-literary Serbian magazine Nova Iskra in the same year in Moscow, where he studied. Before the Second World War, the Student Home (boarding school) in Skopje had a student literary society named "Grigorije Božović" after its favorite Serbian writer.

The beginning of his work was marked by the collection "From Old Serbia" (1908) published by the Serbian Literary Gazette, and the end by Pripovetka (1940), published by the Serbian Literary Association. In 1935, he published Teška iskušenja, a collection of short stories, and in 1939, a short story collection entitled Pod zakon Along with a 1940 collection, they contain Božović's most valuable short stories. Božović's stories are thematically focused on Old Serbia, mostly on Kosovo and Metohija, partly on Macedonia, and on Bitola where he had served. The most important stories are "Strange undertones".

== Death ==
Just before the end of the war, the communists shot him in Belgrade. On January 4, 1945, Belgrade's Politika published the news that "Miloš Trivunac and Grigorije Bozović were sentenced to death." The military court of the Belgrade City Command sentenced him to the most severe punishment for the crime of treason since 1942, and he was shot on Christmas Eve 1945 in the basements of the prison in Đušina Street in Belgrade, the wartime Special Police headquarters.

== Rehabilitation and legacy ==
After Božović's execution, his literary work became almost completely unknown to the general public.

A request for [rehabilitation] was submitted in January 2008 by Božović's cousin Marinko, a full professor in the Faculty of Philosophy in Kosovska Mitrovica. In May, the Rehabilitation Department of the District Court in Belgrade issued its decision "adopting a request for the rehabilitation of Grigorije Božović, a prominent writer, national worker and reporter for Politika before the Second World War".

There was a publishing company by the name of "Grigorije Božović" in Priština before the Kosovo declaration of independence in 2008. A "Grigorije Božović" literary prize was established and awarded by the Cultural Center "Stari Kolašin" in Zubin Potok. The 2016 winner was Radovan Beli Marković for the novel "Putnikova ciglana". Another award of the same name is awarded by the Literary Society of Kosovo and Metohija. Its winner in 2016 was Sunčica Denić for the novel "The World Beyond", and in 2017 Aleksandar B. Laković for the novel “Kad kuće nismo zaključavali”.
