= Alimpije Marjanović =

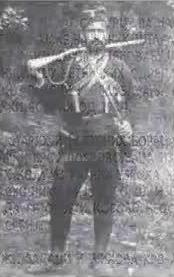
- Born: December 24, 1874 Donja Šatornja
- Died: March 15, 1940 (aged 65) Belgrade
- Battles / wars: Struggle for Macedonia; Balkan Wars; Great War

Alimpije Marjanović (Donja Šatornja, 24 December 1874 – Belgrade, 15 March 1940) was a Serbian revolutionary and commander who fought in the struggle for Macedonia, the Balkan Wars and the Great War. His military reputation is equal to Vojin Popović and Vojislav Tankosić as leading Chetniks in the Balkan Wars and World War I.

== Early life ==
He was born in Donja Šatornja. After his primary education, the family moved to Belgrade where Marjanović finished high school and entered the Military Academy. He rounded out his education in post-graduate studies in France's Saint Cyr Military Academy.

== Career ==
He spent 23 years in the army with 27 different services. He retired as a colonel.

In 1908, Major Marjanović served as the head of the eastern Povardarie's mountain headquarters as commander of all the Serbian bands in the vicinity of Preševo, Kumanovo, Kriva Palanka and Kratovo. He led the Serbian detachments with voivodes Spasa Garda, Živko Gvozdić, Ditko Aleksić, Vojislav Tankosić, Nikola Lukić-Skadarac and Denko Čuma. Following the successful action, he was given a nickname "Ovčepoljski" after the region (Ovče Polje) for reforming the Serbian Chetnik Organization of the Serbian Defense Force and linking Serbian armies and organizing villages of the Western and Eastern Povardarie across Ovče Pole. His work was nullified by the Young Turk revolution on 23 July 1908.

In the First Balkan War of 1912, Marjanović served as the head of the Chetnik Detachment Command in charge of Serbian border guards attached to the headquarters of the Supreme Command of the Regular Army and commander of the Chetnik Detachment in the district of Lisica. He was engaged in the mobilization, organization, and coordination of the chetas. In the Second Balkan War, he was the commander of a Serbian Army Brigade. He participated in the First World War, leading one of the most notable detachments -- Third Army detachments in Medveđa, Kuršumlija, Lukovo and Kolašin. He died on 15 March 1940 in Belgrade.

== Awards ==
- Three Karadjordje's stars, two fourth and one third degrees,
- Order of the White Eagle of the fifth degree
- Two Gold Medal for Courage
- Medal for Military Virtues
- Five monuments: Monument to King Peter, The Monument of the Serbian-Turkish War 1912, the Monument of the Serbian-Bulgarian War of 1913, the First World War Memorial 1914-1918, and the Albanian monument of 1917.

== See also ==
- List of Chetnik voivodes

== Sources ==
- Krakov, Stanislav (1990) [1930]. Plamen četništva (in Serbian). Belgrade: Hipnos.
- Trbić, Vasilije (1996). Memoari: 1898-1912 (in Serbian). Kultura. ISBN 9788678010132.
- Narodna enciklopedija Srpsko-hrvatsko-slovenačka, br. 1, 607.
