= Nikolje Rudničko Monastery =

Serbian Orthodox monastery in Donja Šatornja, Serbia

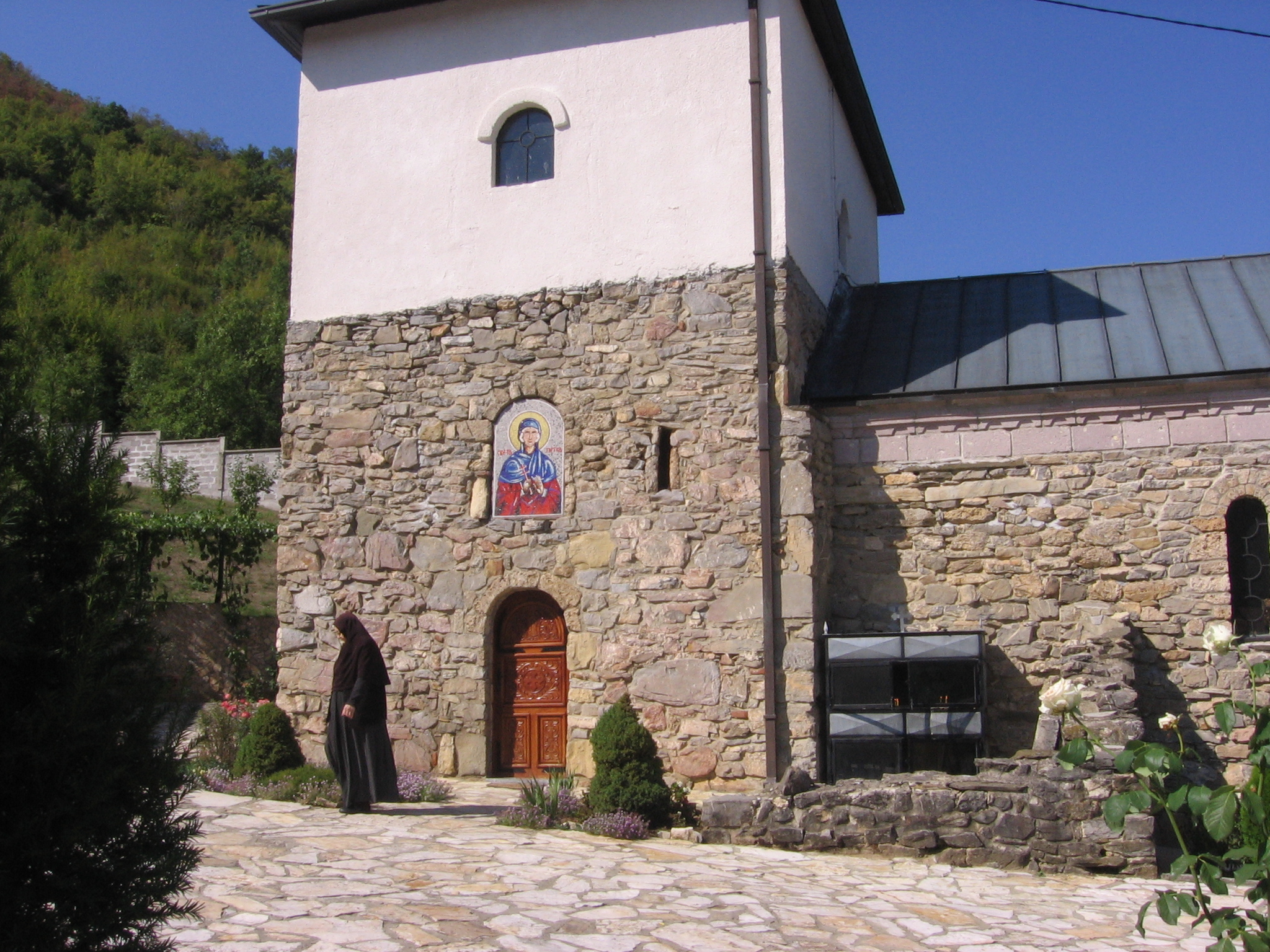
Nikolje Monastery

Nikolje Rudničko (Serbian Cyrillic: Никоље Рудничко) is a Serbian Orthodox monastery located in Donja Šatornja, 12 km away from Topola, Western Serbia.

== History ==
The monastery was founded by Nikola Dorjenović, a nobleman of despot Stefan Lazarević, in 1425.

Based on the records etched into the stone blocks on the north facade of the church (now plastered), it is concluded that in the second half of the fifteenth and early sixteenth century monastery had very developed monastic life. In the seventeenth century, when the monastery was reestablished again, there was a major renovation, therefore it is believed that before the renovation, the monastery was damaged and abandoned for a short period of time. In the eighteenth century, Nikolje was an important spiritual and cultural centre in its region. Joakim Vujić says that the Turks often burned and looted, but failed to destroy the monastery. In 1817 a monumental bell tower was built in the west part of the temple.

The reconstruction of the temple in 1850 performed painters Živko Pavlović and Ilija Stoicević. The iconographer Risto Nikolić painted the icons for the iconostasis.
