= Živan =

Živan (Cyrillic script: Живан) is a masculine given name of Slavic origin. The name may refer to:

- Živan Knežević (1906–1984), Yugoslav military officer
- Živan Ljukovčan (born 1954), Serbian football goalkeeper

== See also ==
- Živanović
