= Structure of the Serbian Army during World War I =

In World War I, the Royal Serbian Army was organized into armies (field armies), divisions, regiments, battalions, squadrons, batteries, detachments and chetas.

== Command ==
High Commander (Врховни командант)	regent Aleksandar Karađorđević
Chief-of-Staff (Начелник штаба Врховне команде)	vojvoda ("war-leader") Radomir Putnik, assistant (pomoćnik) general Živojin Mišić

== Organization ==
=== Oblasts ===
The Serbian Army recruited according to oblast (province) and okrug (district), so that families, friends and neighbours could fight together.

Oblast	Regiments	Okrug
Morava (Моравска) headquarters in Niš
Morava (Моравска) headquarters in Niš	1st Infantry Regiment (1. пешадијски пук–Милош Велики)	Vranje
Morava (Моравска) headquarters in Niš	2nd Infantry Regiment (2. пешадијски пук–Књаз Михаило)	Prokuplje
Morava (Моравска) headquarters in Niš	3rd Infantry Regiment (3. пешадијски пук)	Pirot
Morava (Моравска) headquarters in Niš	16th Infantry Regiment (16. пешадијски пук–Цар Николај II Романов)	Niš
Drina (Дринска) headquarters in Valjevo
Drina (Дринска) headquarters in Valjevo	4th Infantry Regiment (4. пешадијски пук–Стеван Немања)	Užice
Drina (Дринска) headquarters in Valjevo	5th Infantry Regiment (5. пешадијски пук–Краљ Милан)	Valjevo
Drina (Дринска) headquarters in Valjevo	6th Infantry Regiment (6. пешадијски пук–Престолонаследник Александар)	Šabac
Drina (Дринска) headquarters in Valjevo	17th Infantry Regiment (17. пешадијски пук)	Valjevo
Danube (Дунавска) headquarters in Belgrade
Danube (Дунавска) headquarters in Belgrade	7th Infantry Regiment (7. пешадијски пук–Краљ Петар)	Belgrade
Danube (Дунавска) headquarters in Belgrade	8th Infantry Regiment (8. пешадијски пук–Књаз Александар)	Požarevac
Danube (Дунавска) headquarters in Belgrade	9th Infantry Regiment (9. пешадијски пук–Краљ Никола I)	Požarevac
Danube (Дунавска) headquarters in Belgrade	18th Infantry Regiment (18. пешадијски пук–Краљевић Ђорђе)	Belgrade
Šumadija (Шумадијска) headquarters in Kragujevac
Šumadija (Шумадијска) headquarters in Kragujevac	10th Infantry Regiment (10. пешадијски пук–Таковски)	Čačak
Šumadija (Шумадијска) headquarters in Kragujevac	11th Infantry Regiment (11. пешадијски пук–Карађорђе)	Kragujevac
Šumadija (Шумадијска) headquarters in Kragujevac	12th Infantry Regiment (12. пешадијски пук–Цар Лазар)	Kruševac
Šumadija (Шумадијска) headquarters in Kragujevac	19th Infantry Regiment (19. пешадијски пук)	Kragujevac
Timok (Тимочка) headquarters in Zaječar
Timok (Тимочка) headquarters in Zaječar	13th Infantry Regiment (13. пешадијски пук–Хајдук Вељко)	Negotin
Timok (Тимочка) headquarters in Zaječar	14th Infantry Regiment (14. пешадијски пук)	Knjaževac
Timok (Тимочка) headquarters in Zaječar	15th Infantry Regiment (15. пешадијски пук–Стеван Синђелић)	Zaječar
Timok (Тимочка) headquarters in Zaječar	20th Infantry Regiment (20. пешадијски пук)	Zaječar
Ibar (Ибарска)	Unorganized	Unorganized
Kosovo (Косовска)	Unorganized	Unorganized
Vardar (Вардарска)	Organized during war	Unorganized
Bregalnica (Брегалничка)	Organized during war	Unorganized
Bitola (Битољска)	Some units organized during war	Unorganized

=== Divisions and Regiments ===
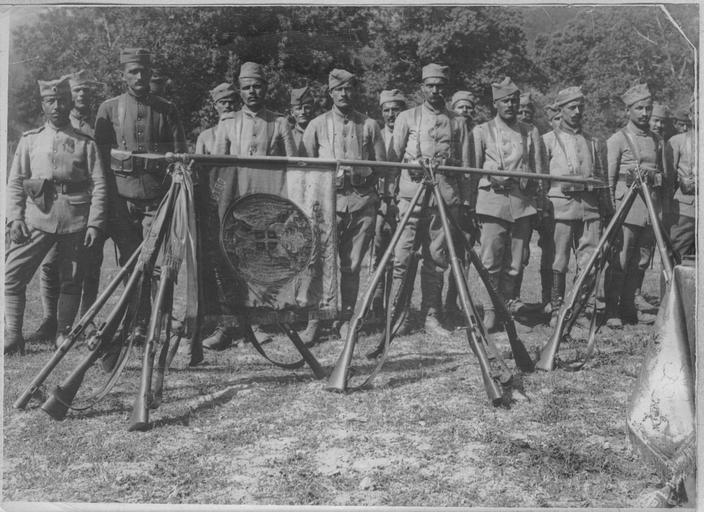
2nd Infantry Regiments, 1918

The Serbian Army was organized into divisions and larger detachments at the beginning of the war in the following:

- Morava Division I (Моравска дивизија I позива), with 1st, 2nd, 3rd and 16th Infantry Regiments (1st Call)
- Drina Division I (Дринска дивизија I позива), with 5th, 6th, 17th Infantry Regiments and 3rd Supernumerary Infantry Regiment (1st Call)
- Danube Division I (Дунавска дивизија I позива), with 7th, 8th, 18th Infantry Regiments and 4th Supernumerary Infantry Regiment (1st Call)
- Šumadija Division I (Шумадијска дивизија I позива), with 10th, 11th, 12th, 19th Infantry Regiments (1st Call)
- Timok Division I (Тимочка дивизија I позива), with 13th, 14th, 15th, 20th Infantry Regiments (1st Call)
- Combined Division (Комбинована дивизија), with 1st, 2nd, 5th and 6th Supernumerary Infantry Regiments (1st Call)
- Morava Division II (Моравска дивизија II позива), with 1st, 2nd, 3rd Infantry Regiments (2nd Call)
- Drina Division II (Дринска дивизија II позива), with 5th, 6th Infantry Regiments (2nd Call), 6th Infantry Regiment (3rd Call) with supernumerary battalion, and one battalion of the 5th Infantry Regiment (3rd Call)
- Danube Division II/Braničevo Detachment (Дунавска дивизија II позива, Браничевски одред), with 7th, 8th, 9th Infantry Regiment (2nd Call), 9th Infantry Regiment (1st Call), 8th, 9th Infantry Regiments (3rd Call)
- Šumadija Division II (Шумадијска дивизија II позива), 10th, 11th, 12th Infantry Regiment (2nd Call)
- Timok Division II (Тимочка дивизија II позива), 13th, 14th, 15th Infantry Regiments (2nd Call)
- Obrenovac Detachment (Обреновачки одред), 7th Infantry Regiment (2nd Call), two battalions of 5th Infantry Regiment (3rd Call)
- Užice Brigade (Ужичка бригада), 4th Infantry Regiment (2nd Call), 4th Infantry Regiment (3rd Call)
- Mokra Gora Detachment (Одред код Мокре Горе), 4th Infantry Regiment (1st Call)
- Lim Detachment (Лимски одред), 4th and 5th Cadre Regiment, one and a half battalion of 4th Infantry Regiment (3rd Call)

The mobilized were categorized into four age groups or classes, poziv (literally "call", also translated as "line"). The 1st Call (Први позив) being 21-31 years (deemed "active army", активна војска), 2nd Call (Други позив) 32-37 years, 3rd Call (Трећи позив) 38-45 years. The "Last Defence" (poslednja odbrana, Последња одбрана) was 18-20 and 46-55 years. The 1st and 2nd Calls were organized into the National Army, being the operative component in the Serbian Army, while the 3rd and Last Defence were used for garrison- and guard duty.

=== Cavalry, Artillery, Air Force ===
- Cavalry Division (Коњичка дивизија), made up of two brigades, each with two regiments.
  - 1st Cavalry Brigade, with Cavalry Regiments 1st, 3rd.
  - 2nd Cavalry Brigade, with Cavalry Regiments 2nd, 4th.
  - Cavalry Artillery Division.
- Artillery, organized into the Infantry Regiments and Cavalry Division, and the independent Highland Artillery Regiment with nine batteries.
- Air Force, two planes and one balloon, during war aided by a French squadron

=== Chetnik Detachments ===
The Serbian High Command ordered for the establishment of Chetnik detachments to also house volunteers, each detachment numbering 500–600 men.

- Zlatibor Chetnik Detachment (Златиборски четнички одред), under major Kosta Todorović
- Jadar Chetnik Detachment (Јадарски четнички одред), under major Vojin Popović
- Rudnik Chetnik Detachment (Руднички четнички одред), under major Vojislav Tankosić
- Gornjak Chetnik Detachment (Горњачки четнички одред), under major Velimir Vemić

== 1914 ==
=== First Army ===
General Petar Bojović, Commanding First Army

Colonel Božidar Terzić, Chief of Staff

Divisions	Regiments
Cavalry division: Colonel Branko Jovanović	1. cavalry regiment; 2. cavalry regiment; 3. cavalry regiment; 4. cavalry regiment
Timok division I ban: General Vladimir Kondić	13. inf.reg. I ban; 14. inf.reg. I ban; 15. inf.reg. I ban; 20. inf.reg. I ban
Timok division II ban:	13. inf.reg. II ban; 14. inf.reg. II ban; 15. inf.reg. II ban
Morava division II ban	1. inf.reg. II ban; 2. inf.reg. II ban; 3. inf.reg. II ban
Braničevo detachment (Dunav division II ban)	troops of Dunav division II ban: 7. inf.reg. II ban; 8. inf.reg. II ban; 9. inf.reg. II ban; other troops: 9. inf.reg. I ban; 8. inf.reg. III ban; 9. inf.reg. III ban
Army artillery Colonel Božidar Srećković	

=== Second Army ===
General Stepa Stepanović, Commanding Second Army

Colonel Vojislav Živanović, Chief of Staff

Divisions	Regiments
Morava division I ban Colonel Ilija Gojković	1.inf.reg. I ban; 2.inf.reg. I ban; 3.inf.reg. I ban; 16.inf.reg. I ban
Combined division I ban General Mihailo Rašić	1. supernumerary inf.reg. I ban Svetislav Mišković; 2. supernumerary inf.reg. I ban; 5. supernumerary inf.reg. I ban; 6. supernumerary inf.reg. I ban Dragoljub Uzunmirković
Šumadija division I ban	10. inf.reg. I ban; 11. inf.reg. I ban; 12. inf.reg. I ban; 19. inf.reg. I ban
Dunav division I ban Colonel Milivoje Anđelković	7. inf.reg. I ban; 8. inf.reg. I ban; 18. inf.reg. I ban; 4. supernumerary inf.reg. I ban
Yugoslav Division	
Army artillery Colonel Vojislav Milojević	

=== Third army ===
General Pavle Jurišić Šturm, Commanding Third Army

Colonel Dušan Pešić, Chief of Staff

Divisions and brigades	Regiments
Drina division I ban	5. inf.reg. I ban; 6. inf.reg. I ban; 17. inf.reg. I ban; 3. supernumerary inf.reg. I ban
Drina division II ban	5. inf.reg. II ban Miloje Jelisijević; 6. inf.reg. II ban; 6. inf.reg. III ban; 1 battalion of 5. inf.reg. III ban
Obrenovac detachment	7. inf.reg. III ban; 2 battalions of 5. inf.reg. III ban
other units:	Jadar četnik detachment
Army artillery: Colonel Miloš Mihailović	

=== Army group Užice ===
General Miloš Božanović

Divisions and brigades	Regiments
Šumadija division II ban Colonel Dragutin Milutinović	10. inf.reg. II ban; 11 inf.reg. II ban; 12. inf.reg. II ban; 4. inf.reg. I ban
Užice brigade Colonel Ivan Pavlović	4. inf.reg. II ban; 4. inf.reg. III ban
detachments:	Lim detachment LtColonel Jevrem Mihailović; Zlatibor četnik detachment Major Kosta Tododrović; Gornjak četnik detachment Major Velimir Vemić
Army artillery:	

== Sources ==
- Historical Museum of Serbia (2020). Србија 1914 [Serbia 1914] (PDF). Belgrade: Историјски музеј Србије, Војни музеј.
- Keegan, John (2011-08-31). The First World War. Random House. p. 166. ISBN 978-1-4070-6412-3.
- Price, W. H. Crawfurd (1918). Serbia's Part in the War ... Simpkin, Marshall, Hamilton, Kent & Company. (Public Domain)
