= Donja Šatornja =

- Village
- Location within Serbia
- Coordinates: 44°12′00″N 20°35′00″E
- Country: Serbia

Population (2022)
  - Total: 579
- Time zone: UTC+1 (CET)
  - Summer (DST): UTC+2 (CEST)

Donja Šatornja (Доња Шаторња) is a village located in Serbia. It has approximately 890 inhabitants and is located at 98 km from the capital of Serbia, Belgrade, in the municipality of Topola. As of 2022, the population is 579.

One of the most beautiful medieval monasteries of the Serbian Orthodox Church Nikolje is also located in Donja Šatornja. The center of the village has a wide variety of cafes and kafanas, traditional Serbian restaurants, which are the main tourist attraction of the region.
