= Krušce =

Coordinates: 43.3261°N 21.7764°E

- Village
- Interactive map of Krušce
- Country: Serbia
- District: Nišava District
- Municipality: Niš
- Time zone: UTC+1 (CET)
  - Summer (DST): UTC+2 (CEST)

Krušce is a village situated in Niš municipality in Serbia.
