= First Balkan War order of battle: Serbian Army =

The order of battle of the Serbian Army in the First Balkan War is a list of the Serbian units that fought the major campaigns against the Ottoman army from October 1912 to May 1913.

Apart from the infantry divisions of the Serbian army, one Bulgarian infantry division was also part of it.

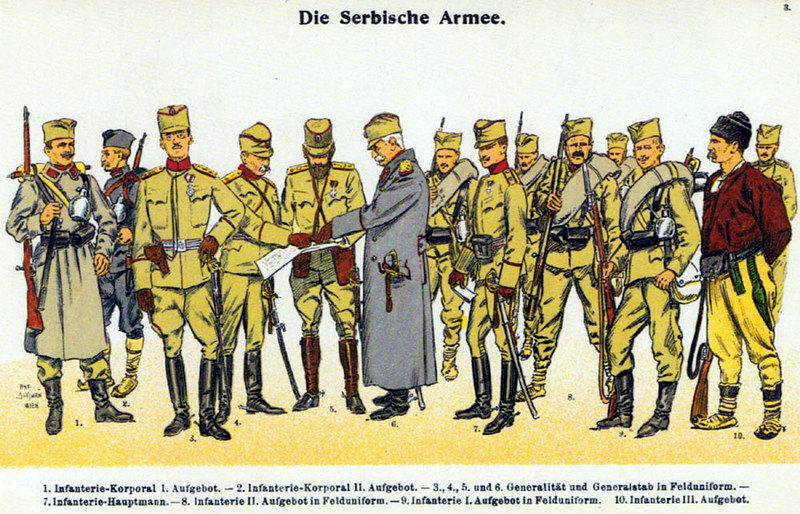
Field uniforms of the Serbian Army during the Balkan Wars

In the Royal Serbian Army, artillery and cavalry divisions (divizion) were units of battalion size not to be confused with the higher level of divisions (divizija) which had geographic names; The Serbian Army was divided into five divisional area: Morava, Drina, Dunav, Šumadija and Timok. Each of them was made up of 3 regional regimental commands with 4 battalion districts each. Each divisional area provided one first-call division, one second-call division, one or two cavalry squadrons and 6 station batteries.

== Order of battle ==
=== First Army ===
The First Army was under the command of Crown Prince Alexander Karađorđević. The Chief of Staff was Colonel Petar Bojović.

Divisions	Regiments and batteries
Cavalry Division: Prince Arsen Karađorđević	1st Cavalry Regiment "Miloš Obilić", commanded by Major Antonije Antić; 2nd Cavalry Regiment "Car Dušan", commanded by Major Vojin Čolak-Antić; 3rd Cavalry Regiment, commanded by Major Petar Savatić; 4th Cavalry Regiment "Konstantin Konstantinović", commanded by Major Jevrem Lazić; Cavalry Artillery Division ^{A}, commanded by Major Berislav/Borisav B. Todorović
Morava division I line: Col Ilija Gojković	1st Infantry Regiment (I line) Miloš Veliki - LtCol Dušan Tufegdžić; 2nd Infantry Regiment (I line) Knjaz Mihailo (nicknamed "The Iron Regiment") - LtCol Vlada Ristić; 3rd Infantry Regiment (I line) - LtCol Ivan Pavlović; 16th Infantry Regiment (I line) Car Nikolaj II - LtCol Jovan Viktorović; Morava Field Artillery Regiment (minus 9th battery attached to Morava brigade I line ) - LtCol Ljubomir Pokorni; 1st Mountain Battery ( detached from mountain artillery division ); Morava divisional cavalry regiment - Maj Velimir Vemić
Drina division I line: Col Pavle Jurišić Šturm	4th Infantry Regiment (I line) Stevan Nemanja - LtCol Dimitrije I. Dragutinović; 5th Infantry Regiment (I line) Kralj Milan - LtCol Jovan Vasić; 6th Infantry Regiment (I line) Prestolonaslednik Aleksandar - LtCol Đuro Dokić; 17th Infantry Regiment (I line) - LtCol Miladin Masalović; Drina field artillery regiment (9 batteries) - LtCol Božidar Srećković; Drina divisional cavalry regiment - Maj Mladen Lukićević
Danube division I line: Col Miloš Božanović	7th Infantry Regiment (I line) Kralj Petar I - LtCol A.Glišić; 8th Infantry Regiment (I line) Princ Aleksandar; 9th Infantry Regiment (I line) Kralj Nikola I - LtCol Panta Grujić; 18th Infantry Regiment (I line) Princ Đorđe - LtCol Mihailo Zisić; Danube field artillery regiment (9 batteries) - LtCol Svetozar Matić; Danube divisional cavalry regiment - Maj Nikola Colović
Danube division II line Col Mihailo Rašić	7th Infantry Regiment (II line); 8th Infantry Regiment (II line); 9th Infantry Regiment (II line); 4th Supernumerary Infantry Regiment (I line) - LtCol Radomir Aranđelović; Danube field artillery division (3 batteries); Danube divisional cavalry division ^{A}
Timok division II line Col Dragutin Milutinović	13th Infantry Regiment (II line) - LtCol Sava Dimitrijević; 14th Infantry Regiment (II line); 15th Infantry Regiment (II line); Timok field artillery division (3 batteries) - LtCol Obrad Jovanović; Timok divisional cavalry division
Army artillery	1st Howitzer Battery; 6th Mortar Battery; 1st, 2nd & 3rd Heavy Batteries 120mm

=== Second Army ===
Commander: General Stepa Stepanović

Divisions	Regiments and batteries
Timok Division I line Col Vladimir Kondić	13th Infantry Regiment (I line) Hajduk Veljko - LtCol Miloš Stanković; 14th Infantry Regiment (I line) - LtCol Kosta Knežević; 15th Infantry Regiment (I line) Stevan Sinđelić; 20th Infantry Regiment (I line) - LtCol Jovan Ugrinović; Timok field artillery regiment (9 batteries); Timok divisional cavalry regiment - Maj Petar Živković
VII ( Rila ) division ( Bulgarian ) MG Todorov	I brigade; II brigade; III brigade
Army Artillery	1st division of mountain artillery regiment ( minus 1st battery attached to Morava division 1 line); 2nd howitzer battery

=== Third Army ===
Commander: General Božidar Janković

Divisions and brigades	Regiments and batteries
Šumadija Division I line: Col Đorđe Mihailović	10th Infantry Regiment (I line); 11th Infantry Regiment (I line); 12th Infantry Regiment (I line) - LtCol Milivoje Stojanović; 19th Infantry Regiment (I line); Šumadija field artillery regiment ( 9 batteries ); Šumadija divisional cavalry division
Morava Division II line: Col Milovan Nedić	1st Infantry Regiment (II line); 2nd Infantry Regiment (II line) - LtCol Dušan Vasić; 3rd Infantry Regiment (II line); Morava field artillery division ( 3 batteries ); Morava divisional cavalry division
Drina division II line: Col Pavle Paunović	5th Infantry Regiment (II line); 6th Infantry Regiment (II line); Drina field artillery division (minus 3rd battery attached to Javor brigade); Drina divisional cavalry division
Morava brigade I line: LtCol Stevan Milovanović	1st Supernumerary Infantry Regiment (I line) - LtCol Živojin Bacić; 2nd Supernumerary Infantry Regiment (I line); 9th battery (detached from Morava field artillery regiment); cavalry division
Army cavalry:	two squadrons of cavalry
Army artillery:	2nd mountain artillery division; 3rd mountain artillery division; 3rd howitzer battery; 4th howitzer battery; 4th heavy battery 120 mm
Chetnik detachments Maj. Alimpije Marjanovic	Medveđa; Kuršumlija; Lukovo; Kolašin

=== Army of Ibar ===
Commander: General Mihailo Živković

Divisions	Regiments and batteries
Šumadija division II line Col Mihailo Janković	10th Infantry Regiment (II line); 11th Infantry Regimant (II line); 12th Infantry Regimant (II line); Šumadija field artillery division; Šumadija divisional cavalry division
Other units	5th Supernumerary Infantry Regiment; 1st mountain artillery division ( II line ); 5th howitzer battery; 5th heavy battery 120 mm

=== Javor brigade ===
Commander: Colonel Milivoje Anđelković

- 3rd Supernumerary Infantry Regiment ( I line )
- 4th Infantry Regiment (II line) - LtCol Vilotije Marković
- 3rd battery ( detached from Drina divisional artillery division )
- 4th mountain battery (II line)
- 1st Užice position battery
- 6th heavy battery 120 mm
- cavalry squadron

== See also ==
- Order of battle of the Serbian Army (1876–1878)
- Structure of the Serbian Army during World War I

== Literature ==
- Belgrade (Serbia) Istoriski institut Jugoslovenske narodne armije (1975). The First Balkan War, 1912-1913: Serbian Army Operations (in Serbian).
- Savo Skoko; Petar Opačić (1974). Vojvoda Stepa Stepanović in the wars of Serbia: 1876-1918 (in Serbian). Beogradski izdavačko-grafički zavod.
- Borislav Ratkovic. Mobilization of the Serbian Army for the First Balkan War, October 1912. Kiraly and Djordjevic, East Central Europe.
- Rudić, Srđan; Milkić, Miljan (2013). Balkanski ratovi 1912-1913: Nova viđenja i tumačenja [The Balkan Wars 1912/1913: New Viеws and Interpretations]. Istorijski institut & Institut za strategijska istrazivanja. ISBN 978-86-7743-103-7.
