= Krstec, Prilep =

Krstec Крстец
- Village
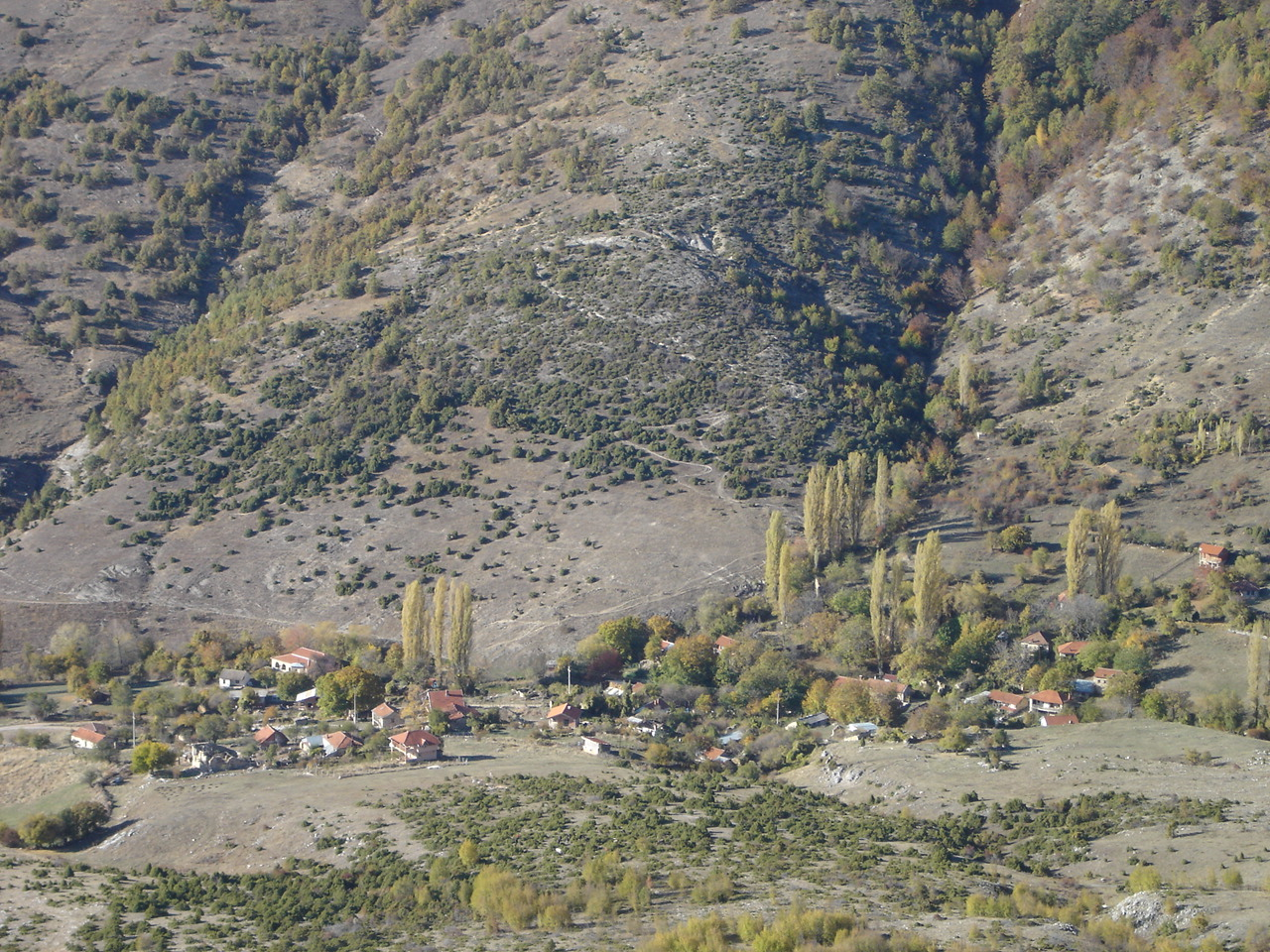
- Krstec, Macedonia

- Location within North Macedonia
- Country: North Macedonia
- Region: Pelagonia
- Municipality: Prilep
- Elevation: 1,362 m (4,469 ft)

Population (2021)
  - Total: 0
- Time zone: UTC+1 (CET)
- Area code: +389/48/4XXXXX

Krstec is a village in Municipality of Prilep, North Macedonia. Krstec is the highest settlement of the municipality.

== Demographics ==
According to the 2002 census, the village had a total of 1 inhabitants. Ethnic groups in the village include:

- Macedonians 1
