= Lalince =

Lalince Лалинце (Serbian)
- Village (Selo)
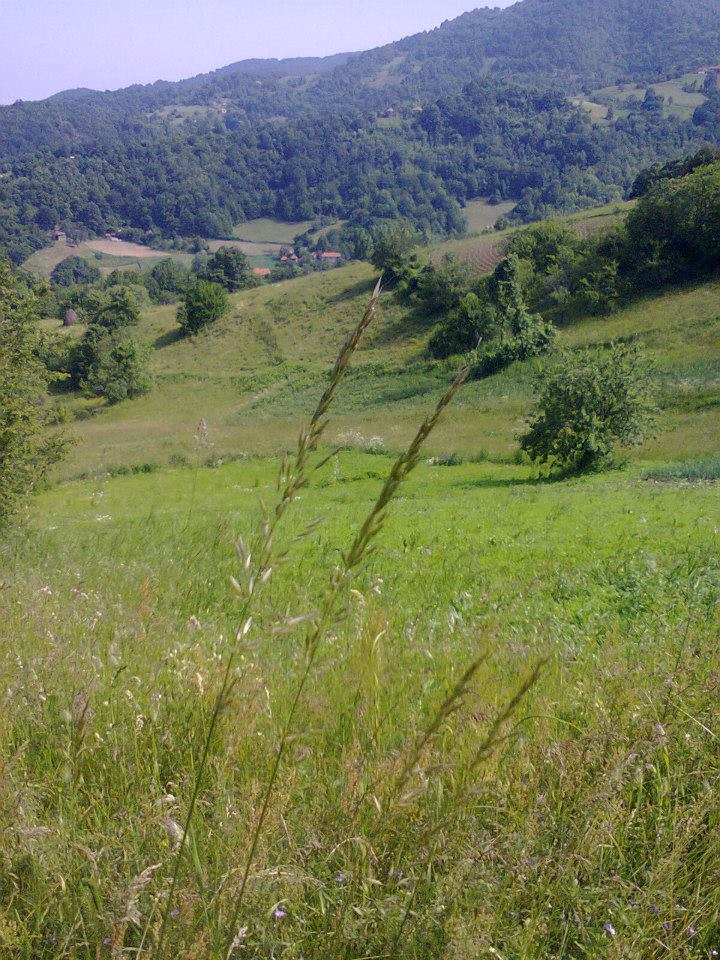

- Location within Serbia
- Coordinates: 42°45′45″N 21°50′4″E
- Country: Serbia
- Region: Southern and Eastern Serbia
- District: Pčinja
- Municipality: Vranje

Population (2002)
  - Total: 150
- Time zone: UTC+1 (CET)
  - Summer (DST): UTC+2 (CEST)

Lalince is a village in the municipality of Vranje, Serbia. According to the 2002 census, the village has a population of 150 people.
