= Lukovo, Struga =

Lukovo Луково
- Village
- Location within North Macedonia
- Country: North Macedonia
- Region: Southwestern
- Municipality: Struga

Population (2002)
  - Total: 447
- Time zone: UTC+1 (CET)
  - Summer (DST): UTC+2 (CEST)
- Car plates: SU
- Website: .

Lukovo is a village in Struga Municipality, in North Macedonia. It was a seat of Lukovo Municipality until 2004.

== History ==
Latinski Dabje is the name of a nearby mountain in Lukovo. It takes its name from Latini which in the Middle Ages was used by Slavic and Aromanian Orthodox communities to refer to Catholic Albanians. The presence of the toponym suggests either direct linguistic contact with Albanians or the former presence of Catholic Albanians in the area of Lukovo.

Lukovo is attested in the Ottoman defter of 1467 as a village in the timar of Saadi Hoca in the vilayet of Dulgoberda. The settlement had a total of 11 households and the anthroponymy recorded depicts a predominantly Slavic character, although Albanian personal names are also attested (e.g., Gjergj Brateshi), alluding to Albanian-Slavic cohabitation or symbiosis. A certain Todec from Çermenika appears among the household heads. Lukovo is again recorded in the Ottoman defter of 1583 as a village in the vilayet of Dulgobrda. The settlement had a total of 71 households with the anthroponymy attested being mostly Slavic in character, with a minority of Albanian anthroponyms also appearing, alongside instances of Slavicisation (e.g., Petko Gjergji, Dimitri Palkop, Malan Nikolla, Gjon Velko, Volçko Bursan-i etc.).

== Demographics ==
According to the 2002 census, the village had a total of 447 inhabitants. Ethnic groups in the village include:

- Macedonians 444
- Serbs 1
- Others 2
