= Vojislav Živanović =

Serbian general (1870-1932)

Vojislav Živanović Војислав Живановић
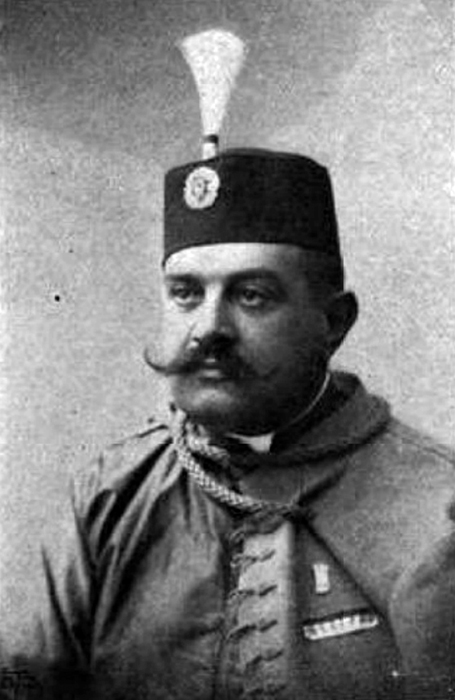
- Born: 26 January 1870; Kragujevac, Šumadija District, Serbia
- Died: 17 February 1932 (aged 62); Ćuprija, Morava Banovina, Yugoslavia
- Alma mater: Military Academy
- Spouse: Ruska Bajloni (m. 1896)
- Military career
- Allegiance: Serbia; Yugoslavia
- Branch: Royal Serbian Army; Royal Yugoslav Army
- Service years: 1887–1918
- Rank: Diviziski general
- Commands: Timočki Division
- Conflicts: First Balkan War; Second Balkan War; World War I

Vojislav Živanović (Serbian: Војислав Живановић), was a Serbian and Yugoslav divisional general throughout the early 20th century. He served in the First Balkan War, the Second Balkan War and World War I, known for commanding the Timočki Division and a recipient of the Order of Karađorđe's Star.

== Early and education ==
Vojislav was born on 26 January 1870 in Kragujevac, the son of Mata Živanović who was a merchant hailing from Luznica. He spent a majority of his childhood in his father's village and attended elementary school there. He would finish the rest of his elementary and high school life in Kragujevac and entered the Military Academy on 1 September 1887, within the 20th Class.

== Early military career ==
He was promoted to lieutenant of artillery on 14 September 1890, and in 1896 he married Ruska Bajloni, who was from a family of industrialists of Czech origin. Živanović also had close ties with the conspirators of the May Coup as he was Captain at the time of the plot. In 1905, together with other officers of engineering and artillery, published the military magazine "ARTILLERY-ENGINEERING GAZETTE A LETTER FOR OFFICERS OF ALL TYPES OF WEAPONS AND PROFESSIONS" and was then made a member of the General Staff on 20 May 1905. From 1907 to 1912, he began teaching general staff training at the Military Academy.

== Influence in Sokol ==
Around this time, he was also a member of a society known as the "Beogradski soko". Colonel Milutin Mišković proposed to unite all Serbian knightly associations. The proposition became initially successful as the "Union of Serbian Knights" was founded on 21 February 1909, which was led by the President of the Board of Directors, Emerich Steinlechner. After two months of serving as president, he stepped down in favor of Colonel Mišković. Despite the founding of the Society, not all chivalric societies joined the Union which resulted in Mišković sending out invitations and appeals to the conference in Kragujevac on 25 and 26 October 1909. Due to the Bosnian Crisis, the "Dušan Silni" and "Association of Serbian Sokols" united on 8 November 1909.

On 1908, the heir to the throne Đorđe Karađorđević worked on the unification of the two Sokol societies. Karađorđević served as the patron of knightly societies as well as the Czech lawyer Dr. Jozef Eugen Šajner who served as the head of the Czech Sokol Association since 1904, the Svaz Slovanského sokolstva and the Narodna Odbrana. All organizations would then unify on 2 February 1910, when the board of directors elected President Stevan Todorović and Vice President Živanović.

== Balkan Wars and World War I ==
By the time the First Balkan War and the Second Balkan War broke out, he served as the chief of staff of the Second Army and was promoted to colonel in January 1913. During World War I, he commanded the Timočki Division, which stood out during the Battle of Kolubara near Lazarevac from 16 to 18 November 1914. He would then command the regiment during the battles against the Austro-Hungarian 7th Division which took Kosmaj in a counterattack and pursued parts of the 5th Army towards Belgrade on December 8.

During the fronts in Corfu and Thessaloniki, he was the chief of staff of the 2nd Army and then the commander of the Yugoslav Division. Upon his retirement in 1918, he gave a speech about the experiences he had throughout World War I and his personal feelings about the regiment. He concluded the speech with:

In parting, I recommend you to continue to be brave and to most conscientiously support and carry out the orders of your new division commander and to testify to the good opinion I gave about you by presenting you as worthy descendants of Hajduk Veljko and Stevan Sinđelić. Remember that most of our troubles are over, our enemies are no longer as mighty and strong as they were before. It remains for us to exert our forces one more time, and to crush the enemy together with our allies. Only by trusting in God and full trust in our glorious Commander-in-Chief. Long live our Commander-in-Chief, His Royal Highness, Crown Prince Alexander. Goodbye Timočani!

He was also a recipient Order of Karađorđe's Star with swords.
