= Božin Simić =

Božin Simić (1881–1966) was a veteran of the struggle for Macedonia and Old Serbia, member of the Black Hand, a volunteer in the Balkan Wars and World War I, and prior to World War II became a Communist spy, a traitor to the Kingdom of Yugoslavia.

== Biography ==
Born on 20 October 1881, in the village of Veliki Siljegovac near Kruševac. His parents were teachers. Simić graduated from the Military Academy in Belgrade and took an active part in the May Coup in 1903. From 1911 he was the supervising officer of the Vranje border region and the Ottoman Empire. He was a liaison officer in touch with Chetnik Voivode Vojislav Tankosić in Macedonia with the task of transferring arms and men across the border to Turkish-occupied territory. In August 1912, he joined a secret society called the Black Hand.

During the First World War, he was a company commander. In 1916 he travelled to Imperial Russia, wherein Odessa he was in charge of recruiting soldiers for the Serbian army from the Austro-Hungarian prisoners and taking part in the establishment of the First Serbian Volunteer Division. In the Salonika trial of Black Hand participants in the May Coup, Simić was sentenced to 18 years in prison in absentia, which is why he remained in Russia and after the October Revolution where he became a Colonel in the Red Army. He remained in Russia until 1936 when he returned to the Kingdom of Yugoslavia. There he was arrested at the border, questioned, but managed to convince the authorities that he was not a spy, he was released from detention after two days. He was given back the rank of colonel which was taken away from him at the Salonika trial in 1917.

Simić was in touch with General Dušan Simović, with whom he met on 26 March, the day before the Yugoslav coup d'état took place, and informed him about the Soviet Union's mood to conclude an agreement with Yugoslavia. In the Government of Dušan Simović, he was appointed minister without portfolio. As a minister without portfolio, he and Dušan Simović participated in negotiations with Stalin, and immediately after the military coup d'état on 27 March 1941, Mustafa Golubić, the senior NKVD officer and Božin Simić travelled together from Belgrade to Moscow to attend the signing of the Yugoslav-Soviet Union Friendship Agreement. German forces invaded the country ten days later.

During the Second World War, Božin Simić, as Minister of the Government-in-exile in London, opposed the bombing of Belgrade by the Allies, because in Serbia a movement of resistance to the occupying forces was afoot from the start, for example, not bombing Bulgaria, which has openly shifted to the side of the axis force. After that, Sofia was bombed for several days. Because of this stance in 1946, on his way to Ankara to take over the position of Tito's first ambassador there, an attempted assassination was made by a Bulgarian agent, but he survived.

He died on 24 February 1966, in Belgrade. He was 84.
