= Pavle Blažarić =

Serbian officer and Chetnik leader (1878–1947)

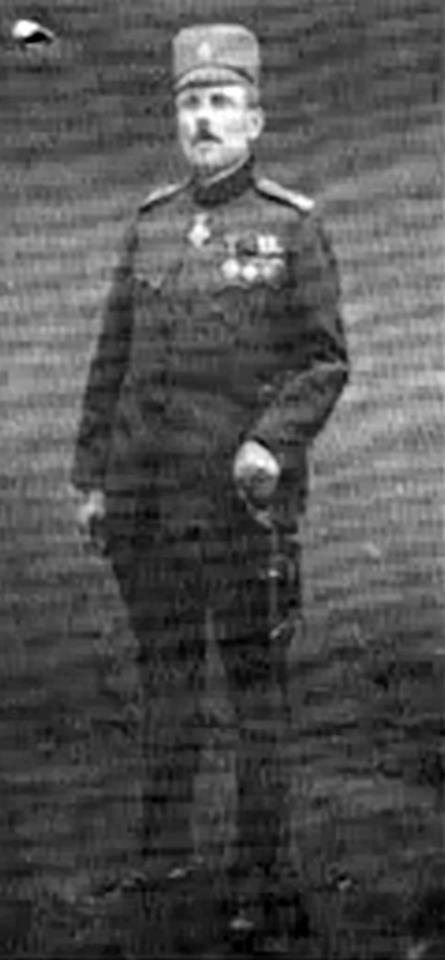
- Portrait of Blažarić
- Born: 26 January 1878; Jarinje, Kingdom of Serbia
- Died: 6 May 1947 (aged 69); Jarinje, Yugoslavia
- Occupations: military officer, Chetnik leader

Pavle Blažarić, also known as Pavle Blažarić-Bistrički (26 January 1878 – 6 May 1947), was a Serbian officer and Chetnik leader in Old Serbia from the time of the struggle for Macedonia in the early 20th century right up until the end of World War II.

== Biography ==
He finished elementary school in Raška and the gymnasium in Kruševac and the Military Academy in Belgrade. He enrolled in the 31st class of the Military Academy in 1898 and graduated in 1900. His classmate was Nikodija Lunjevica, brother of Queen Draga Obrenović. After graduating from the academy, he served in the 10th Takovo Regiment in Gornji Milanovac. From 1903 he served in the 18th Infantry Regiment in Belgrade. He participated in the May Coup in 1903. In 1905 he graduated from the prestigious Military Medical Academy in Belgrade. From 1905 he held the post of staff sergeant of the 14th Infantry Regiment in Knjazevac.

== Chetnik commander ==
In Povardarie, in late July 1906, lieutenant Pavle Blažarić-Bistrički was named the head of the mountain headquarters in Poreč replacing Nikola Janković-Kosovski and Panta Radosavljević-Dunavski. By September of that year, his men entered the villages of the Veles and Čaška regions—Oreš, Papradište, Čaška, Dolnjane, Nežilovo, and Teovo—and immediately established law and order. The invaders withdrew from there. Because of tuberculosis that he contracted while in active Chetnik service, he was recalled to Serbia in the spring of 1907. Upon his return to Serbia, he was appointed as the leader of the border troops in Kuršumlija.

== Liberation wars ==
In the First Balkan War, Blažarić was the commander of the Lukovo Chetnik Detachment which liberated the Christian population of Pristina from the Ottoman Turks in 1912. In the Second Balkan War, he was the commander of the Third Volunteer Brigade (Dobrovoljačka Brigada). In the Great War, he was appointed the commander of the 3rd Border Section with the task of preventing Albanian Kachaks and Bulgarian Komitadji (sponsored by IMRO/VMRO) from entering Serbia. He then joined the Serbian army's retreat through Albania from late 1915 to 1916 and participated in the fighting on the Salonika front. After the wars, he carried out various military duties as head of the Prizren Military District until 1926, when he took his retirement.

He also wrote a memoir about his experiences in the Second Balkan War. He gave "valuable data regarding the mood of the Serbian and Bulgarian army, commanders of individual units, soldiers on both sides." And in them he admits that the local population in the town of Kavadarci in Vardar Macedonia and its surroundings offered mass armed resistance to the Serbian troops and assisted in one way or another the Bulgarian units fighting against them. He held King Peter I of Serbia in high esteem.

In World War II he was tasked with evacuating retired officers from the Kingdom of Yugoslavia to Thessaloniki. He was imprisoned by the Germans but was released from prison in 1942 when he got too ill.

He died in Jarinje in 1947.

== See also ==
- List of Chetnik voivodes
