= Milorad Gođevac =

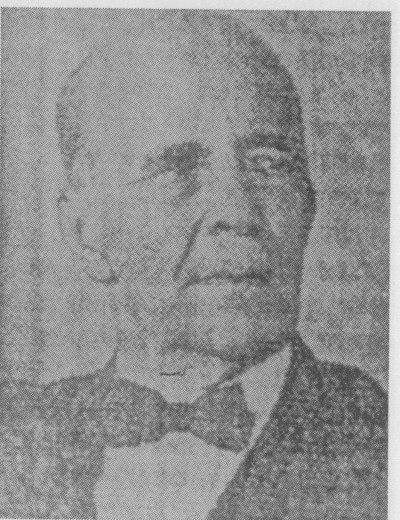
Gođevac at old age.

Milorad Gođevac (Serbian Cyrillic: Милорад Гођевац, 1 March 1860 – 21 September 1933) was the organizer of the Serbian Chetnik Organization, a medical doctor by profession.

== Life ==
Born in Valjevo, Principality of Serbia, he finished the First Belgrade Gymnasium and finished medicine at the University of Vienna in 1889. He was the organizer of the Serbian armed action in South Serbia and Macedonia and founder of the first Volunteer Board.

The Chief Staff of the Chetnik Organization (the Serbian Committee) was established in 1902. The members were, among others, Gođevac, Jovan Atanacković (president of the Central Board of Belgrade), Ljubomir Davidović, Ljubomir Jovanović, Jaša Prodanović, Dimitrije Ćirković, Luka Ćelović, Golub Janić, Nikola Spasić, and Milutin Stepanović. Shortly thereafter, the Central Board of Vranje (with Žika Rafailović), the Central Board of Skopje (with Vasa Jovanović) and the Central Board of Bitola (with Jovan Ćirković) were founded. With them were many other member-founders, namely Ljuba Kovačević, Velimir Karić, Ljuba Čupa, Petar Pešić, Lazar Kujundžić, Savatije Milošević, and others.

== See also ==
- Serb revolutionary organizations
- List of Chetnik voivodes
