= Serbian Chetnik Organization =

Serbian revolutionary organization in the Ottoman Empire

- Српска четничка организација (Serbian)
- Disbanded: Detachments organized into the Serbian Army; Chetniks in the Balkan Wars
- Type: Paramilitary
- Role: Guerrilla warfare HUMINT; Raiding; Reconnaissance; Tracking
- Nicknames: Chetniks: "Long live freedom" (Живела слобода / Živela sloboda); "With faith in God" (С вером у Бога / S verom u Boga)

Commanders
- Notable commanders: Jovan Babunski; Gligor Sokolović; Kosta Pećanac; Ilija Trifunović-Birčanin; Vojin Popović

The Serbian Revolutionary Organization (Serbian: Српска револуционарна организација, romanized: Srpska revolucionarna organizacija) or Serbian Chetnik Organization (Српска четничка организација, Srpska četnička organizacija) was a paramilitary revolutionary organization with the aim of liberation of Old Serbia (Kosovo and Macedonia) from the Ottoman Empire (in the vilayets of Kosovo, Manastir and Salonika).

Its Central Committee (Централни одбор, Centralni odbor) was established in 1902, while the Serbian Committee (Српски комитет, Srpski komitet) was established in September 1903 in Belgrade, by the combined Central Boards of Belgrade, Vranje, Skopje, and Bitola. Its armed wing was activated in 1904. Among the architects were members of the Saint Sava society, Army Staff and Ministry of Foreign Affairs. It operated during the Struggle for Macedonia, a series of social, political, cultural, and military conflicts in the region of Macedonia; its operations are known as Serb Action in Macedonia (Српска акција у Македонији, Srpska akcija u Makedoniji).

Coincidentally, the Circle of Serbian Sisters or Kolo Srpskih Sestara, was also being formed in Belgrade in 1903. Although known for its charitable work, the Circle also helped the Chetnik Organization in the Ottoman-held territories of Kosovo and Macedonia by sending food and medical supplies, doctors, and nurses to aid the wounded and stricken as the Kosovo Maiden did in Medieval Serbia.

The Chetnik central committee had initially funded individual and small groups of hajduks (brigands), who were either self-organized or part of the Bulgarian revolutionary organizations in Macedonia (Supreme Macedonian-Adrianople Committee or Internal Macedonian Revolutionary Organization). These sought to protect the Slavic Christian population from zulum (atrocities, persecution). With the failed negotiations of a joint Serbian-Bulgarian action and growing nationalism within the Bulgarian committees, the Serbian committee decided to fully organize their own armed groups. The Central Committee sent the first two bands into Macedonia in 1904, which were exposed early and destroyed. The second wave proved more successful; however, hostility between the Bulgarian and Serbian committees began. Serb Chetniks thus fought the Ottomans, and Bulgarian and Albanian bands. Prominent guerrilla fighters include Jovan Babunski, Gligor Sokolović, Ilija Trifunović-Birčanin, Mihailo Ristić-Džervinac, Jovan Grković-Gapon, Vasilije Trbić, Garda Spasa, Borivoje Jovanović-Brana, Ilija Jovanović-Pčinjski, Jovan Stanojković-Dovezenski, Micko Krstić, Lazar Kujundžić, Cene Marković, Miša Aleksić-Marinko, Doksim Mihailović, Kosta Milovanović-Pećanac, Vojin Popović-Vuk, Savatije Milošević and Petko Ilić. After the proclamation of the Young Turk revolution in 1908 and the proclamation of the constitution, all of the brigands in Macedonia, including the Serbian Chetniks, put down their weapons; however, guerilla fighting soon continued, later merging into the Balkan Wars.

== Background ==
The Serbian–Ottoman War (1876–1878) and Russo-Turkish War (1877–1878) against the Ottomans motivated liberation movements among the people in Kosovo and Metohija and Macedonia (known at the time as "Old Serbia" or "southern Serbia"). Serbia sought to liberate the Kosovo Vilayet (sanjaks of Niš, Prizren, Skopje and Novi Pazar). The Serbian Army was joined by southern Serbs who made up special volunteer detachments, a large number being from Macedonia, who wanted to liberate their home regions and unify them with Serbia. These volunteers were infiltrated into the Kumanovo and Kriva Palanka districts. When peace was signed between the Serbs and Ottomans, these groups conducted independent guerrilla fighting under the Serbian flag, which they carried and flew far south of the demarcation line. The Serbian advance in Old Serbia (1877–78) was followed with uprisings for the Serbian cause in the region, including a notable one that broke out in the counties of Kumanovo, Kriva Palanka, and Kratovo. On 20 January, the Kumanovo Uprising broke out, spanning four months and ending with Ottoman suppression. The Ottomans retaliated against the Serb population in the Ottoman Empire. Because of the terror against the unprotected rayah (lower class, Christians), many left for the mountains, fled across the border into Serbia, from where they raided their home regions to revenge the atrocities carried out by the Ottomans.

After the war, the Serbian military government sent armament and aid to rebels in Kosovo and Macedonia. Christian rebel bands were formed all over the region. Many of those bands, privately funded and aided by the government, were established in Serbia and crossed into Ottoman territory. In that way, Micko Krstić formed a rebel band in 1879 in Niš, with the help of Nikola Rašić and the military government in Vranje. On 14 October 1880, an uprising broke out in the Kičevo-Poreče region, known as the "Brsjak Revolt". Serbia secretly and very carefully aided the Christians in the Ottoman areas, such as in the Brsjak Revolt; however, by 1881, the aid was stopped by the intervention of the government. The Ottoman army succeeded in suppressing the rebellion in the winter of 1880–81, and many of the leaders were exiled.

In 1886, the Association of Serbo-Macedonians was established.

== Prelude ==
The anti-Serb organization Society Against Serbs, established by Dame Gruev in 1897, had up until 1902 murdered at least 43 persons, and wounded 52 persons, who were owners of Serbian schools, teachers, Serbian Orthodox clergy, and other notable Serbs in the Ottoman Empire.

In May 1899, Golub Janić sent a detachment of 10 to 15 men to Macedonia.

== Organization ==
Serbian Chetnik Organization
- Successor: Chetniks
- Formation: 1902—September 1903
- Type: Revolutionary organization
- Purpose: Liberation of Old Serbia and Macedonia from the Ottoman Empire
- Locations: Kingdom of Serbia; Ottoman Macedonia; Ottoman Kosovo
- Key people: Dr. Milorad Gođevac; Vasa Jovanović; Žika Rafajlović; Luka Ćelović; Gen. Jovan Atanacković
- Main organ: Central Committee (Serbian Committee)
- Affiliations: Society of Saint Sava; Army Staff (unofficially); Ministry of Foreign Affairs (unofficially)
- Budget: 50,000 dinars (1903)

The Central Committee (of Belgrade) was established in 1902 by Milorad Gođevac, Luka Ćelović, Vasa Jovanović, Žika Rafajlović, Nikola Spasić and Ljuba Kovačević. Captain Rafajlović had up until then independently organized armed bands in Old Serbia. The seat of the board was in the house of Ćelović. The organization was initially funded by Ćelović who donated 50,000 dinars yearly, which at that time was a very large sum. The Committee chose Dr. Gođevac as President. It had initially funded individual, and small groups of hajduks (brigands), who were either self-organized or part of the Bulgarian revolutionary organizations in Macedonia (Supreme Macedonian-Adrianople Committee or Internal Macedonian Revolutionary Organization).

The Serbian Committee (Српски комитет) was established in September 1903 in Belgrade, by the combined Central Boards of Belgrade, Vranje, Skopje and Bitola. The fighters sought to protect the Slavic Christian population from zulum (atrocities, persecution), and carried out assassinations of known persecutors. With the failed negotiations of a joint Serbian-Bulgarian action, and growing nationalism within the Bulgarian committees, the Serbian committee decided to fully organize their own armed groups. It's armed wing was thus officially activated in 1904. Among the architects were members of the Society of Saint Sava, Army Staff and Ministry of Foreign Affairs.

In the beginning, and also at times at the end, the Serbian Chetniks had strict orders of defence and protection, and not any offensive; The Ottoman government and the Great Powers agreed that the Chetniks did not carry out crimes and massacres, though the great armed conflicts could not be without violence.

=== Central Boards ===
Central Board	Members
Central Board of Belgrade (Central Board)	Jovan Atanacković (president), Milorad Gođevac, Ljubomir Davidović, Ljubomir Jovanović, Jaša Prodanović, Dimitrije Ćirković, Luka Ćelović, Golub Janić, Nikola Spasić and Milutin Stepanović.
Central Board of Vranje	Founded by Žika Rafajlović, Sima Zlatičanin, Velimir Karić, Toma Đurđević; other members incl. Ljuba Čupa, Jovan Nenadović, Dragiša Đurić, Ljuba Vulović, Petar Pešić, Dušan Tufegdžić and others.
Central Board of Skopje	Bogdan Radenković, Mihailo Šuškalović and Mihailo Mančić.
Central Board of Bitola	Jovan Ćirković, Lazar Kujundžić, Savatije Milošević, Aleksa Jovanović Kodža and David Dimitrijević.

=== Macedonia and Old Serbia ===
Inside Macedonia and Old Serbia the Chief of the Mountainous Headquarters held the highest position followed by regional voivodes and village voivodes. In every village the organization was composed so that every resident was a member of the organization and had to, without exception, follow all orders that the organization gave him. All disputes were to be solved within the village and the Turkish court was not to be involved under any circumstances. Smaller disputes were to be solved between the villagers themselves, sometimes with the help of the village voivode or chief, bigger disputes were to be solved by the regional voivode and some really large ones were to be solved by the chief of the mountainous headquarters. Every village had a chief with two helpers, a village voivode under whose command were all armed villagers and a treasurer who would collect a small monthly membership fee as well as all the fines charged by all of the mentioned institutions.

== History ==
=== 1902 ===
The Central Committee (of Belgrade) was established in 1902 by Milorad Gođevac, Luka Ćelović, Vasa Jovanović, Žika Rafajlović, Nikola Spasić and Ljuba Kovačević. Captain Rafajlović had up until then independently organized armed bands in Old Serbia. The seat of the board was in the house of Ćelović. The organization was initially funded by Ćelović who donated 50,000 dinars yearly, which at that time was a very large sum. The Committee chose Dr. Gođevac as President. It had initially funded individual, and small groups of hajduks (brigands), who were either self-organized or part of the Bulgarian revolutionary organizations in Macedonia (Supreme Macedonian-Adrianople Committee or Internal Macedonian Revolutionary Organization).

=== 1903 ===
Milorad Gođevac, Luka Ćelović and Vasilije Jovanović formed the first armed band in Belgrade on May 29, 1903. The band, which had 8 soldiers, was commanded by Ilija Slave, a Serb from Macedonia who was a kaldrmdžija (cobblestone paver).

The "Serbian Committee" was established in September 1903 in Belgrade, by the combined Central Boards of Belgrade, Vranje, Skopje and Bitola. The fighters sought to protect the Slavic Christian population from zulum (atrocities, persecution), and carried out assassinations of known persecutors. With the failed negotiations of a joint Serbian–Bulgarian action, and growing nationalism within the Bulgarian committees, the Serbian committee decided to fully organize their own armed groups. It's armed wing was thus officially activated in 1904. Among the architects were members of the Society of Saint Sava, Army Staff and Ministry of Foreign Affairs.

=== April–May 1904 ===
On Đurđevdan (23 April) 1904, Bulgarian students travelled to Belgrade to hold a congress. This was after negotiations between the Bulgarian and Serbian committees about a joint Serb-Bulgarian uprising had failed after more than 50 meetings in a period of 4–5 months. The Bulgarian students and the Serbian side constantly stressed the need for Serb–Bulgarian brotherhood. After the students had left, it was unearthed that most of these were in fact members of the Bulgarian committee, who sought to find their companions and lead them back to Bulgaria. Three of them were wholly assigned to persuade Gligor Sokolović to return to Bulgaria, but he refused. They also met with Stojan Donski.

On 25 April, two bands (četa) of some 20 fighters under voivodes Anđelko Aleksić and Đorđe Cvetković swore oath in a ceremony of the Serbian Chetnik Committee (Dr. Milorad Gođevac, Vasa Jovanović, Žika Rafailović, Luka Ćelović and General Jovan Atanacković), with prota Nikola Stefanović holding the prayers. The Committee had prepared the formation of the first bands for a number of months. The Chetniks were sent for Poreče, and on 8 May they headed out from Vranje, to Buštranje, which was divided between Serbia and Turkey. Vasilije Trbić, who guided them, told them that the best way was to go through the Kozjak and then down to the Vardar. The two voivodes however, wanted the fastest route, through the Kumanovo plains and then to Četirac. They managed to enter Turkish territory but were subsequently exposed in the plain Albanian and Turkish villages, and the Ottomans closed in on them from all sides, and they decided to stay on the Šuplji Kamen, which gave them little defence instead of meeting the army on the plains; in broad daylight, the Ottoman military easily poured bombs over the hill and killed all 24 of the Chetniks. According to Serbian state documents, the death toll was 24 Chetniks, a zaptı (Ottoman gendarmerie), and three Ottoman soldiers. Serbian deputy Ristić, according to the document, named Žika Rafajlović as the organizer of the band, and that "such adventures and thoughtless treacherous actions should be stopped".

=== July–August 1904 ===
After receiving the news in Belgrade, the Chetnik activity did not stop; four new bands were prepared for crossing the border. Veljko Mandarčević, from the Skopje field (Macedonian-Andrianopolitan Volunteer Corps), became the voivode of a band that moved into Skopska Crna Gora. The more experienced and bold Gligor Sokolović became the voivode of a band that would fight in the Prilep region (Prilepska četa). Rista Cvetković-Sušički, a former friend and voivode of Zafirov, was sent for Poreče where Micko Krstić impatiently waited for him with the band. Poreče was a source for the rebels; every villager was a martyr and hero, and although Poreče was small, it beat off all attacks, and from it, troops entered all sides, as an effectuation for the struggle. The fourth band was firstly sent to Drimkol, Ohrid, its voivodes being Đorđe Cvetković and Vasilije Trbić.

On the night of 19 July, the four bands crossed the border. They went a secure route which had been put forward by Trbić and Anđelko. They did not rush, and spent days in Kozjak and villages of the Pčinja. They went fast and lightly in the night, and carefully descended towards the Vardar transition. In the village of Živinj, in the middle of the junction, they encountered Bulgarian Voivode Bobev; the meeting at first was sudden and unpleasant, but quickly became friendly and festive. Voivode Bobev assured them that he was happy that they would fight together, and took the bands to the village of Lisičja, where they would cross over the Vardar. Only Sokolović suspected a fraud, but went reluctantly. A sudden Ottoman chase urged them to abandon the route on the river coast of Pčinja, and to cross Vardar at one of its confluences, as they had intended at first. On the night of 31 July, in the village of Lisičja, to no avail, a large Bulgarian ambush waited for Bobev to lead the Serbs to their hands – to terminate the Serbian Chetnik Movement.

In the village of Solpa, they dried their clothes on the warm summer morning, and rested in the boxwood shrubs and ate wet bread. Bobev, who was not allowed to leave them as part of the ambush, was still with them. On the next day, 2 August, the bands crossed through Drenovo, and climbed the Šipočar mountain in a long line, where they would rest and drink fragrant milk of the Vlachs. For three days they freely stayed in the mountain and watched the horizon, and routinely looked out, and then climbed to the higher Dautica mountain.

Sokolović, troubled and bothered by Bobev's presence, did not want to go further and took his band towards Babuna. The three bands that stayed, followed by Bobev, descended into Belica. There they found a number of Bulgarian bands, led by Voivode Banča, who told them to call on Micko, a lord of Poreče. The Serbs awaited him, not sensing a deceit. But Trbić, who had always sought the background in things, found out from a drunk Bulgarian friend, whom he had been drinking with for an hour, that there was a plot against them. Trbić told a villager assistant to report to Micko not to come. After learning this, the band of Trbić and Đorđe Cvetković turned to Demir-Hisar. Mandarčević and Sušički stayed in Belica, ready for betrayal. In the mountain village of Slansko they found yet another Bulgarian band, of Voivode Đurčin, who kindly, but with the intent to follow them, sent with them two followers to Cer, in Demir-Hisar.

In the meantime, in Belgrade, there was still hope that the Serbs and Bulgarians would work together in Macedonia; however, in Macedonian villages, there began massacres. On the night of 6 August, Bulgarian major Atanas Babata and his band entered the Serbian village of Kokošinje, where they were searching for people that were condemned to death by the Bulgarian Committee. The Bulgarian band demanded that the village priests and teachers renounce their Serbian identity, but they refused, and they massacred over 53 people. A servant of one of the teachers, who had managed to hide, set out to find the band of Jovan Dovezenski, who he had heard was crossing the border. The teacher's servant found another Serbian band, that of Jovan Pešić-Strelac, which had learnt of the massacre, but also of that of Jordan Spasev, who had killed members of the notable Dunković family on 11 August.

The Serbian Chetniks in Poreče and Demir-Hisar, constantly followed by Bulgarians, did not know of the massacres. The hungry and tired band of Đorđe Cvetković arrived at the village of Gornji Divjaci, where they were hosted by the villagers who had brought cheese and rakija. They rested in sheets of sheep skin, and the village children came with bread and listened to their stories. Cvetković, Trbić and Stevan Ćela rested in the house of the village leader, and ate several meals. In the next morning, Trbić walked through the yard and went down some stairs, and saw an Ottoman jandarma whom he shot, who was then buried in the forest. The rest ended and the band assembled and walked the river across the mountain. They arrived at the village of Cer the next day where they also found Bulgarians, and the Bulgarian voivodes Hristo Uzunov and Georgi Sugarev joined their company.

In the mountainous village of Mramorac, where Petar Chaulev had set up camp in the forest, Trbić band were told that the Bulgarian Committee had prohibited them to go to Drimkol. On the same day, 14 August, the Bulgarians had killed Serbian priest Stavro Krstić, which the Chetniks later learnt from the villagers. Far from the other bands, without help, tricked and surrounded, the band understood their situation. Chaulev informed them of their disarmament and the Bulgarian Committee's verdict of crime against the Bulgarian organization. They were only shouted at, as they were saved by some ethnic Serb voivodes in the Bulgarian bands: Tase and Dejan from Prisovjan and Cvetko from Jablanica in Debar, who were bound by oath to the Bulgarian Committee, but nevertheless openly defended the Serbian Chetniks, and friends, whom they had wintered together with in Belgrade. They awaited Dame Gruev, the second leader of the Bulgarian Committee after Sarafov, who would arrive from Bitola. Gruev and his escort arrived as village priests on a night. Trbić knew Gruev from the Kruševo Uprising and from an encounter in Serava. Trbić used their acquaintance and memories, reminding Gruev of the common revolutionary fight and his childhood, when Gruev was a cadet of the Society of Saint Sava in Belgrade, and an apprentice in the printing house of Pero Todorović, which was called Smiljevo after Gruev's birthplace.

=== 1906–07 ===
In 1906 and 1907, the Serbian Chetniks experience a period of great success.

=== 1906 ===
During 1906, armed conflicts continued in Skopje Sandžak. There were 16 recorded clashes with Komita companies. 37 Serbian Chetniks were killed and two were wounded. Bulgarian losses were somewhat higher. A total of 219 murders and 77 serious injuries were recorded. 61 people were kidnapped and are still missing.

=== 1907 ===
In 1907, there were 27 armed conflicts in the Skopje Sandžak. 113 Bulgarian and 14 Serbian Chetniks were killed. Turkish losses were only six people. During the whole year, there were 364 murders, 77 injuries, and 90 people missing in the mountains.

=== Young Turk Revolution ===
When the Young Turk Revolution broke out (1907–1908), and there was a temporary peace in Macedonia, the Young Turks gave Serbs more rights. Several members of the Organization joined the Serb Democratic League.

== Operations and events ==
- The wounding of Ilija Slave (June, 1903)
- Fight at Djuriški monastery (early september, 1903)
- The assassination of Šefir-beg (January 21, 1904)
- Fight on Šuplji Kamen (May 27, 1904)
- Fight in Slatine (October 5, 1904)
- Kokošinje massacre (August 6, 1904)
- Rudar massacre (August 11, 1904)
- Murder of priest Stavro Krstić (August 14, 1904)
- Murder of priest Taško (January 15, 1905)
- Fight in Tabanovce (27 March 1905)
- Lynching of Chetniks in Kumanovo (March 28, 1905)
- Fight in Velika Hoča (25 May 1905)
- Battles for Vuksan and Matejče (30 April 1905)
- Fight on Kitka (30 April 1905)
- Battle on the Oreške fields (10 May 1905)
- Fight in Petraljica (31 May 1905)
- Fight on Mukos (June 20, 1905)
- Fight on Movnatac (August 18, 1905)
- * Fight on Paklište (February 1, 1906)
- Battle of Čelopek (7 February 1906)
- Fight in Drenovac (March 9, 1906)
- Fight in Nikodim (April 1906)
- Fight in Kriva Brda (May 12, 1906)
- Battle on Kurtov Kamen (July 8, 1906)
- Battles at Maleš, Berovo and Štalkovice (1906)
- Battle for Gabrovnik (May 7, 1907)
- Fight on Kurtov Kamen (1907)
- Fight in Nebregovo (1907)
- Battle of Drenovo (1907)
- Battle of Pasjane (1907)
- Fight on Paklište (1907/1908)

Operations temporarily stopped during the Young Turk Revolution (1908), and until the Young Turk coup (1910), after which oppression against Christians intensified.

== Chief of staff ==
Chiefs of the Mountainous Headquarters

Left side of the Vardar or Predvardarje

- Baceta (until June 1905)
- Mihailo Džervinac (–April 1907)
- Pavle Blažarić (April–Autumn 1907)
- Milivoje Čolak-Antić (end of 1907)
- Vojislav Tankosić (1907–08)

Right side of the Vardar or Prekovardarje

- Sreten Rajković-Rudnički (1905)
- Panta Radosavljević (end of 1905)
- Jovan Babunski (–1907)
- Alimpije Marjanovic (1908)

== Armament ==
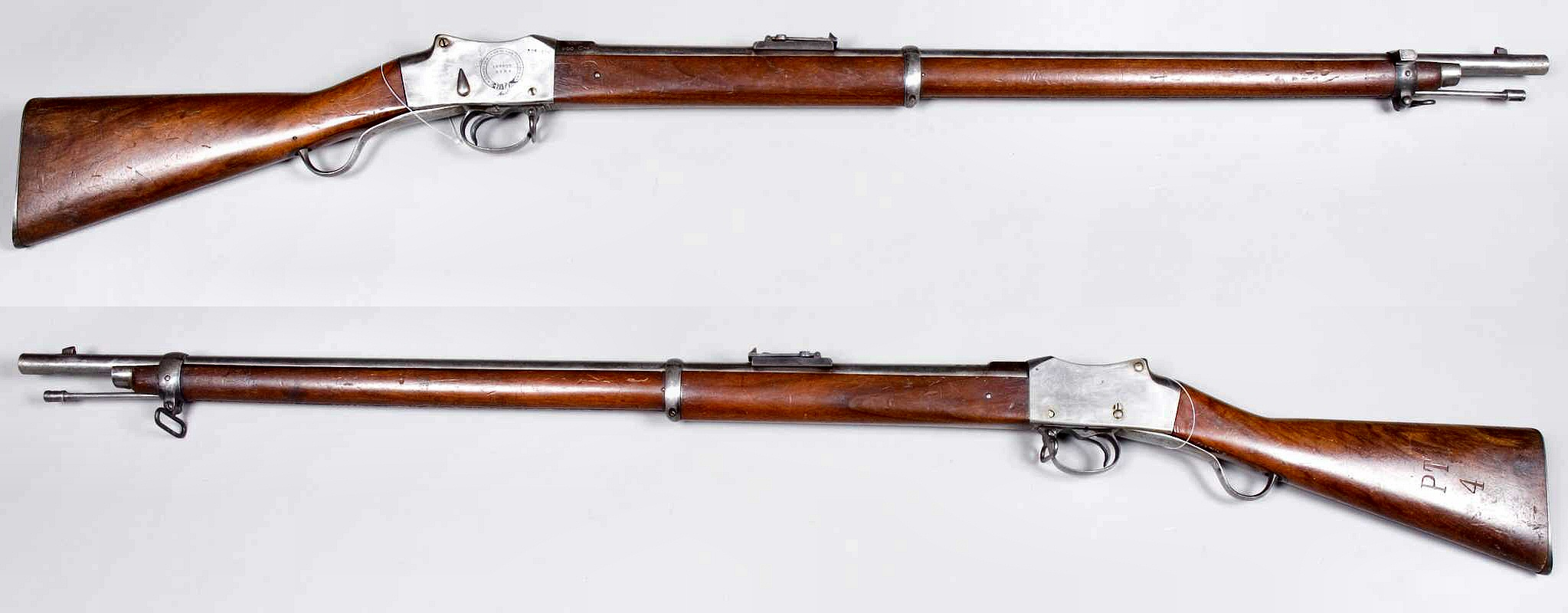
Martini-Henry rifle.

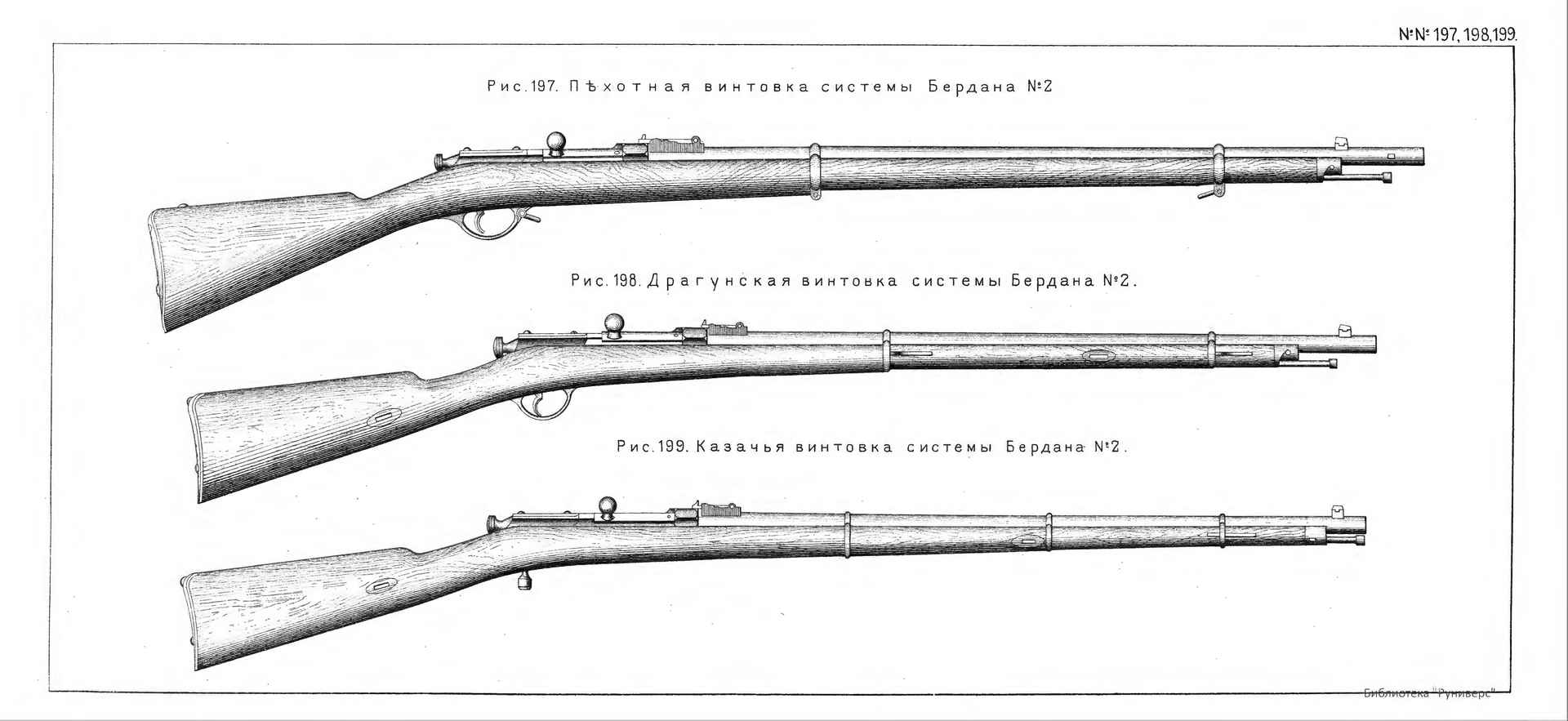
Berdan II rifle.

- Berdan rifle (I and II), known as brzometka (pl. brzometke) or berdanka (pl. berdanci, berdanke)
- Hand-thrown bombs
- Martini-Henry rifle, known as martinka (pl. martinci, martinke).

In 1904–05, the Chetniks were supplied with:

- Mauser-Koka rifle, known as brzometka (pl. brzometke) or kokinka (pl. kokinke).
- Various revolvers, also known as altipatlak (Turkish "six-shooter")

== Culture ==
The members of the organization were known by their nom de guerre (четничко име, "Chetnik name"). The descendants of Jovan Stanojković "Dovezenski" and Jovan Stojković "Babunski" are surnamed with their Chetnik names (Dovezenski and Babunski, respectively).

=== Cryptography ===
From the start of the organization, cryptographic words, and later numbers, were used. For instance, Božija kuća ("God's house") was used for Serbia, while "Gospodin u Božijoj kući" ("Mister in God's house") was used for the President of the Executive Board in Vranje. Common uses were: štap ("rod") for rifle, jabuke ("apples") for bombs, kafa ("coffee") for gunpowder, šećer ("sugar") for poison, golemiot ("great one") or starac ("elder") for the Chief of the Mountain Headquarters, brabonjci ("sheep-feces") for Turks, Smirana for Skopje, Venecija for Vranje, Jerusalim for Bitola, Berlin for Belgrade, Neptun for Poreče, etc.

== Legacy ==
The organization continued its existence and also played a role during the Balkan Wars, as well as during World War I. During the First Balkan War, Chetniks were used as a vanguard to soften up the enemy forward of advancing armies, for attacks on communications behind enemy lines, as field gendarmerie and to establish basic administration in occupied areas.

== Gallery ==
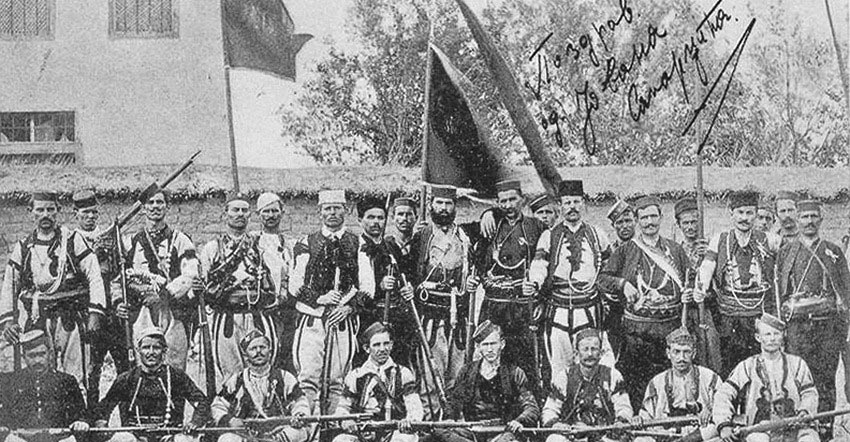
Group photo, July 1908

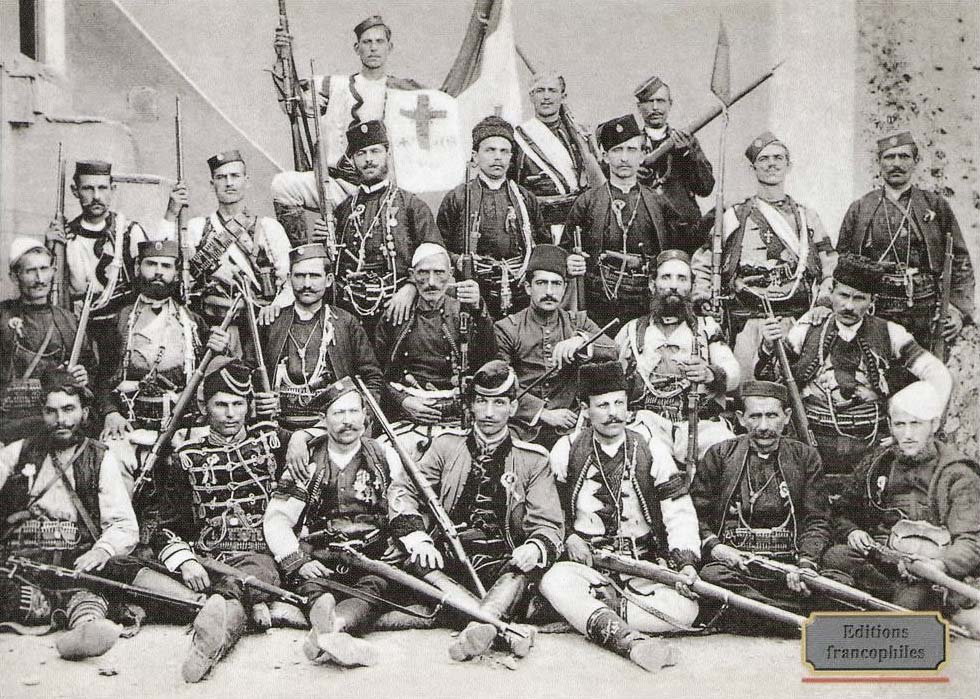
Most notable commanders, July 1908, no. 1

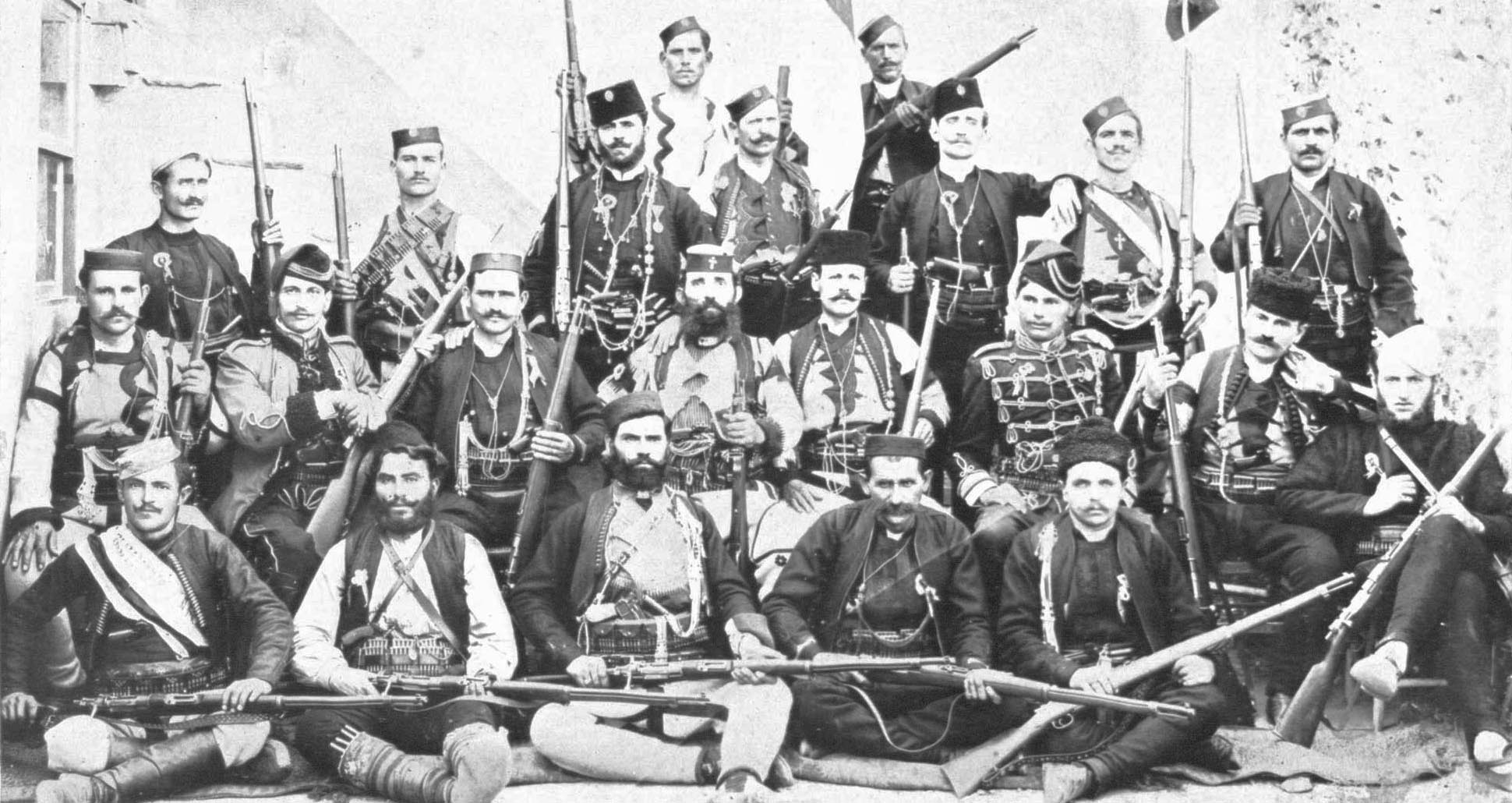
Most notable commanders, July 1908, no. 2

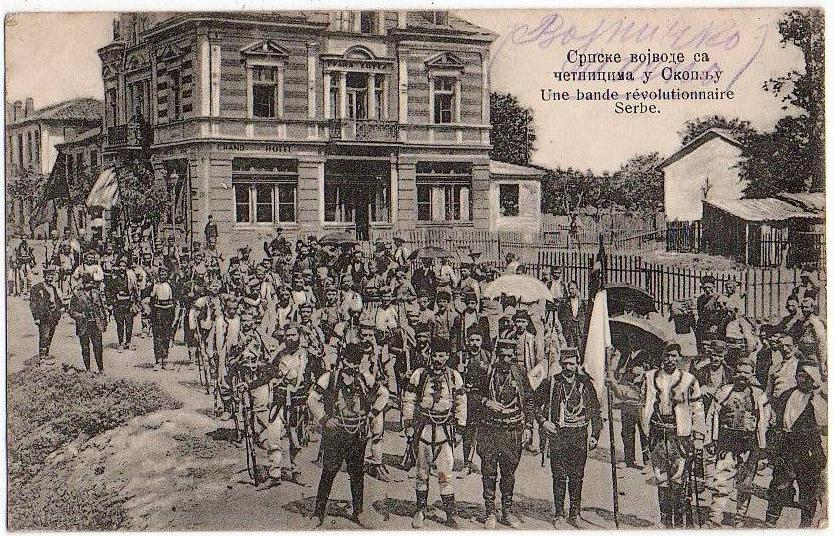
Chetniks in Skopje, July 1908

== See also ==
- Army of the Kingdom of Serbia
- Hellenic Macedonian Committee, Greek nationalist organization during the Macedonian Struggle
- Narodna Odbrana, Serbian organization
- White Hand, Serbian organization
- Young Bosnia, Bosnian pan-Yugoslav organization
- List of Chetnik voivodes

== Annotations ==
1. The Serbian Committee was the main body of the Serbian Revolutionary Organization, established through the combination of the four Serbian Central Boards (Belgrade, Vranje, Skopje and Bitola). It was also known as the Central Revolutionary Secret Board (Централни револуционарни тајни одбор), or Central Board of the Serbian Chetnik Organisation (Централни одбор српске четничке организације).
2. There were two main headquarters of the military organization, the Mountainous Headquarters of Predvardarje ("before the Vardar"), in Skopje, and the Mountainous Headquarters of Prekovardarje (Прековардарје, "over the Vardar"). The supreme commander of each headquarters was titled Chief of the Mountainous Headquarters (шеф горског штаба); the first was titled "... of Predvardarje", or "... on the right side of the Vardar" (на десној страни Вардара) or "... for the right shore of Vardar" (за десну обалу Вардара); the second was titled "... of Prekovardarje", or "... on the left side of the Vardar" (на левој страни Вардара) or "... for the left shore of Vardar" (за леву обалу Вардара).

== Sources ==
Books

- Bajić, Jovo (1998). Srpska revolucionarna organizacija: komitsko četovanje u staroj Srbiji i Makedoniji 1903–1912. Duška. ISBN 978-86-7745-024-3.
- Blažarić, Pavle (2006). Božica Mladenović (ed.). Memoari (in Serbian). Institut za srpsku kulturu. ISBN 9788682797500.
- Dedijer, Vladimir; Anić, Života (2008). Dokumenti o spoljnoj politici Kraljevine Srbije: dodat. 1–3. Odeljenje istorijskih nauka.
- Dedijer, Vladimir; Anić, Života; Samardžić, Radovan (2006). Dokumenti o spoljnoj politici Kraljevine Srbije: sv. 2 15. SANU, Odeljenje istorijskih nauka. ISBN 9788670254169.
- Đurić, Veljko Đ.; Mijović, Miličko (1993). Ilustrovana istorija četničkog pokreta (in Serbian). Narodna knj.
- Georgevitch, T. R. (2012) [1918]. Macedonia. Forgotten Books. ISBN 978-1-4400-6519-4.
- Hadži-Vasiljević, Jovan (1928). Četnička akcija u Staroj Srbiji i Maćedoniji (in Serbian). Belgrade: Sv. Sava.
- Ilić, Vladimir (2006). Српска четничка акција 1903–1912 (in Serbian). Belgrade: Ecolibri. ISBN 978-86-7905-044-1.
- Ivanić, Ivan (1910). Maćedonija i maćedondži (in Serbian). Vol. 2. Štampa Savića i Komp.
- Ivetić, Velimir J. (2013), Политичка улога министара војних Краљевине Србије од 1903. до 1914. године.
- Jovanović, J. M. (1938). Borba za narodno ujedinjenje 1903–1908. Izdavačko i knjižarsko preduzeće G. Kon.
- Jovanović, Aleksa (1937). Spomenica dvadesetogodišnjice oslobodjenja Južne Srbije, 1912–1937 (in Serbian). Južna Srbija.
- Krakov, Stanislav (1990) [1930]. Plamen četništva (in Serbian). Belgrade: Hipnos.
- Mitropan, Petar (1933). Прилози за историју штампе у Старој Србији и Македонији 1871–1912 (in Serbian). Skopje: Publisher unknown.
- Nušić, Branislav (1966). Sabrana dela (in Serbian). Vol. 22. Belgrade: NIP "Jež".
- Pavlović, Momčilo (2007) [September 14–16, 2006]. Gerila na Balkanu (in Serbian). Institute for Disarmament and Peace Studies.
- Paunović, Marinko (1998). Srbi: biografije znamenitih: A-Š (in Serbian). Belgrade: Emka. ISBN 9788685205040.
- Pećanac, Kosta (1997) [1933]. Četnička akcija 1903–1912. Belgrade: Hipnos.
- Pejčić, Predrag (2007). Četnički pokret u Kraljevini Srbiji (in Serbian). Kragujevac: Pogledi.
- Pešić, Miodrag D. (2000). Stari četnici (in Serbian). Kragujevac: Novi pogledi.
- Rastović, Aleksandar (2011). Velika Britanija i makedonsko pitanje 1903-1908 godine. Istorijski institut. ISBN 978-86-7743-088-7.
- Rudić, S.; Milkić, M.; Institute of History, B.I.B. (2013). The Balkan Wars 1912/1913 : New Views and Interpretations. Institute of History, Institute for Strategic Research. p. 85. ISBN 978-86-7743-103-7.
- Simić, Stevan (2012) [1988]. Srpske Komite: Komitsko četovanje u Staroj Srbiji i Makedoniji 1903–1912 (in Serbian). Belgrade: Publisher unknown.
- Simić, Stevan (1998). Bajić, Jovo (ed.). Srpska revolucionarna organizacije, komitsko četovanje u Staroj Srbiji i Makedoniji 1903–1912 (in Serbian). Belgrade: Duška.
- Tomasevich, Jozo (1975). The Chetniks. Stanford University Press. ISBN 978-0-8047-0857-9.
- Trbić, Vasilije (1996). Drašković, Aleksandar (ed.). Memoari (1898–1912) (in Serbian). Belgrade: Kultura.
- Trifunović, Ilija Ž. (1933). Trnovitim stazama (in Serbian). Belgrade: GSSZZ.
- Trifunović, Ilija Ž. (1930). Krv četnika (in Serbian). Belgrade: Planeta.
- "Krvave borbe srpskih četa po macedoniji i njihov rad od početka 1903 do danas" [The bloody battles of the Serbian troops in Macedonia and their work from the beginning of 1903 until today]. Književnog pregleda (in Serbian) (1). Belgrade: Savić. 15 June 1912.

Journals

- Rastović, Aleksandar (2008). "Велика Британија према српским акцијама у Македонији 1903–1907". Историјски часопис. 57: 355–374.
- Rastović, Aleksandar (2010). "Macedonian issue in the British Parliament 1903–1908" (PDF). Istorijski časopis. 59: 365–386.
- Jerinić, P. D. S. (2008). "Војводе из четничке акције у Старој Србији и Маћедонији 1903–1912". Добровољачки гласник. 32. Belgrade.
- Šešum, Uroš (2016). "Четничка организација у Скопској Црној Гори 1903–1908. године" (PDF). ZMSI. 93. Matica srpska: 55–69.
- Simijanović, J. (2008). "Okolnosti na početku srpske četničke akcije – neki pokušaji saradnje i sukobi četnika i komita u Makedoniji" (PDF). Baština. 25: 239–250. Archived from the original (PDF) on 2012-03-17.
- Vučetić, Biljana (2006). "Српска револуционарна организација у Османском царству на почетку XX века". Историјски часопис. 53: 359–374.
- Vučetić, Biljana (2007). "Сећања Антонија Тодоровића на револуционарну акцију српског народа у Турској 1904–1912. године". Мешовита грађа. 28: 265–305.
- Vučetić, Biljana (2008). "Богдан Раденковић и Милан Ракић". Историјски часопис. 57: 413–426.
- Vučetić, Biljana (2010). "Погледи на организацију Српске одбране у Македонији у 1906. години". Весник. 37. Belgrade: Војни музеј: 165–170.

Newspapers

- Ranković, Živ. J. (April 1939a). "Četnička akcija [I]". Beogradske opštinske novine. No. 4.
- Ranković, Živ. J. (May 1939b). "Četnička akcija [II]". Beogradske opštinske novine. No. 5.
- Živković, Simo (December 1998). "Sakupi Se Jedna Četa Mala". Srpsko Nasleđe Istorijske Sveske (12). Belgrade: „GLAS“ d.d.o. Archived from the original on 2012-03-03.
- Vesti Online (2011-12-18). "Prvi beogradski četnici". Belgrade.
