= Serb revolutionary organizations =

This list includes revolutionary organizations aimed at liberating and unifying Serb-inhabited territories into the historical national state of Serbia—it includes organizations established after the creation of Revolutionary Serbia (1804) and before the establishment of Second Yugoslavia (1945).

== List ==
Organization	Active	Notes	Image
Serbian Revolutionary organization	1803–13	Organized by leading Serbs of the Belgrade Pashalik (Assembly of Rebel Leaders), conspiracy starting in 1803. Fought the First Serbian Uprising (1804–13) that saw the creation of Revolutionary Serbia. Uprising quelled in 1813.	
Rebels under Miloš Obrenović	1815	Organized by leading Serbs of the nahiyas of Rudnik, Kragujevac and Čačak. Fought the Second Serbian Uprising (1815) that saw the creation of Principality of Serbia. Uprising succeeded.	
Vasojević network	1838–41	Organized rebellion in the sanjaks of Novi Pazar, Pristina and Peć and Highland tribes.	
Stojković Organization	1840–41	Organized rebellion in the Sanjak of Niš, which broke out early after a spy disclosed its preparations, failed.	
Serb National Board (Srpski narodni odbor)	1848–1849	Established with the May Assembly (1–3 May 1848) that proclaimed a Serbian autonomous voivodeship within the Austrian Empire—Serbian Vojvodina—during the Revolutions of 1848 when Serbs fought the Hungarians.	
Secret organization in eastern Bosnia	1849–1855	Organized by Ilija Garašanin's circle, active in 1849–55, aimed at preparing uprising in the eastern Bosnia Eyalet but instead used as intelligence agency.	
Committee (Komitet)	1860–1861	Secret revolutionary organization established in Belgrade headed by Yugoslavist Matija Ban. Aimed at liberating Bosnia and south Serbia, and then the rest of the South Slavic lands.	
Serbian Board	1861–1872	A secret national liberation committee established in 1861 by politician Ilija Garašanin after Prince Mihailo's approval. Garašanin appointed Atanasije Nikolić the operative and technical manager of a network of agents. Nikolić was tasked with drafting a programme for execution of liberation. A board (committee) was established at the turn of 1861–62, which also included official Lazar Arsenijević Batalaka as president, and lieutenant Franjo Zah. Ilija Garašanin came to manage the operations. Nikolić made up plans for preparations for uprising in the interior of European Turkey. The committee had, according to his memoir, agents in "Bosnia, Herzegovina, Dalmatia, Croatia, Slavonia, Bulgaria, Macedonia and Bucharest" and there were sub-boards in all of them. Nikolić blamed Minister of Defence Milivoje Blaznavac for Serbia's inaction in the matter. Nikolić was himself used as an agent, transferring arms from Russia in 1862 and twice in 1867, which affected the work of the organization. The organization became inactive with Blaznavac's refusal to support uprising, and Nikolić was definitively removed from the agent network in late April 1872.	
United Serb Youth	1866–1872	Political youth organization active in Austria-Hungary and Serbia.	
Association for Serb Liberation and Unification	1871–?	Established in September 1871 in Cetinje, Montenegro, by the United Serbian Youth. It had boards in Cetinje, Novi Sad and Belgrade.	
Main Board for Serb Liberation	1871–1872	Established in late 1871 in Kragujevac, Serbia, by Socialist opposition youth gathered around Jevrem Marković. It had boards in Niš, Leskovac and Pirot.	
Niš Committee	1874–1878	Established on 24 September 1874 in Niš by local leaders. Aimed at liberation of the Sanjak of Niš and unification with Serbia. Active in the Serbian–Ottoman Wars (1876–1878).	
Central Board of the Bosnian Uprising for Liberation	1875–1877	Established in 1875 in Bosnia by Serb leaders. Notable members included founder Golub Babić, Vaso Vidović and Jovan Bilbija. Active in the Herzegovina uprising (1875–1877). Signed the Proclamation of the Unification of Bosnia with Serbia on 2 July 1876.	
Brotherhood of Serb-Macedonians and Old-Serbians	1877–1889	At first a secret committee named "Board for Old Serbia and Macedonia" established in the beginning of 1877, with initiatives for liberation of Macedonia and solving the Macedonian question. Members included Kosta Šumenković from Struga, Todor Stanković from Niš, professor Miloš Milojević, archimandrite Sava Dečanac, Aksentije Hadžiarsić, teacher Despot Badžović and Kuzman Badžović from Kruševo, Gligorije Čemerikić and others. On 20 May 1877 Badžović was in the delegation of "Serbs of Old Serbia" that petitioned the Serbian government for the liberation and unification of Old Serbia with the Principality of Serbia. On 20 May 1879 Despot Badžović suggested to the Ministry of Foreign Affairs to send Serb bands into Macedonia and rise up the people. The Serbian government advised against support to the uprisings in Macedonia. On 23 February 1885 a meeting (zbor) was held in Belgrade, presided by Despot Badžović, which urged Prime Minister M. Garašanin to begin the Serbian national programme in Macedonia which would protect Serbian national interest. More meetings were held in Niš (3 March), Belgrade and Vranje which improved the government's viewpoint on the matter. In 1889 Despot Badžović suggested that the Namesništvo (regency) gather volunteers to send into Macedonia, but the government disagreed.	
Committee (of the Kumanovo Uprising)	1878	Established on 20 January 1878, active in the Kumanovo Uprising. Its supreme leaders were Orthodox priest Dimitrije Paunović and Veljan Cvetković.	
Board (for Old Serbia and Macedonia)	1880	A secret department under the auspice of the Ministry of Internal Affairs, established on 2 September 1880 with members Matija Ban, Miloš Milojević, archpriest Jakov Pavlović, Đorđe Popović and military professor Jovan Dragašević. With the end of the Liberalist government on 2 November 1880, the department ceased to exist.	
Revolutionary Committee in Vranje	1885–1902	A secret guerrilla group based in Vranje on the Serbian–Ottoman border. At first independent and sponsored by the Ministry of Internal Affairs, it was allowed to use Vranje as a base for crossing into Ottoman territory for sabotage and brigandage. A band was captured by the Ottomans in June 1886 in Kriva Palanka. When the persecution of Serbs in Kosovo and Metohija, Preševo kaza and Sanjak of Novi Pazar by Muslim Albanians and Muslim Slavs increased in the years of 1897–1900, and lack of effort to prosecute the crimes by Ottoman authorities, the Priština Consulate organized assassinations of the worst kachak perpetrators and Albanian organizers of violence on Serbs. In 1901 the group was tasked with the assassination of known oppressor Kadri Zaim-Bey in the Preševo kaza, which failed miserably the first time in July, then succeeded in December 1901.	
Serbian Chetnik Organization	1903–1908	The Serbian Chetnik Organization organized guerrilla bands in the region of North Macedonia in the period of 1903–1908. It was an unification of various organizations and groups. The Revolutionary/Central Board was established in mid-1903 in Belgrade, led by influential citizens Dr. Milorad Gođevac, merchant Luka Ćelović and general Jovan Atanacković. The Executive Board was established in Vranje, led by officer Žika Rafajlović. Further Boards were established in Bitola, headed by consul Savatije Milošević, Skopje, headed by teacher Bogdan Radenković, and Kumanovo, headed by priest Taško Petrović. The secret organization of Srpska Odbrana ("Serb Defence") was established in 1905 in Ottoman territory, with Bogdan Radenković as member, with the aims of defending the Serb population in Old Serbia and Macedonia, prepare it for liberation, and counter enemy attacks. Radenković eventually became the head of guerrilla operations in Macedonia. The Vranje Board was tasked with operations. The Bitola Board and Mountain Staff in Poreč were in charge of Western Povardarje, while the Skopje Board and Mountain Staff on Kozjak were in charge of Eastern Povardarje.	
Serb Brothers Society	1905–1918	Established on 23 January 1905 by Golub Janić. Supported the Serbian Chetnik Organization.	
Narodna Odbrana	1908–	Revolutionary organization established on 8 October 1908. Led by Stepa Stepanović.	
Young Bosnia	c. 1909–1914	Established in c. 1909 by Yugoslavist Bosnian Serb students. Upheld relations with the Black Hand. Carried out the Assassination of Archduke Franz Ferdinand.	
Unification or Death, known as "Black Hand"	1911–	Established on 9 May 1911 by militarist high-ranked members of the Royal Serbian Army led by Colonel Dragutin Dimitrijević Apis, that took a part as junior conspirators that assassinated King Alexander and Queen Draga Obrenović in a May Coup 1903.	
White Hand	1912	Established by high-ranked members of the Royal Serbian Army led by Colonel Petar Živković, as an opposition to the militarist Black Hand. The White Hand supported the Royal House of Karađorđević and the democratic institutions of the country.	

== See also ==
- Serbian Revolution

== Sources ==
- Andrejević, Borislav (1988). "Записи о Нишкој буни" (PDF). Лесковачки зборник. 28: 245–262.
- Jagodić, Miloš (2016). "SERBIAN SECRET ORGANISATION IN EASTERN BOSNIA (1849-1855)". Istraživanja. 27: 190–199. Archived from the original on 2017-12-03.
- Jagodić, Miloš (2011). "Планови o политици Србије према Старој Србији и Македонији (1878-1885)". Историјски часопис. 60: 435–460 – via CEEOL.
- Jagodić, Miloš (2015). "Failed Conspiracy: Organisation and Preparation of the Serbian Uprising against Ottoman Rule in 1840–1841". LIMESplus (3). HESPERIAedu: 39–62. ISSN 1820-0869 – via CEEOL.
- Ljušić, Radoš (2014). "РЕВОЛУЦИОНАРНА СРЕДЊОШКОЛСКА ОМЛАДИНА" [REVOLUTIONARY HIGH SCHOOL YOUTH]. Српске студије. 5: 139–151.
- Perić, Miodrag (2015). "Македонска емиграција у балканским земљама у време Источне кризе 1875-1881. године". Politička revija. 46 (4): 187–202. doi:10.22182/pr.4642015.11.
- Radenić, Andrija (1967). "Документација тајног национално ослободилачког комитета у Београду 1860-1861" (PDF). ГОДИШЊАК. XIV. Музеј града Београда: 61–80.
- Raković, Aleksandar (2024). "СРПСКО УЈЕДИЊЕЊЕ: ИДЕЈЕ, ПЛАНОВИ И РЕАЛИЗАЦИЈА (19–21. ВЕК)". Лесковачки зборник. 64 (2): 259–272.
- Šešum, Uroš (2018). "ТАЈНЕ ЗАГРАНИЧНЕ АКТИВНОСТИ СРПСКЕ ВЛАДЕ У ОСМАНСКОМ ЦАРСТВУ 1901. ГОДИНЕ". Српске студије. VII. Центар за српске студије.
- Stojančević, Vladimir (1972). "Политичка акција Србије у Босни". Историјски часопис. 19. Istorijski institut: 165-.
- Stojančević, Vladimir (1992). "Значај устанка 1841" (PDF). Лесковачки зборник. 32.
- Vojvodić, Vaso (1979). "Атанасије Николић: Опис радње". Мешовита грађа [Miscellanea]. 7. Belgrade: Istorijski institut: 151-.
- Vučetić, Biljana (2006). "Српска револуционарна организација у Османском царству на почетку XX века". Историјски часопис. 53: 359–374.
- Vučetić, Biljana (2012). Наша ствар у Османском царству [Our Issue in the Ottoman Empire]. Istorijski institut. ISBN 978-86-7743-095-5.
- Vučetić, Biljana (2018). Богдан Раденковић (1874-1917). Istorijski institut. ISBN 978-86-7743-123-5.
- Zlatanović, Momčilo (1992). "Четнички (комитски) покрет" (PDF). Лесковачки зборник. 32.
