= Žika Rafajlović =

Serbian politician

Živojin Rafajlović (Serbian Cyrillic: Живојин Рафајловић, 1871 – 1953), known as Žika (Жика) was co-founder of the Serbian Chetnik Organization, politician, state deputy, a member of the Democrats. He was the Ban of Vardar during 1940 and 1941.

== Early life ==
He was born in Mionica, Principality of Serbia. He finished the Military Academy as an infantry captain, 2nd class. He worked as a frontier guard in Vranje, which became his hometown.

== Serbian Chetnik Organization ==
The Central Committee (of Belgrade) was established in 1902 by Milorad Gođevac, Luka Ćelović, Vasa Jovanović, Žika Rafajlović, Nikola Spasić and Ljuba Kovačević.

On 25 April 1904, two armed cheta groups of some 20 fighters under vojvoda Anđelko Aleksić and vojvoda Đorđe Cvetković swore oath in a ceremony before Milorad Gođevac, Vasa Jovanović, Žika Rafajlović, Luka Ćelović and General Jovan Atanacković, with prota Nikola Stefanović holding the prayers. The Committee had prepared the formation of the first bands for a number of months. The bands crossed into Ottoman territory on 8 May, but were subsequently exposed in the Albanian and Turkish villages. The Ottoman army killed all of the Chetniks at the Fight on Šuplji Kamen hill on May 27. According to Serbian state documents, the death toll was 24 Chetniks, a zaptı (Ottoman gendarmerie), and three Ottoman soldiers. Serbian deputy Ristić, according to the document, named Žika Rafajlović as the organizer of the band, and that "such adventures and thoughtless treacherous actions should be stopped".

== Family ==
He had five sons.

== Annotations ==
- His surname is infrequently spelled as Rafailović (Рафаиловић).

== See also ==
- List of Chetnik voivodes

== Sources ==
- Radoš Ljušić (2005). Vlade Srbije: 1805-2005. Zavod za udžbenike i nastavna sredstva. ISBN 9788617131119.
- "www.glas-javnosti.co.yu".
- "Vesti online / Vesti / Srbija / Najveće predratne afere (11): Oglodao kosti Nemanjića".
