= Luka Ćelović =

Serbian businessman (1854 – 1929)

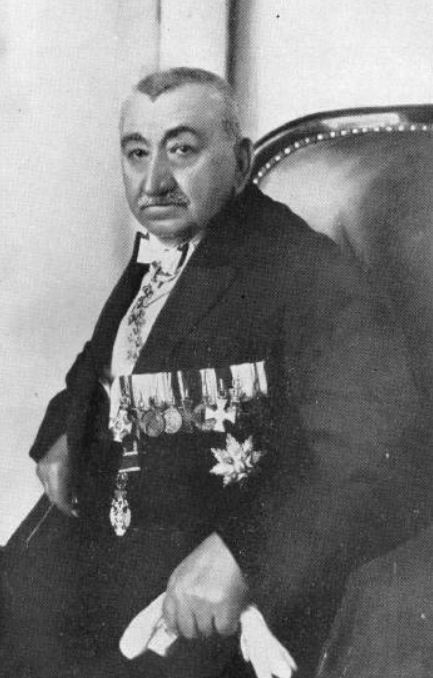
- Portrait of Ćelović
- Born: 18 October 1854; Pridvorci, Ottoman Empire
- Died: 15 August 1929 (aged 74); Belgrade, Kingdom of Yugoslavia
- Occupation: businessman

Luka Ćelović also known as Luka Ćelović-Trebinjac (Serbian Cyrillic: Лука Ћеловић; 18 October 1854 – 15 August 1929) was a Serbian businessman, merchant and benefactor. At the beginning of the 20th century, he was one of the richest and influential people in Serbia, a patriot and a great benefactor, also a philanthropist of education. He was the first president of the Belgrade Cooperative. In 1902, with Milorad Gođevac, he founded the Serbian Chetnik Organization in Belgrade.

== Biography ==
Ćelović was born in Pridvorci, near Trebinje. He finished his grammar school in Trebinje, Banja Luka and Brčko. He left Bosnia and Hercegovina in 1872 for Belgrade, where Archimandrite Nićifor Dučić, a family friend, found him a job as an apprentice in then famous store held by Radosavljević & Ignjatijević.

Three years later, when the Herzegovina uprising began, Ćelović went back to his native Hercegovina as a volunteer soldier. In combat against Turks he was wounded, but soon recovered and continued to fight. When Serbia declared war on the Ottoman Empire, volunteers from Hercegovina went back to Belgrade, thus Luka Ćelović continued combating in both Serbo–Turkish wars.

After the war, with the support of his countrymen, Trieste traders Aleksa Krsmanović and Rista Parnanos, Ćelović started his own business as an independent merchant.

In 1882 he established the Belgrade Cooperative, and financed the construction of its administrative office in Belgrade. He also helped finance the Hotel Bristol. These two buildings are among the most famous architectural designs of Belgrade's Samavala district. In 1899 Ćelović was elected as President of the Board of the Belgrade Cooperative. Self-taught, he made the Belgrade Cooperative one of the strongest Serbian financial institutions.

Although he had a rudimentary education himself, he had an interest in the development of science and education. It stemmed from the period of his life, during which he was part of the Chetnik movement, when he became closely connected with Milorad Gođevac, general Jovan Atanacković and the students from Old Serbia (now Macedonia), leading him to the lifelong conviction that education was the basis of the Serbian future. That and other reasons resulted in his making the University of Belgrade the sole beneficiary of his fortune when he died.

Printing of the Glasnik Hemijskog Drustva Beograd (Bulletin of the Chemical Society) with Nikola A. Pušin as editor and chief, was enabled thanks to financial assistance from the Luka Ćelović-Trebinje Fund.

Milorad Gođevac, impressed by the success of the Bulgarian agents and četnici in converting the Macedonian Slavs to Bulgarian nationalism, proposed a similar plan of action by Serbia. In 1902 a group of Serbian nationalists, headed by Luka Ćelović and Milorad Gođevac, organized the Executive Committee of the Serbian Chetnik Organization. Ćelović himself gave generous sums from his very considerable savings to the organization. A Committee (Komitski odbor) was organized at Vranje with branches at Leskovac and Niš. Serbia's government for a time discouraged this private action but educators and teachers who suffered at the hands of the Bulgars thought otherwise and eventually impressed upon the government and prevailed.

Apart from being a successful businessman, Ćelović was also supportive of common welfare, he and Dr. Milorad Gođevac, a Belgrade physician, were funding troops to fight for Old Serbia. The Bulgarian committee noticed the danger in such actions and sentenced Ćelović and Gođevac to death in absentia. An assassin was sent by them to Serbia, but he never made it to Belgrade.

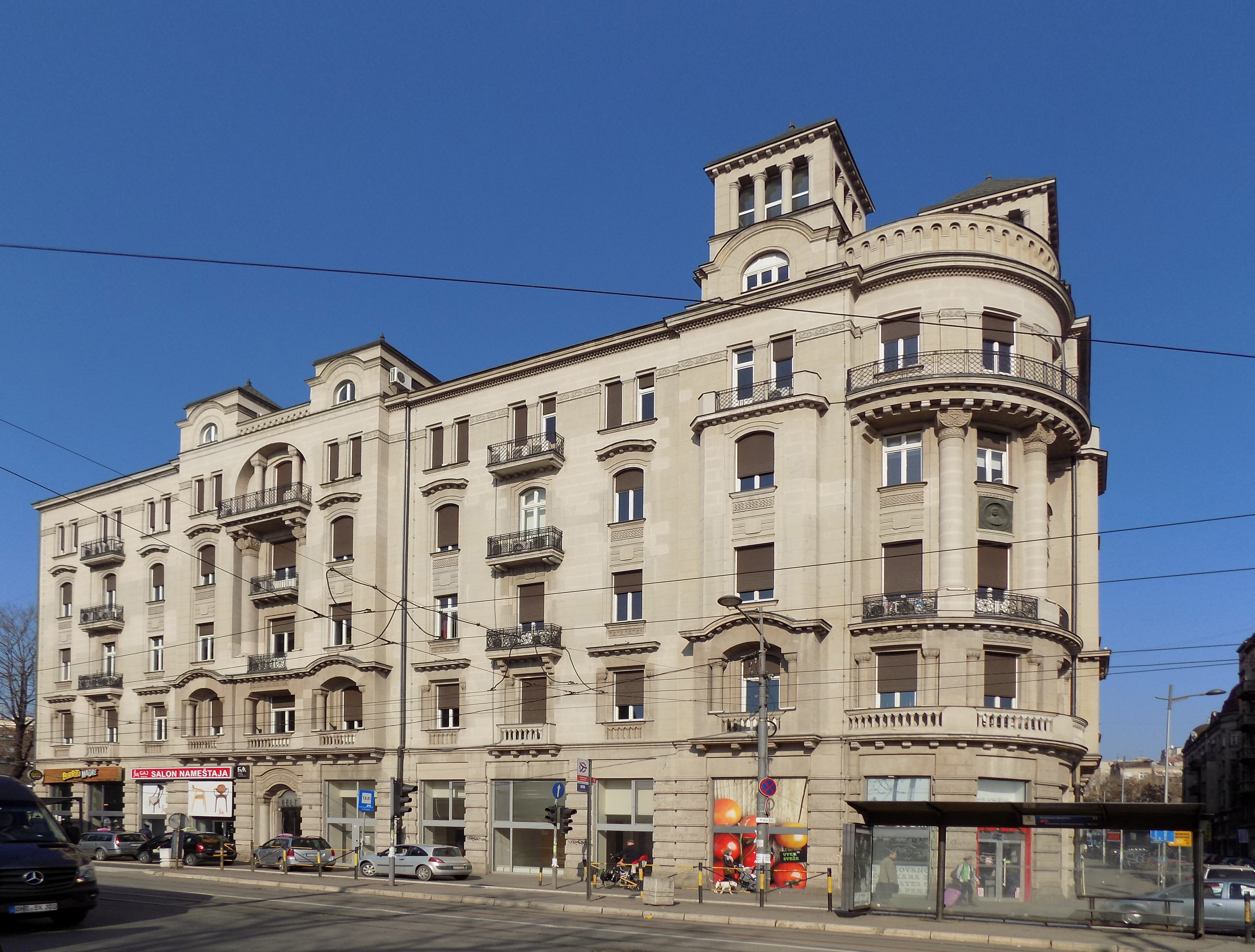
Ćelović's endowment in Belgrade

Ćelović was indirectly linked with Serbian combat in Macedonian Struggle, by financially helping troops to organize. In fact, Dr. Gođevac established a society which financially aided and recruited men for what became known as the "Četnik Campaign." The first president was Luka Ćelović and the other leaders of the campaign were Vasa Jovanović, Ljubomir Kovačević, Žika Rafajlović and Nikola Spasić. The men solicited for the cause, and Luka Ćelović donated the enormous sum of 50,000 dinars annually to the Četnik Campaign.

A street in Belgrade is named after him.

== Donator ==
In his will Ćelović left almost all of his property to the University of Belgrade. Besides, he has founded an endowment named "A Foundation of Luka Ćelović – Trebinjac".

== See also ==
- Đorđe Vajfert
- Miša Anastasijević
- Nikola Spasić
- Stanojlo Petrović
- Marija Trandafil
- Sava Tekelija
