= Babunski =

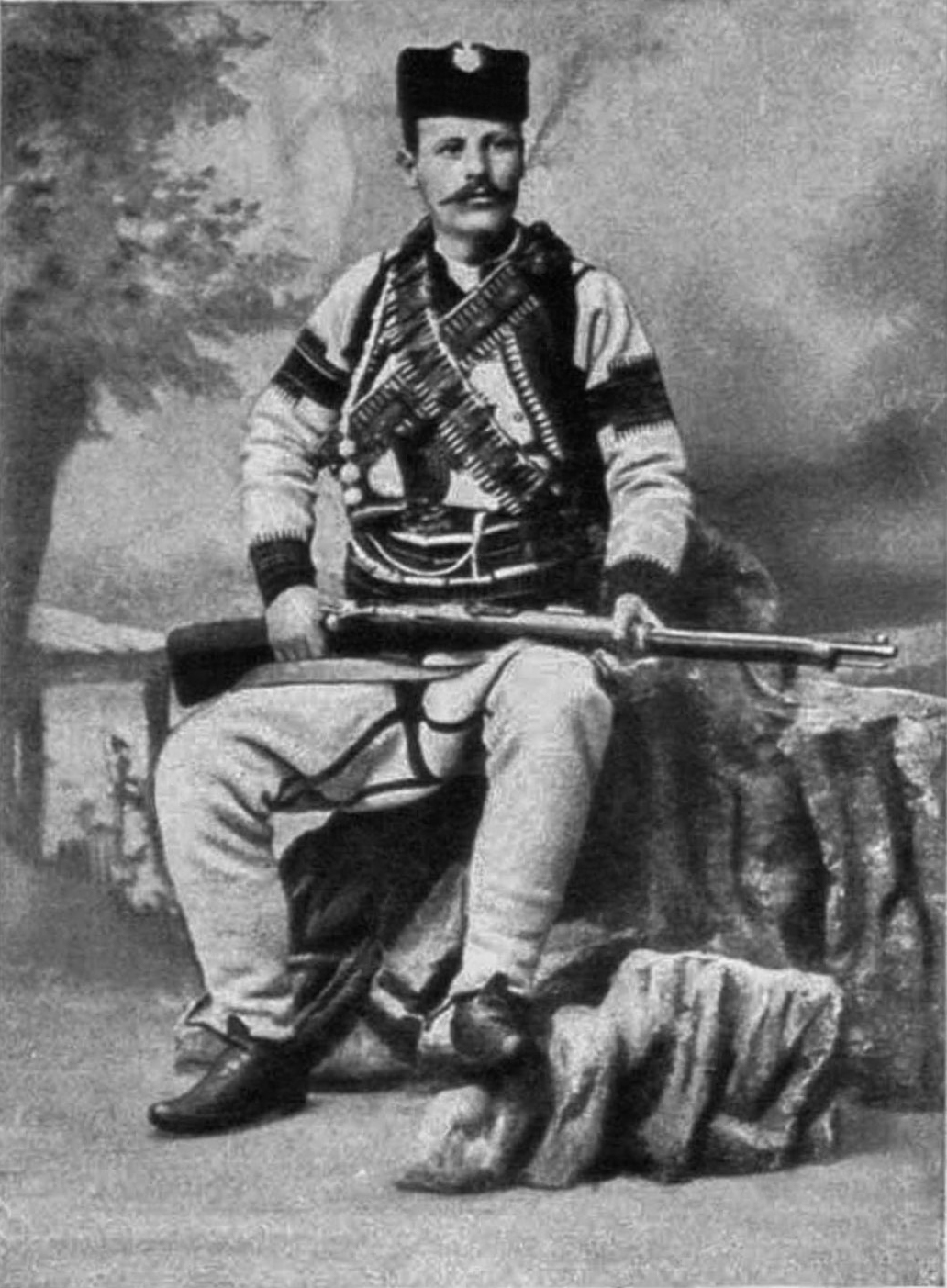
The surname originated from Jovan Babunski.

Babunski (Cyrillic: Бабунски) is a Macedonian surname, a toponymic surname derived from the Babuna mountain near Veles. It was adopted as a surname by the descendants of Serbian Chetnik vojvoda Jovan Stojković, from his nom de guerre (or "Chetnik name") "Babunski". Jovan is the great-grandfather of Danijela Babunski, footballer Boban Babunski, who in turn is the father of brothers David and Dorian. People with the surname include:

- Jovan Babunski (1878–1920), Macedonian Serb Chetnik leader
- Boban Babunski, Macedonian footballer
- David Babunski, Macedonian footballer
- Dorian Babunski, Macedonian footballer
