= Battle on the Oreške fields =

Part of the Macedonian struggle (1905)

- Part of the Macedonian Struggle
Date	10 May 1905
Location	Oreške, near Bogomila, Ottoman Empire (modern-day North Macedonia)
Result	Serbian victory
Territorial changes	Bulgarian retreat from western Vardar

Belligerents
Serbian Chetnik Organization	Bulgarian committees

Commanders and leaders
Jovan Babunski; Trenko Rujanović; Captain Rajković	Stefan Dimitrov (WIA)

Strength
Unknown	50 Committees

Casualties and losses
None	15 killed and 30 wounded 45 guns captured

The Battle on the Oreške fields was a battle between Serbian Chetniks from Macedonia and Macedonian Bulgarians in the area of western Vardar that took place on May 10, 1905. The battle resulted in a decisive Chetnik victory and the destruction of the Bulgarian committee company of Stefan Dimitrov.

== Background ==
The event took place a month after the crossing of Serbian companies across the Serbian-Ottoman border. The company of captains Rajković and Jovan Babunski skillfully avoided unnecessary conflicts with Bulgarian companies and Turkish pursuits. The companies met near Prilep together with the company of Gligor Sokolović and Trenko Rujanović. Gligor's and Trenko's companies were armed with outdated berdankas and martinkas, so they were forced to avoid clashes with large Bulgarian companies armed with modern mannlicher rifles.

== Battle ==
The company of Jovan Babunski was chased by the Bulgarian company of Stefan Dimitrov. The fear of the Bulgarian committees was so great that the inhabitants of Veles Azot begged Babunski not to enter their villages because of the Bulgarian threats. After the murder of two Serbs, the Bulgarians planned the murder of Pope Atanas and Temeljek from Oraov Dol. The same fate was intended for David Dimitrijević, the manager of Serbian schools in Veleš. As a result of those actions, Rajković decided to destroy Stefan Dimitrov's company which consisted of about 50 soldiers, which was located on the mountain above Oreš (Between Veleš and Poreče ), with the companies of Gligor, Trenko and Babunski.

On May 10 of 1905, while the unarmored Bulgarian company was resting in the Oreske meadows, it was silently surrounded by Serbian Chetniks. Half of the Chetniks, led by Gligor, took up positions above the Bulgarian company. The other half with Rajković, Babunski and Trenk was located below the Bulgarian company, in the beech forest. Gligor's group above the Bulgarians opened fire on the surprised commies, who ran to escape into the forest, where they were met by the fire of other Chetniks. Stefan Dimitrov then rushed towards the wood where Rajković, Babunski and Trenko stationed to start the fight. In the fighting that soon ensured, the Bulgarian committees were defeated, and Stefan Dimitrov was wounded.

== Conclusion ==
The Serbs had no losses in this battle, while 15 Bulgarians were killed, 30 wounded and only five escaped. 45 guns, as many rifles, company archives, ammunition, bombs, dynamite and a pharmacy were captured. Most importantly, the Serbian Chetniks received new Mannlicher rifles. With this battle, Captain Rajković began his career as one the most successful heads of the Serbian Chetnik Organization during the Macedonian struggle, thereby pushing the Bulgarians out of western Povardarje.
