= Serbian secret organization in eastern Bosnia (1849–1855) =

- Formation: second half of 1849
- Type: secret revolutionary organization
- Location: Užice (HQ)
- Key people: Pavle Marinović

The Serbian secret organization in eastern Bosnia (Serbian: Српска тајна организација у источној Босни/Srpska tajna organizacija u istočnoj Bosni) was a Serb secret revolutionary organization active in 1849–55 in the eastern Bosnia Eyalet–the kaza of Srebrenica, Višegrad, Rogatica and Nova Varoš. It was part of a larger network of organizations active in Ottoman Europe (Rumelia), envisaged by Serbian politician Ilija Garašanin. The aim of the organization was to prepare an uprising against Ottoman rule. Pavle Marinović was responsible for eastern Bosnia, and was subordinated to Toma Kovačević, Garašanin's man responsible for Bosnia as a whole. Marinović established the organization network in the four kazas in eastern Bosnia in the second half of 1849 and in 1850, and appointed chiefs of each kaza that reported on numbers of Orthodox and Muslim men, the relief, strategical objects and Ottoman military forces. It was concluded that half of the Serb population there were well-armed and ready to revolt. However, as Serbia did not pursue a war of liberation against the Ottomans, in 1851 the organization turned into an intelligence agency. The organization's failure was largely due to lack of funds.

== Members ==
The following were members whose names and duties are known:

- Pavle Marinović, organizer;
- Vuk Nešković, chief in Višegrad kaza;
- Sava Jovičić, chief in Višegrad kaza, also duty in Nova Varoš;
- Filip Ravanac, chief in Srebrenica kaza;
- Petar Borovčan, chief in Srebrenica kaza;
- Ilija Borovčan, chief in Srebrenica kaza;
- Nikola, chief in Srebrenica kaza;
- Mihailo Soldat, chief in Srebrenica kaza;
- Marko, priest of Lipovac, chief in Vlasenica kaza;
- Ilija, priest of Glasinac, chief in Glasinac kaza.

== See also ==
- Serb revolutionary organizations
- Secret society

== Sources ==
- Jagodić, Miloš (2016). "SERBIAN SECRET ORGANISATION IN EASTERN BOSNIA (1849-1855)". Istraživanja. 27: 190–199. Archived from the original on 2017-12-03.
- Stranjaković, D. (1936). Politička propaganda Srbije u jugoslovenskim pokrajinama 1844-1858. godine. Beograd.
- Stojančevic, Vladimir (1972). "Да ли је било политичке акције Србије у Босни за ослобођење од турске власти пре Гарашаниновог "Начертанија"?". Историјски часопис. 19: 164–184.
