= Battles for Vuksan and Matejče =

1905 military clashes between Serbian and Albanian forces

Battles of Vuksan and Matejče
- Part of the Macedonian Struggle
Date	30 April 1905
Location	Vuksan and Matejče, North Macedonia
Result	Chetnik retreat

Belligerents
Serbian Chetnik Organization	(Ottoman Empire) Kumanovo garrison

Commanders and leaders
Kosta Pećanac	Unknown

Strength
35	Unknown, much larger

Casualties and losses
4 dead, unknown wounded	(Ottoman Empire) 40 dead and wounded (Serb claim)

The Battles of Vuksan and Matejče were a series of clashes that occurred on 30 April 1905 between Serbian Chetnik forces and the Ottoman army.

While moving towards Matejče, Kosta Pećanac's company was ambushed and surrounded an Ottoman army, which was equipped with mountain artillery. The fight lasted until deep into the night, when the Chetniks broke through the encirclement without casualties. According to Kosta Pećanac, 4 Chetniks were killed (Jovan Đorđević, Aleksa Šagović, Trajko Zafirović and Petar Sirinćanin) while the Ottomans had 40 men dead and wounded.
