= Velimir Karić =

Serbian revolutionary and politician

Velimir Karić (Kragujevac, Principality of Serbia, 3 October 1859 - Belgrade, 1946) was a Serbian revolutionary, a People's Radical Party representative in the parliament of the Kingdom of Serbia, a pharmacist, a volunteer in the liberation wars of 1876-1878 against the Ottoman Empire, a member of the founding group of the Serbian Chetnik Organization in Vranje.

== Biography ==
Velimir Karić was born in Kragujevac in 1859 in a well-to-do clerical family. He finished high school in Šabac, and the Faculty of Pharmacy in Vienna. During the Serbian-Turkish Wars (1876-1878), he fought as a volunteer on the Drina River. Like his brother Vladimir, Velimir was one of the first members of the Radical Party, and with radicals, he participated in protests, including one in 1882 against Victorien Sardou's Rabagas performance at the National Theatre in Belgrade. After the protest in Belgrade he went to Vranje where he opened the first pharmacy in the newly-formed municipal regions in 1883. In 1903 Velimir participated in the creation of the Executive Committee of the Serbian Chetnik Organization in Vranje and became a member of the same committee. He took an active part in the Chetnik movement until 1906 when he left Vranje for Belgrade where he opened another pharmacy. He was elected ten times as deputy of the People's Radical Party for Vranje and was a member of its board of directors until 1940. He is one of the earliest members of the Narodna Odbrana, and also held the post of its president during the Great War.

== See also ==
- List of Chetnik voivodes
