= Nikola Spasić =

Serbian businessman, benefactor, humanitarian

Nikola Spasić Никола Спасић
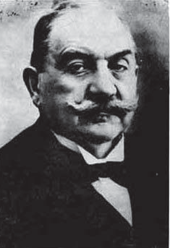
- Photo of Spasić
- Born: 2 November 1838; Belgrade, Principality of Serbia
- Died: 28 November 1916 (aged 78); Corfu, Kingdom of Greece
- Occupation: businessman
- Awards: Order of the Cross of Takovo

Nikola Spasić (Serbian Cyrillic: Никола Спасић; 2 November 1838 in Belgrade – 28 November 1916 in Corfu) was a Serbian businessman, benefactor, humanitarian, and one of the leaders of the Serbian Chetnik Organization in Old Serbia and Macedonia. He was the president of the Board of Directors of the Belgrade Exchange in 1903 and the initiator-founder-builder of the Nikola Spasić Endowment Building in Belgrade, which had a slightly bigger founding capital then the Nobel Foundation. He also initiated and financed the construction of four major edifices in Knez Mihailova Street, the third of which were built immediately after the First Balkan War, such as the Grand Passage, designed by Nikola Nestorović.

== Biography ==
Nikola Spasić was born to a poor Serbian family which moved to Belgrade from the countryside during the 1804-1813 First Serbian Uprising against the Ottoman Empire. Spasić trained as an artisan and merchant before opening a leather workshop and store in 1865 alongside his brother. The shop manufactured and sold opanci (Opanak), a Balkan peasant footwear similar to the moccasin which was widely accepted as part of the Serbian national costume and was worn in the 19th century both in the city and the village. By the time of the Kingdom of Serbia acquired full independence in 1878, Spasić had accumulated enough wealth to retire. The value of the property that the Endowment of Nikola Spasić had at its disposal following his death was close to that of the Nobel Foundation.

In Belgrade, Spasić is remembered for his professionalism and humanitarian work. For the architectural design of his buildings, Spasić developed a reputation for selecting the most accomplished Serbian architects. His buildings featured the latest technical devices, the construction material of the highest quality, with the entire building inventory procured from European centres.

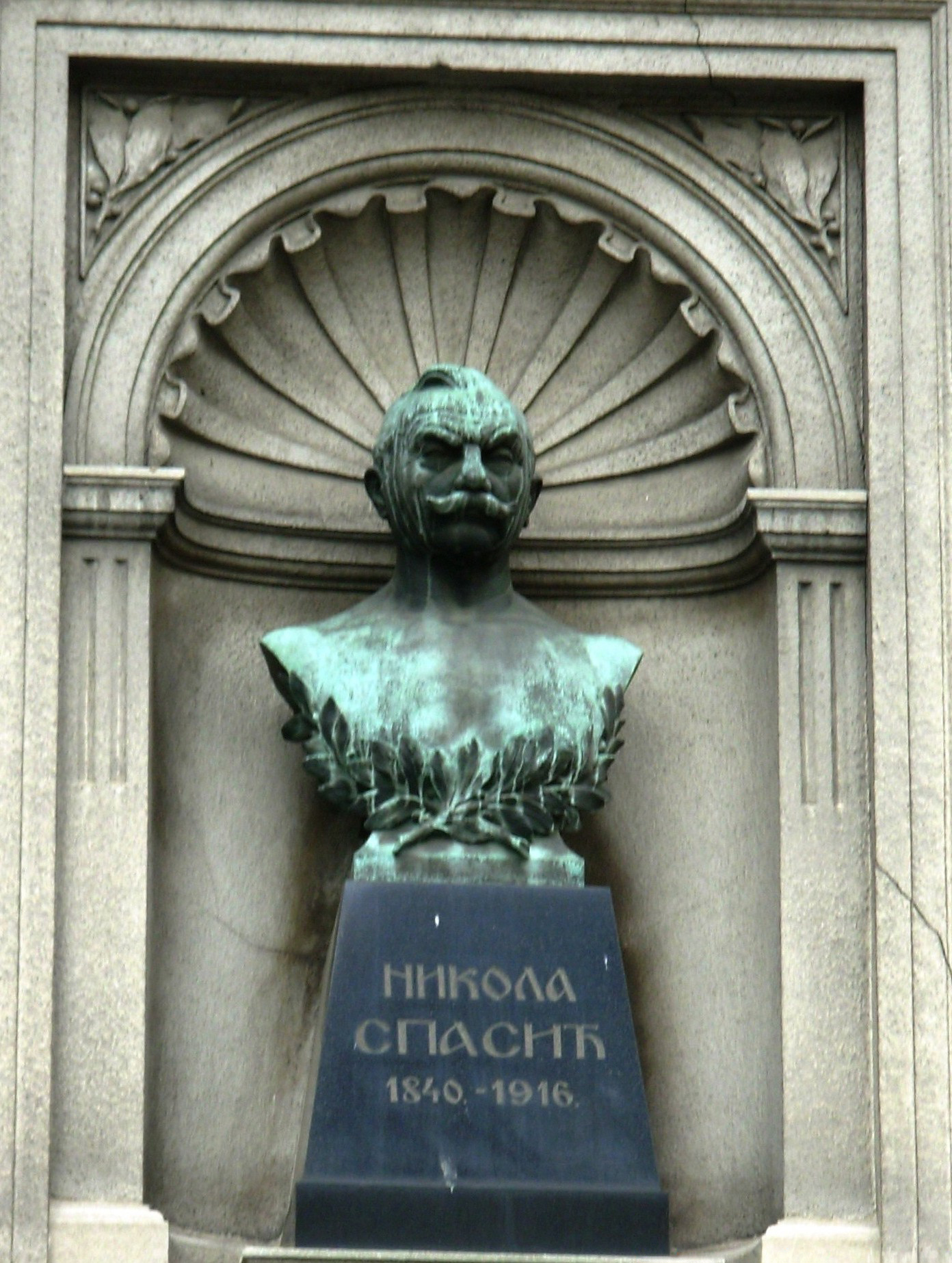
Bust of Nikola Spasić on the Nikola Spasić Endowment Building in Belgrade

Nikola Spasić's will and last testament, drawn up in 1912, expressly forbade the sale of any of his Belgrade buildings. Instead, it called for their exploitation in order to raise funds and therefore finance all the undertakings of the Endowment of Nikola Spasić. The main goal of the endowment set by Spasić was the economic development of the nation.

Only a few days before his death on the island of Corfu, where he arrived as a war refugee, Spasić revealed in a letter, his hope that he would return one day to liberated Belgrade, accompanied by Viennese architect Konstantin Jovanović, with whom he planned to engage to design new remarkable edifices.

== See also ==
- List of Chetnik voivodes
- Luka Ćelović
- Đorđe Vajfert
- Stanojlo Petrović
- Miša Anastasijević
- Marija Trandafil
- Sava Tekelija
- Sava Vukovic (merchant)

== Sources ==
- "Biografija". Zadužbina Nikole Spasića.
- "Никола Спасић био јачи чак и од Нобела". Novosti.
- "Велики задужбинар Никола Спасић". RTS.
