= Jovan Ćirković =

Serbian revolutionary and politician (1871–1928)

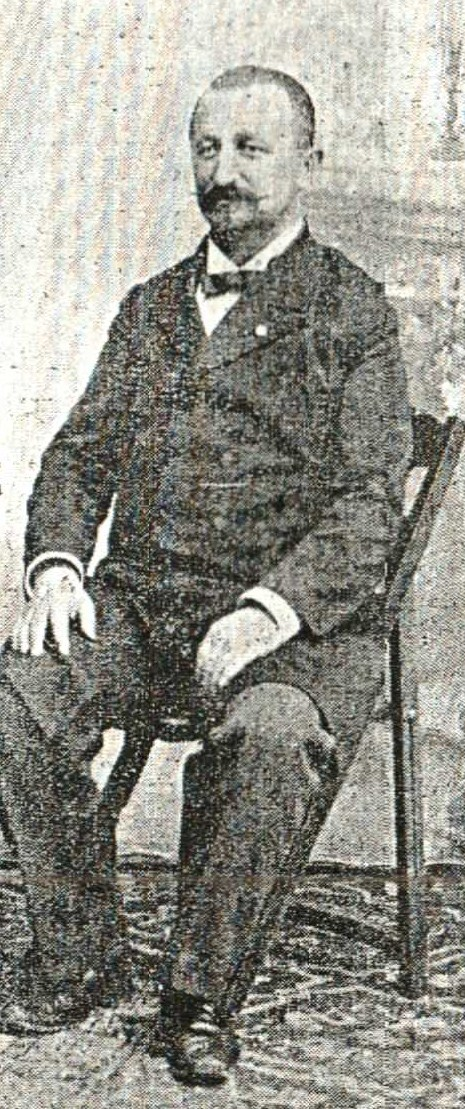
- Jovan Ćirković
- Born: 1871; Pljevlja, Ottoman Empire (now Montenegro)
- Died: 1928 (aged 56–57)
- Military career
- Allegiance: Serbian Chetnik Organization (1903–08)
- Service years: 1903–08
- Rank: Voivode (Vojvoda)
- Conflicts: Macedonian Serb Struggle

Jovan Ćirković (Serbian Cyrillic: Јован Ћирковић; 1871 – 1928), known as Čifa (Чифа) or Ćirko-paša (Ћирко-паша), was a Serbian teacher, revolutionary (Chetnik) during the Macedonian Struggle, and politician.

== Life ==
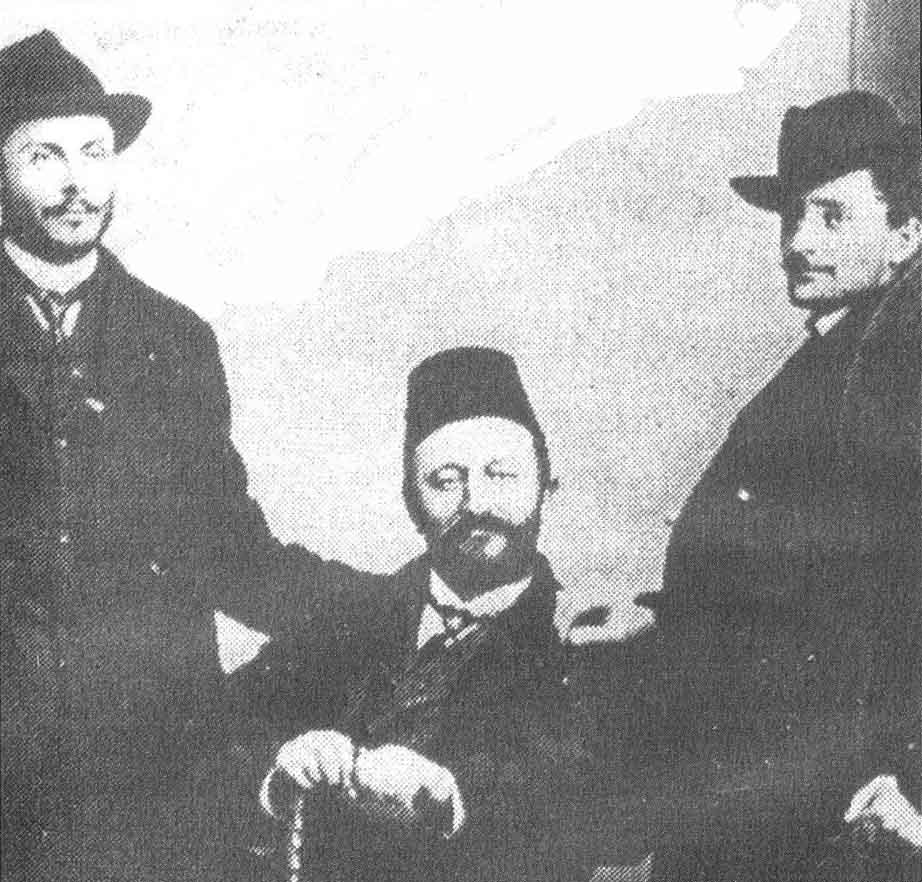
Jovan Ćirković and Vojislav Tankosić, mission to Kosovo, 1903

Ćirković was born in Pljevlja, Ottoman Empire (now Montenegro), into a Serbian Orthodox family. He finished primary school in his hometown. He graduated from the Teacher's College of the Society of Saint Sava in 1891, and worked as a teacher in the surroundings of Pljevlja, in Kumanovo, Tetovo, Skoplje, Veles and Prilep. He was also a superintendent and inspector of Serbian schools in the Manastir Vilayet (Bitola). Since 1901 he was secretary of the Patriarchatic Veles-Debar bishop Polikarp.

In 1903, he and Aleksa Jovanović-Kodža established the Bitola Board of the Serbian Chetnik Organization, in which he would have the task of forming, supplying, managing and coordination of Serb bands (četa) in the Bitola Vilayet. After the Young Turk Revolution (1908), he became the president of the Serb National Board of the Manastir Vilayet, a post he held until 1910 when he was appointed head of the Serbian National Office in Istanbul. After the Balkan Wars, he became the head of the Ohrid Oblast (region), and after the First World War, the head of the Oblast of Bitola (1918). He was an MP from 1920 to 1927 in the Bitola Okrug.
