= Jovan Babunski =

Serbian Chetnik commander (1878–1920)

vojvoda Jovan Babunski
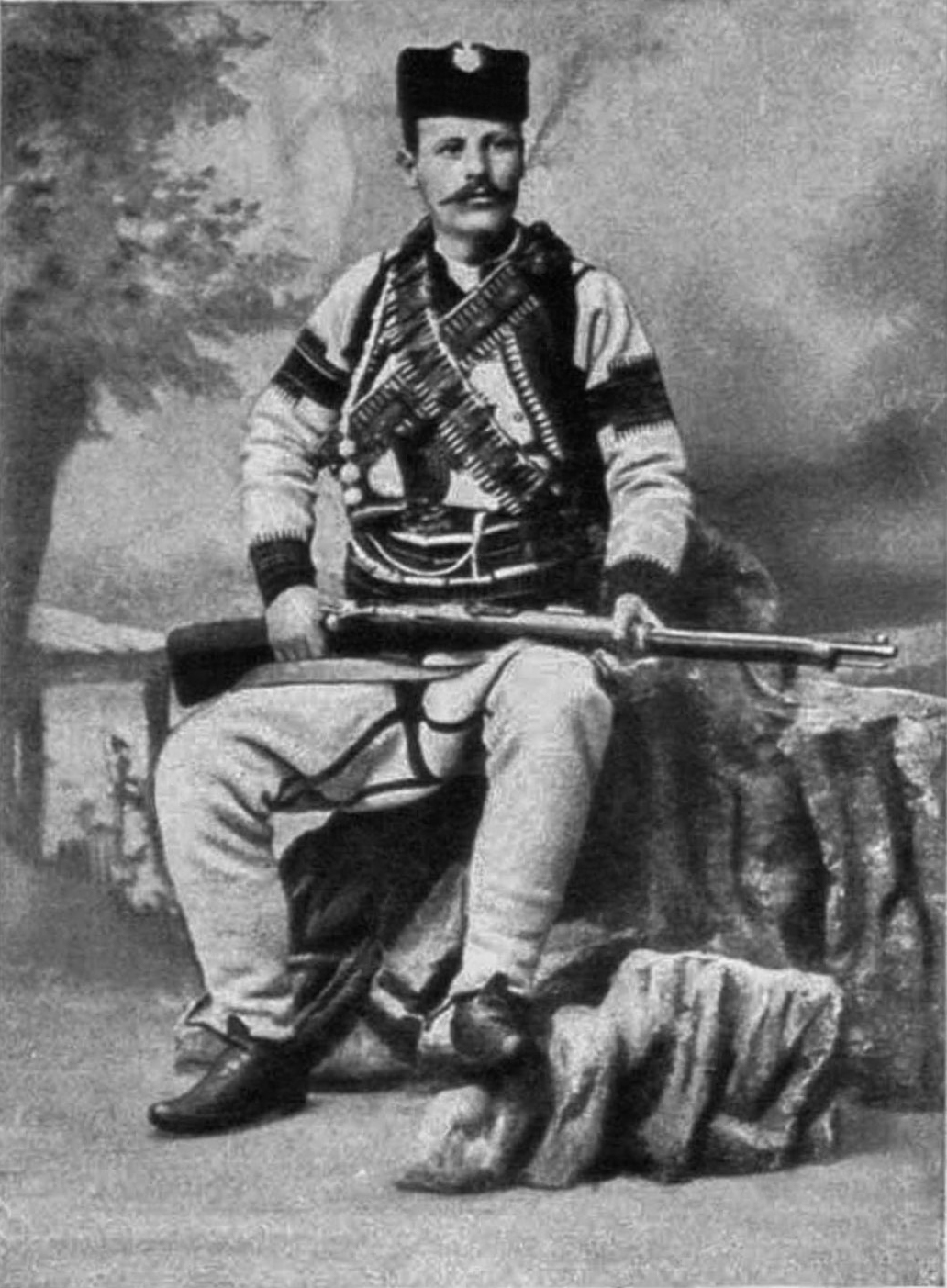
- Born: Jovan Stojković; 25 December 1878; Martolci, Ottoman Empire
- Died: 17 February 1920 (aged 41); Veles, Kingdom of Serbs, Croats and Slovenes
- Military career
- Allegiance: Chetniks (1905–1920); Kingdom of Serbia (1908–1918); Kingdom of Serbs, Croats and Slovenes (1918–1920)
- Service years: 1905–1920
- Rank: vojvoda
- Nickname: Babunski
- Conflicts: Macedonian Struggle; First Balkan War; Second Balkan War: Battle of Bregalnica; World War I: Serbian Front; Salonika front
- Awards: Order of the Star of Karađorđe

Jovan Stojković (Serbian Cyrillic: Јован Стојковић; 25 December 1878 – 17 February 1920), known as Jovan Babunski (Јован Бабунски), was a Serbian Chetnik commander (Serbian: vojvoda / војвода) during the Macedonian Struggle, Balkan Wars and World War I. Following the murder of his brother and nephew by the Internal Macedonian Revolutionary Organization (IMRO), he joined a Chetnik band and took command of Chetnik units on the Vardar River, where he and his men often engaged Bulgarian and Ottoman forces.

With the outbreak of the First Balkan War he joined the Serbian Army and was wounded while fighting in the village of Strevica. During the Second Balkan War, he joined a Serbian volunteer detachment and fought at the Battle of Bregalnica. During World War I, Babunski and his Chetnik detachment fought Austro-Hungarian forces in the summer of 1914 and later fought on the Salonika front, where Babunski was ordained by French General Louis Franchet d'Espèrey after he and his men captured two German midget submarines and their crews. After the war, Babunski and his 250-strong force helped Serb authorities suppress Bulgarian resistance in the Macedonian towns of Bitola and Tikveš, committing several atrocities in the process. Considered one of the most famous Chetnik commanders of his time, Babunski died in Veles in February 1920.

== Early life ==
Jovan Stojković was born in the village of Martolci in present-day central North Macedonia, at the foot of Mount Babuna, near Veles, on 25 December 1878. In his youth, he was nicknamed "Babunski", by which he was referred to for the rest of his life. He began attending Bulgarian primary school at the age of 10 as Ivan Stoykov. Later Babunski's father took his son to the Serbian consulate in Skopje and requested that he be transferred to a primary school in Belgrade. Babunski's primary and secondary education took place in Belgrade, Valjevo and Niš. In his twenties, he worked as a school teacher in Tetovo and Veles.

== Guerrilla activities ==
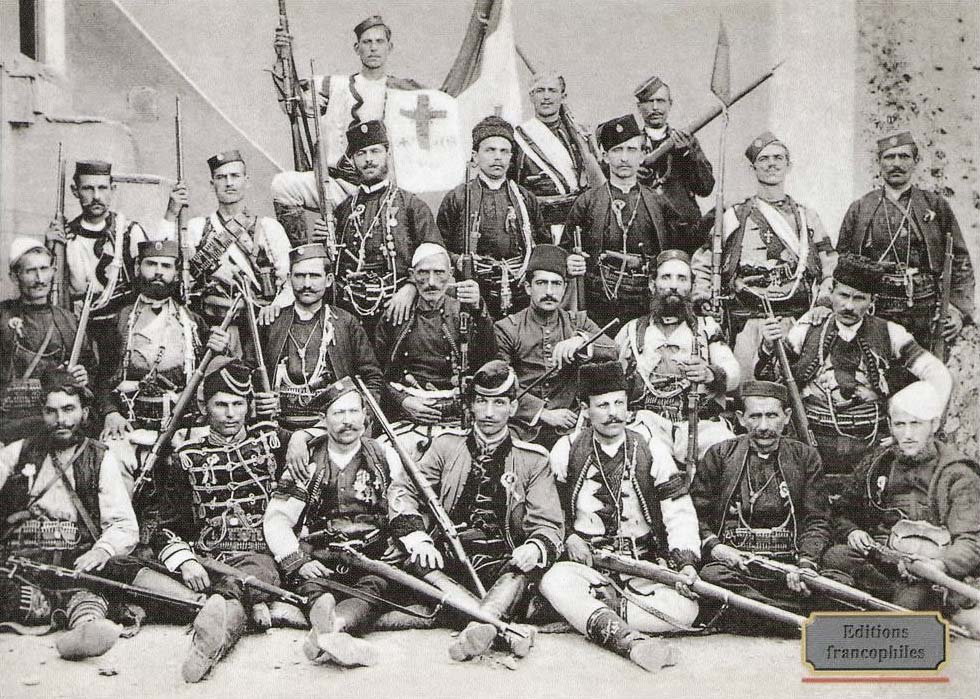
Babunski (first row, third from right) with a group of Chetniks, during Macedonian Civil War 1903–08

In 1905, Babunski's brother and nephew were killed by the Internal Macedonian Revolutionary Organization (Bulgarian: Вътрешна Македонска Революционна Организация; IMRO). Seeking revenge, he joined the Chetnik band of Gligor Sokolović and Temeljko Barjaktarević. That year, he became a Chetnik vojvoda. Afterwards, he defended the right bank of the Vardar River against Bulgarian insurgents and protected persecuted Serb villages against Bulgarian and Ottoman attacks. This prompted the IMRO to place a bounty of 20,000 leva on his head.

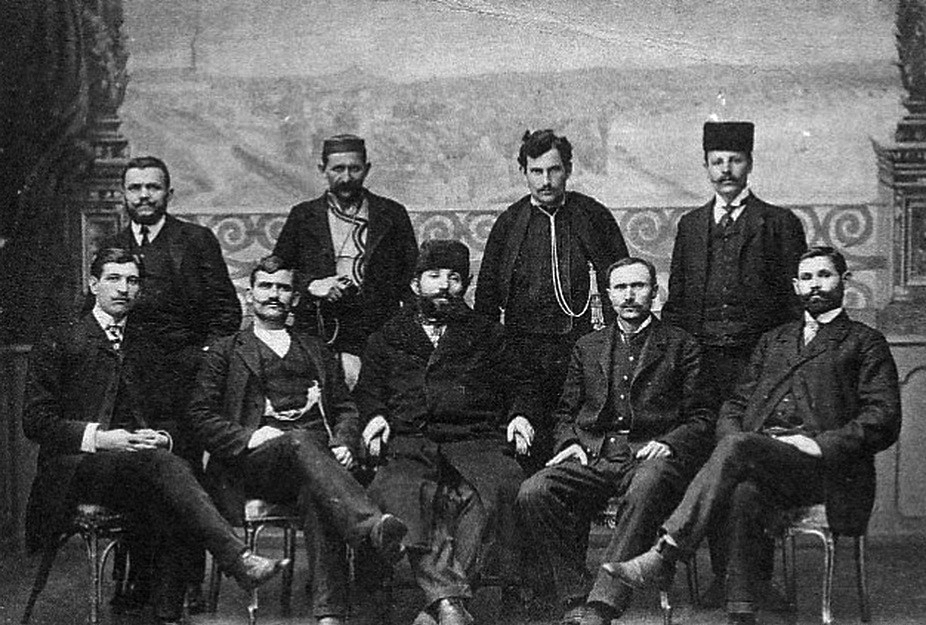
Chetnik leaders during legalisation in time of Young Turk Revolution in 1908. Babunski is seen standing, first from right.

Through these actions, Babunski became one of the five leading Serbian guerrilla chiefs in Macedonia. Babunski's participation in the struggle against the Ottomans and Bulgarians came at a great personal cost; his wife was tortured to disclose his whereabouts and one of his children was killed. With the Young Turk Revolution in 1908, the Ottomans declared a ceasefire between their forces and those of the Chetniks. Babunski left the Chetniks' ranks and returned to civilian life. He was later arrested by the Ottoman authorities, but quickly escaped from prison. That year, he returned to the Serbia.

Babunski fought with the Royal Serbian Army during the First Balkan War and was wounded in a skirmish with Ottoman Turkish forces in the village of Strevica while serving under commander Vojin Popović. During the Second Balkan War, he fought with a Serbian volunteer detachment at the Battle of Bregalnica.

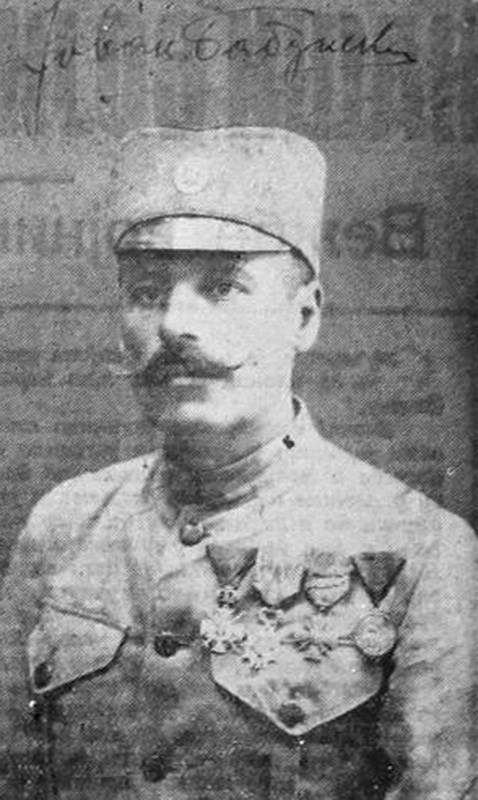
Babunski in Salonika, 1918.

Following the outbreak of World War I, Babunski formed the Sava Chetnik detachment, which was placed under the command of Major Vojislav Tankosić. The unit suffered its first casualties when Austro-Hungarian river monitors shelled Belgrade on the night of 28 July 1914, killing a 16-year-old Chetnik volunteer named Dušan Đonović, the first victim of the war. Shortly afterwards, Babunski's Chetniks destroyed a railway bridge on the Sava to prevent the Austro-Hungarians from crossing. Babunski and his men returned to Macedonia in 1915 and fought Bulgarian guerrillas. At the beginning of 1915 Babunski became the first Commander of the Vardar Detachment, a tactical-operational unit belonging to the Serbian Army Vardar Division, but allowed to operate independently. The formation of 1,640 members, later increased to 5,898, was led by Serb officers and non-commissioned officers and composed of Macedonians soldiers. The unit was located in the eastern parts of the Vardar part of Macedonia, in the area of Kratovo, Ovche Pole, Kočani, assigned to secure the border against Bulgarian's incursions, often clashing with IMRO chetas.

That autumn Babunski and his Chetniks were assigned to the town of Kačanik, where they joined other Serbian forces in fighting a Bulgarian division that they managed to hold to a standstill for nearly a month despite suffering heavy losses. With the Serbian army's retreat through Albania that winter, Babunski and his men withdrew to the Greek island of Corfu. They then joined Serb forces at the Salonika front. Here, Babunski was assigned to the Serbian First Army and was involved in guarding Lake Prespa from the Bulgarians. Later, he and his Chetnik detachments participated in capturing enemy soldiers and gathering intelligence from the front. In 1917, French General Louis Franchet d'Espèrey awarded Babunski a medal following the capture of two German midget submarines and their crews by him and his men. Babunski was also a recipient of the Order of the Star of Karađorđe.

== Later life and legacy ==
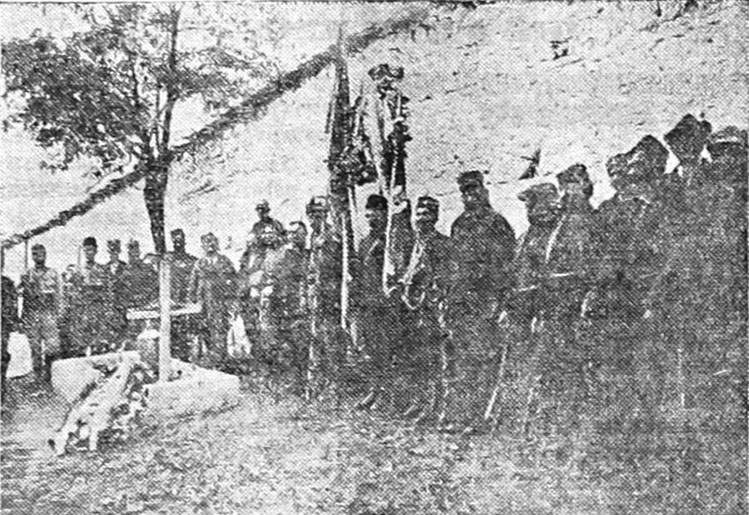
Babunski's Chetniks by his grave.

After the war, Babunski's Chetniks were dispatched to Kosovo and Macedonia, reinforcing the 50,000 soldiers that had been deployed to quell the armed uprisings there. Babunski's force of 250 men helped the authorities suppress resistance in the towns of Bitola and Tikveš, targeting locals sympathetic to the Bulgarian komitas, and committing several atrocities in the process. Forces under his command also committed several atrocities in Albania. Chetnik bands, including those of Babunski, are also said to have enslaved locals and turned them into forced labourers for the armed forces of the Kingdom of Serbs, Croats and Slovenes. By the summer of 1919, the authorities had decided that paramilitary formations such as Babunski's were not "furthering the state's aims in the region". Babunski died in Veles on 17 February 1920, after contracting influenza. The historian Dušan T. Bataković characterized Babunski as "exceptionally courageous and determined". John Paul Newman, a historian specializing in Yugoslavia's interwar paramilitary formations, believes Babunski would have become one of the most powerful figures in the interwar Chetnik Association had it not been for his premature demise. Babunski was celebrated as a national hero following his death and featured heavily in veterans' commemorations during the interwar period. A monument dedicated to him was constructed in Veles in 1924, but was destroyed by Bulgarian occupational authorities during World War II, when Macedonia was annexed by Bulgaria following Yugoslavia's dismemberment by the Axis. The nom de guerre Babunski was adopted as a surname by his descendants.

== See also ==
- List of Chetnik voivodes
