= Nikola Spasić Endowment, Belgrade =

Nikola Spasić Endowment Building
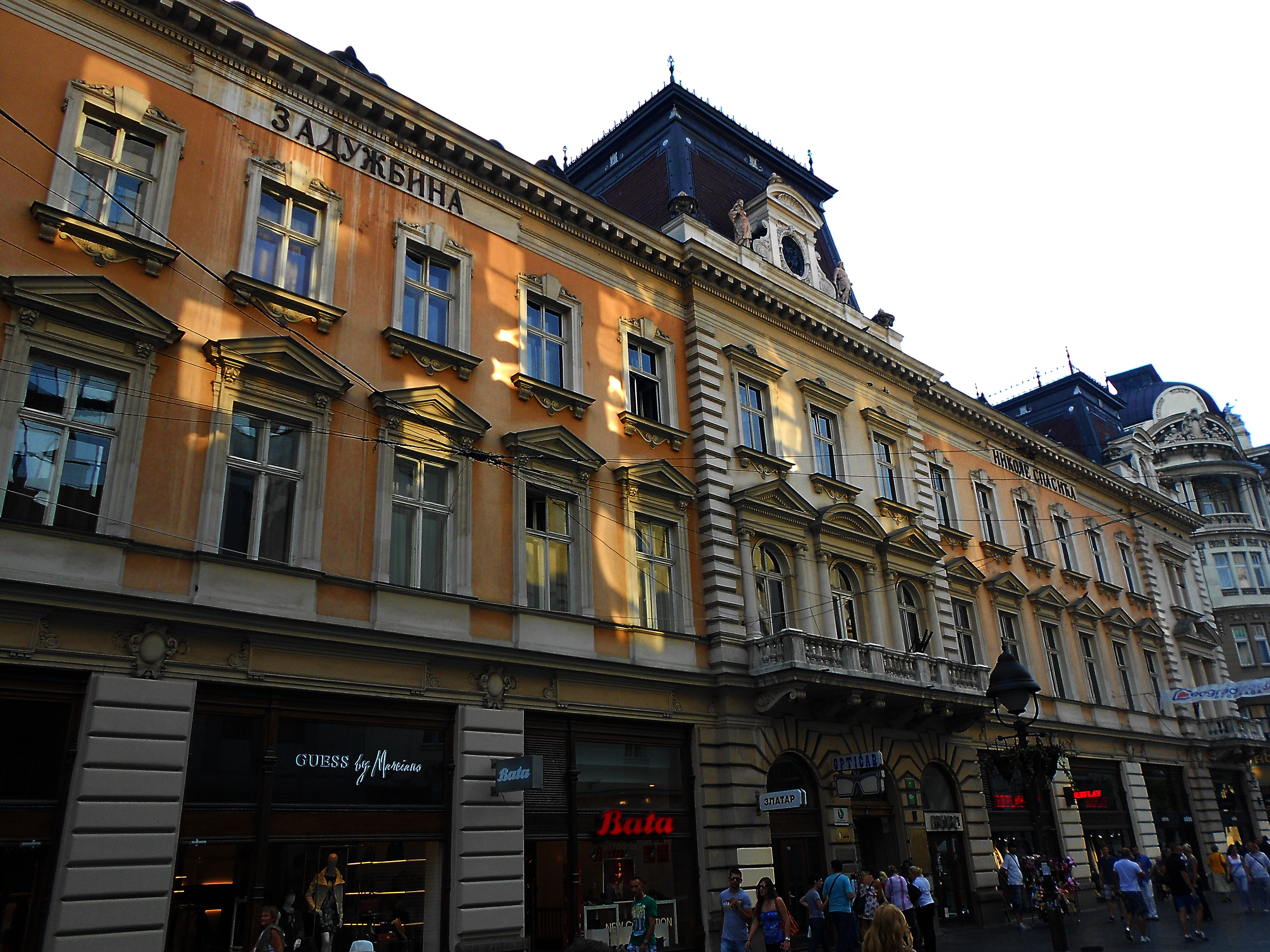
- Nikola Spasić Endowment Building, 33, Knez Mihailova Street Belgrade

- Location within Belgrade

General information
- Type: Cultural monument of exceptional importance
- Location: Belgrade, Serbia
- Coordinates: 44°49′03″N 20°27′24.8″E
- Completed: 1889

Nikola Spasić Endowment is building in Belgrade, located in Knez Mihailova Street. It was built in 1889 and it is a сultural monument of exceptional importance.

== Nikola Spasić ==
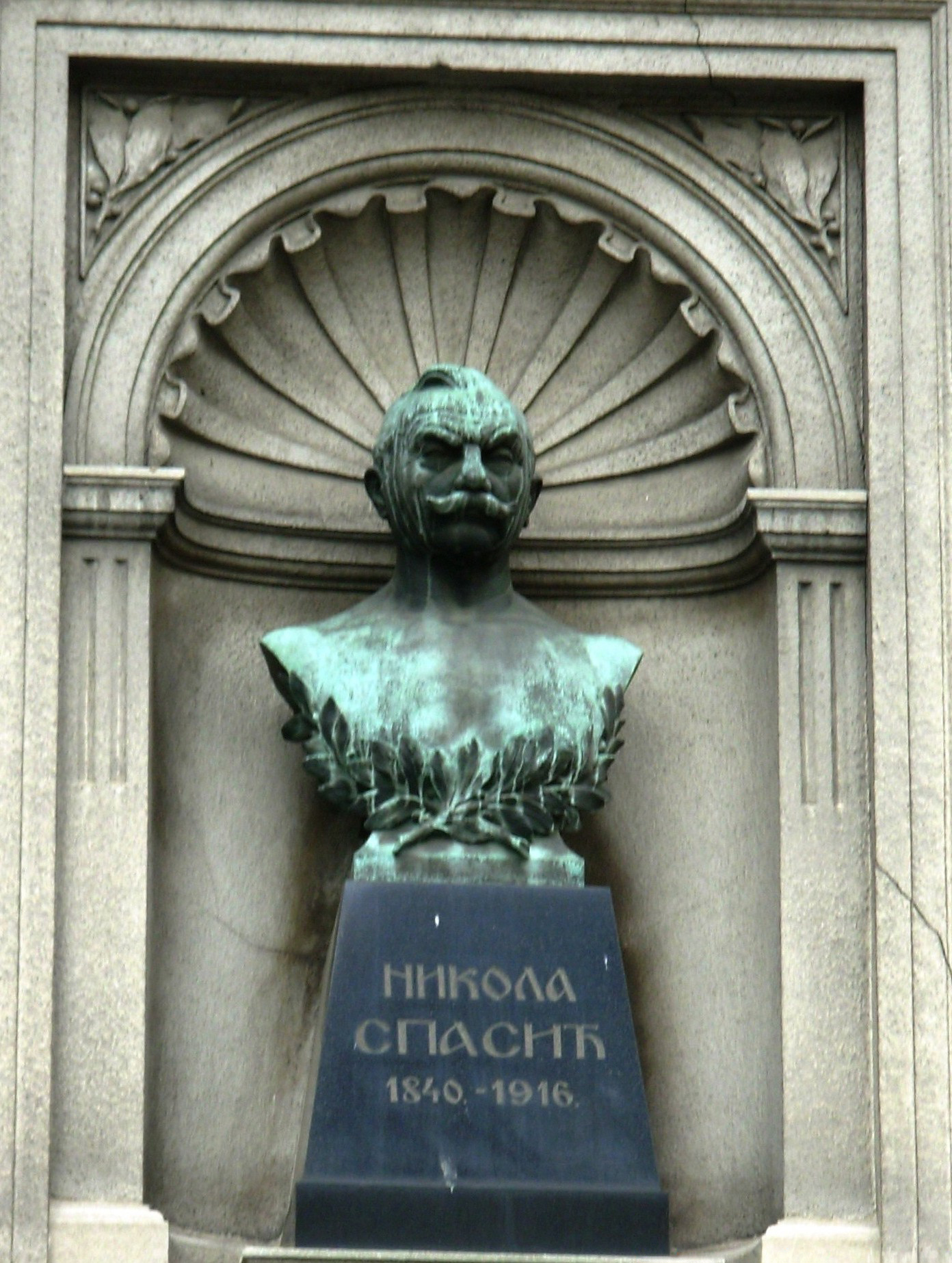
Bust of Nikola Spasić on the endowment-building in Knez Mihailova Street

Nikola Spasić (1838—1916) was a Serbian wholesaler, benefactor and a large endower. He was president of the Belgrade Stock Exchange, President of Traffic Bank and member of the management board of the National Bank of the Kingdom of Serbia. He was awarded the Cross of Takovo of the 4th order and the Order of St. Sava of the 3rd order.

== Appearance of the building ==
Main article: Nikola Spasić endowment

The building was built by Nikola Spasić, as a representative residential and commercial building with two floors, designed by architect Konstantin A. Jovanović. Shops were in the ground floor of the building and floors were designated to serve for housing. It has a basement, two floors, high attic and side wings that form a square courtyard. Project author Konstantin Jovanović conceived the basis of the building in the form of the Cyrillic letter P. The Spasić family lived on the first floor while, as sources say, the second floor was rented to some of the prominent residents of Belgrade. The apartments were derived representatively, and the furniture and the material for the interior was imported from Vienna. In addition to the usual full walls, iron traverses were used in the construction of the building, and inter-floor surfaces are formed on the vaults that rely on traverses. Stairs are covered with natural stone, with cast iron railings. The entrance from Knez Mihailova Street was especially decoratively treated with a central corridor which is articulated with shallow pilasters, flowery capitals between which are painted landscapes and medallions with female busts.

The composition and processing of the facade is carried out in the best tradition of academic architectural expression with elements of neo-Renaissance style characteristics. The main facade is dominated by the central and the two lateral avant-corps, consistently balanced in the symmetrical division, finished by characteristic domes of square base. Exceptional harmonics is achieved by deliberate and a fine graded arrangement of decorative plastic, placed in a solid system of vertical and noted horizontal compositional scheme of classical forms, which is consistent with the structure of the whole building. In the full stylistic concept of the building, an unusual combination of two architectural terms was achieved, of harmonious shape of Italian Renaissance architecture, knowingly enriched by decorative roof which derives from the French Renaissance[7]. In addition to the standard repertory of decorative moldings in the form of cartouches, festoons, cornices, consoles, of special artistic value is the anthropomorphic plastic located in the central part of the roof of the building. It consists of two figures made from artificial stone, modeled on ancient sculpture. On the left of the richly decorated aedicule there is a figure of a woman with a wreath, and on the right, there is a man with the beam and snowplow. Construction work, strength of structural compositions, the richness and variety of materials, precision and quality of artistic handicraft realized in accordance with a high level of architectural and artistic results were achieved in this extraordinary Jovanović's work in the field of residential architecture of Belgrade, by the end of the last century. As a valuable and important object placed under protection as a cultural monument in 1961, and in 1979, it was declared cultural property of exceptional importance. Conservation works were performed in 1966, 1972 and 1997.

== See more ==
- List of cultural monuments in Belgrade
- Nikola Spasić Endowment
