= Jaša Prodanović =

Serbian politician and writer (1867–1948)

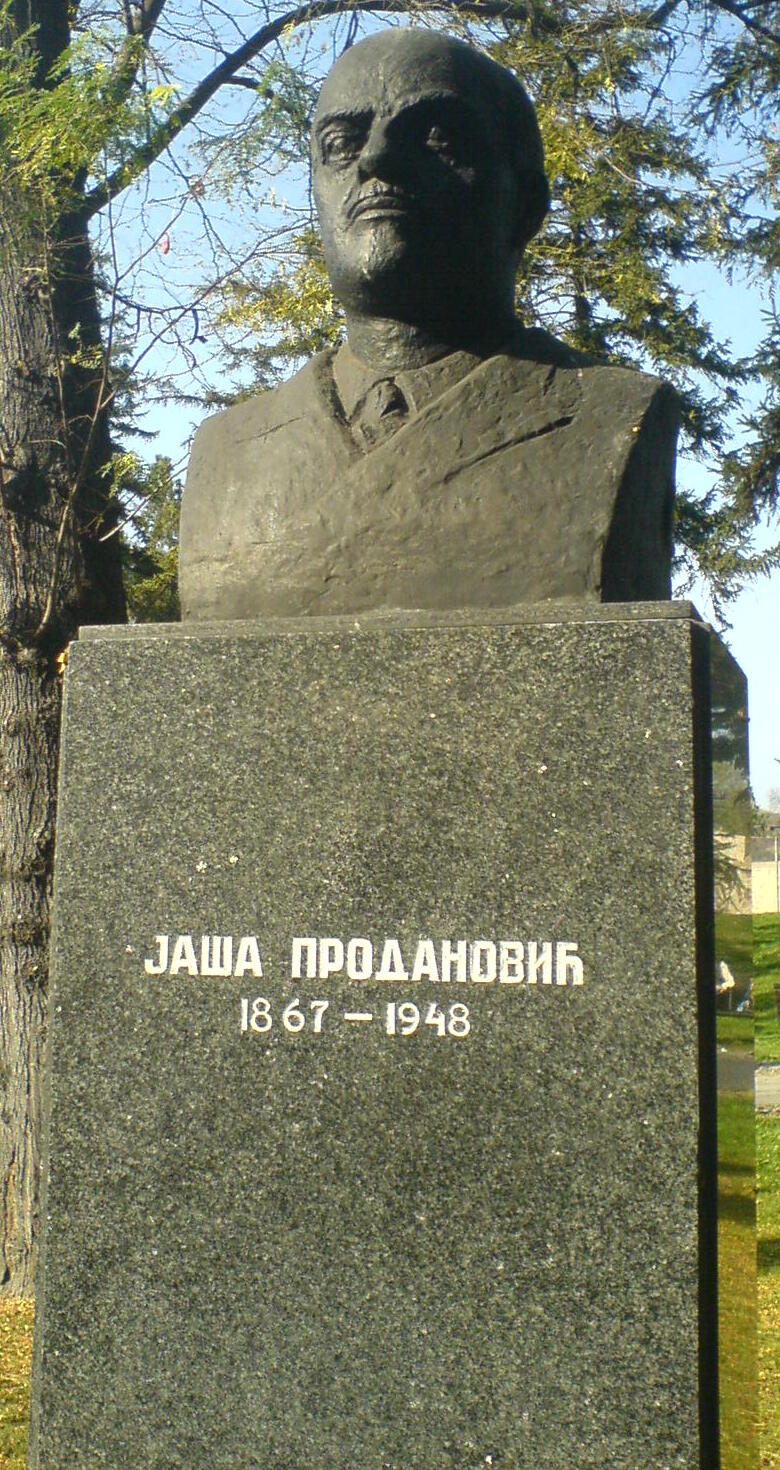
- A monument to Prodanović in Belgrade
- Born: Jakov Prodanović; 23 April 1867; Čačak, Principality of Serbia
- Died: 1 June 1948 (aged 81); Belgrade, PR Serbia, FPR Yugoslavia
- Occupations: Politician and writer

Jakov Prodanović (Serbian Cyrillic: Јаков Продановић; 23 April 1867 – 1 June 1948) was a Serbian politician and writer. He was one of the most prominent proponents of the ideas of republicanism and social justice in the Kingdom of Serbia and in the Yugoslav monarchy of the Karađorđević dynasty. After the destruction of the Yugoslav monarchy by Axis forces in 1941, and the liberation of the country by Yugoslav Partisans in 1945, he became a minister in Democratic Federal Yugoslavia and later the deputy prime minister of the newly established Federal People's Republic of Yugoslavia. He held this post until his death in 1948.

== Early life and education ==
Jaša Prodanović attended high schools in Čačak and Belgrade. He subsequently studied at the School of Mathematics and Natural Sciences at Velika škola in Belgrade until 1890. While a student, he established ties with foreign Socialist youth movements. He was one of the editors of the collected writings of Svetozar Marković, his idol. He also edited the youth periodicals Srpska Misao and Narodna Misao.

== Career ==
In 1890, Prodanović became a high school teacher and took up journalism and literary criticism. In 1901 he joined the Independent Radical Party, a faction of the Radical Party. From 1902 to 1912 he edited the party's periodical, Odjek on an irregular basis. In 1903 he became a Member of Parliament. From 1909 to 1911 he served as minister of the economy in the government of Stojan Novaković and was instrumental in the adoption of a 1911 law on workers' insurance. In the 1920s he sharply criticized the way the parliamentary system functioned. He openly opposed the authoritarian style of King Alexander and criticized the constitution promulgated by the king on 3 September 1931. When World War II ended, he attended the Potsdam Conference as Minister for Serbia in the Provisional Government of Yugoslavia before he joined the communists to become the first deputy prime minister of the Federal People's Republic of Yugoslavia.

== Works ==
He is best remembered as a writer. Prodanović edited anthologies of works by Jovan Ilić (1929), Svetislav Vulović (1932) and Jovan Jovanović Zmaj (1933-1937) as well as the collection Antologija narodne poezije (Anthology of National Poetry).

His selected works include:

- Ustavni razvitak i ustavne borbe u Srbiji (Constitutional developments and the struggle for a constitution in Serbia, 1936);
- Istorija politickih stranaka i struja u Serbiji (The history of political parties and influences in Serbia, 1947).
