= Vasa Jovanović =

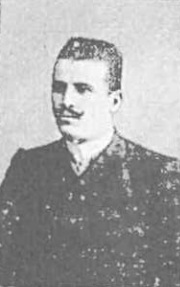
Vasa Jovanović

Vasilije Jovanović (Serbian Cyrillic: Василије Јовановић; February 1874 – 31 December 1970), also known as Vasa Makedonac ("Vasa the Macedonian;" Serbian Cyrillic: Васа Македонац), was a Serbian lawyer, politician, founder of the Chetnik movement and a founding member of the League of Nations.

== Early years and education ==
Faced with ethnic Albanian violence, Jovanović's family fled the village of Kožlje. They found refuge in Skopje, Macedonia, where Vasilije was born. After his primary education, the family moved to Belgrade where young Jovanović finished high school and Law Faculty. He rounded out his education with a PhD in Brussels.

== Founding of the Chetnik movement ==
As a lawyer in Belgrade he was a member of a masonic lodge Pobratimstvo where he was acquainted with Luka Ćelović and Milorad Gođevac who already kept touch with Serbs in Macedonia, especially those acting within VMRO. In September 1903 the group formed a Serb revolutionary and guerrilla committee for Macedonia – Glavni odbor četničke akcije. Jovanović became its secretary and one of its leaders until 1905.

After the Young Turk revolution in 1908 when affairs in Macedonia seemed to be going towards a political solution, Jovanović took part in the First Conference of Serbs of Old Serbia and Macedonia (12-15 August 1908) in Skopje. He was elected as a member of the Central Committee of the newly founded Serb Democratic League (political party of Serbs living in the Ottoman Empire). Jovanović also took part as a member of the Assembly of Serbs in Ottoman Empire in Skopje, which first met in February 1909 and was active until the end of that year when it was banned by the Young Turks.

== WWI and later political career ==
In World War I he was mobilized and later on was sent to France by Serbian government.

After the War he was in Geneva as a Yugoslav member of the League of Nations. In Kingdom of Yugoslavia he took active role in politics and acted as a Minister of Transport in several governments.

== See also ==
- List of Chetnik voivodes
