= Babuna (mountain) =

Mountain in North Macedonia

Coordinates: 41.3833°N 21.6833°E

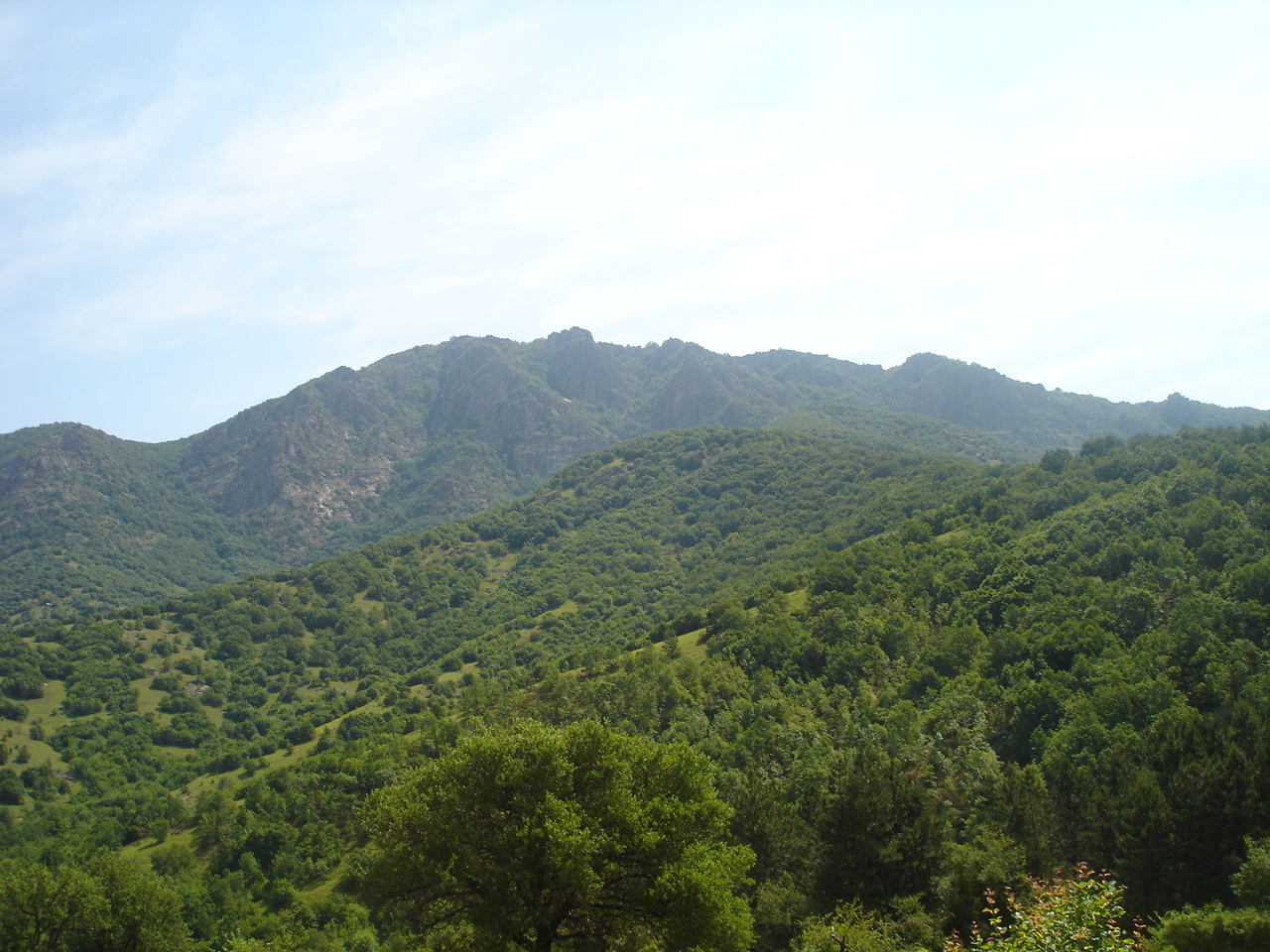
Babuna mountain, Macedonia

Babuna is a mountain in central North Macedonia, located within the Veles Municipality. It is situated by the Vardar river.
