= Golub Janić =

Serbian millionaire and politician

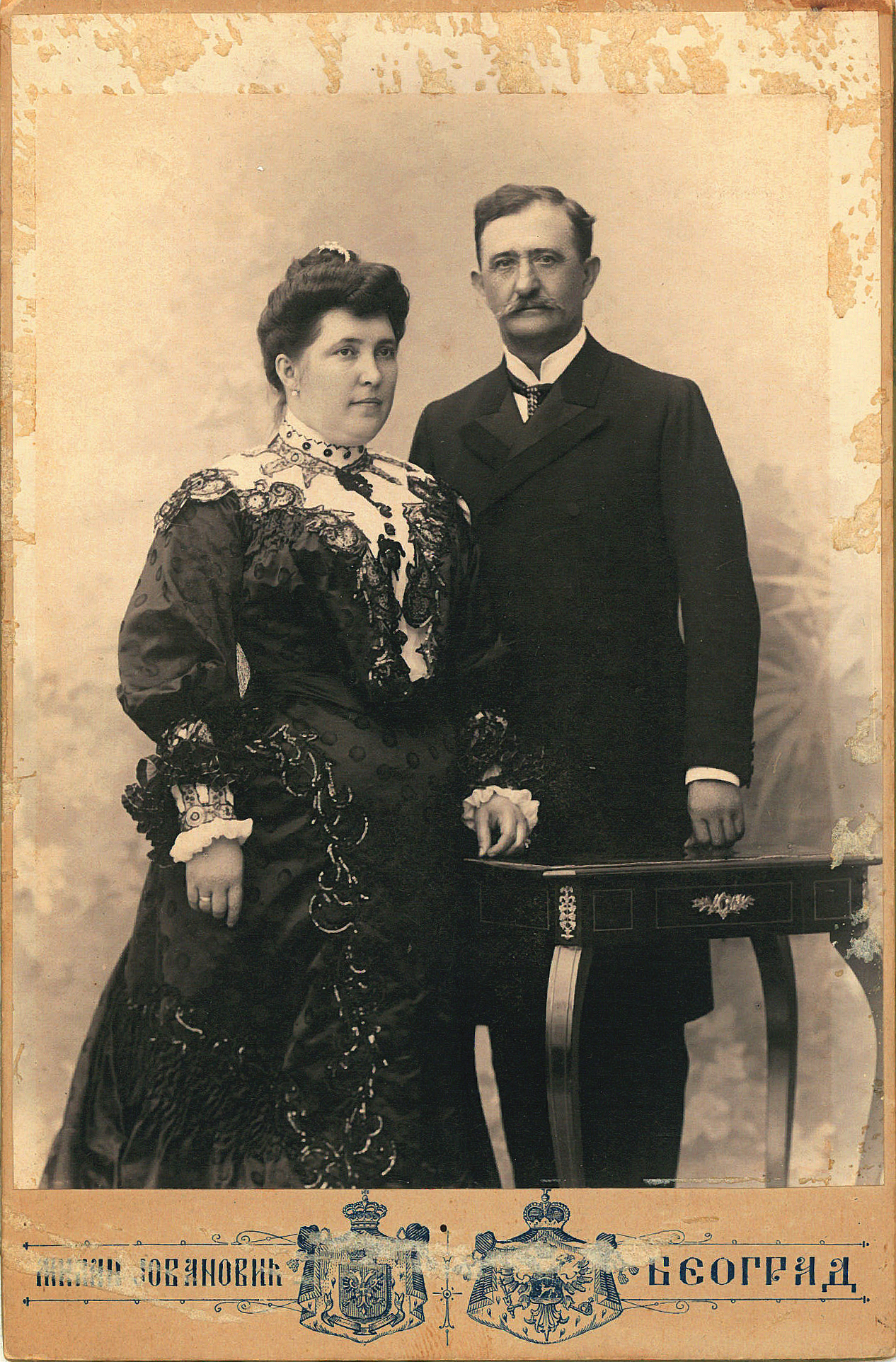
Golub Janić and wife Bosiljka.

Golub S. Janić (Mavrovo 1853 – Belgrade 1918) was a Serbian millionaire, MP, benefactor, and the most influential personality among the Macedonian Serbs living in Serbia at the beginning of the 20th century.

== Life ==
Janić was born in 1853 in Mavrovo to father Samuilo and mother Sofija (née Pejić).

His grandfather Jane had previously gone to Belgrade and started trading. His father Samuilo (1830–1889) was also a tradesman in the Serbian capital.

Golub Janić finished primary school and high school in Belgrade. He volunteered and took part in Serbo–Turkish War of 1876–78. After finishing his schooling, he was gradually introduced to his father's business. Samuilo Janić was a respected merchant and a rentier who owned many houses and parcels in Belgrade, most important of which was (the old) Hotel Balkan in Terazije.

Janić married Bosiljka (née Cincar-Janković) from notable Belgrade family, descended from vojvode hospodar Janko Popović, called Cincar Janko.

== National work ==
After his father's death in 1889, Golub Janić becomes dedicated to politics, above all on financing and coordinating the work for the liberation of Macedonia. He was a founder of a member of all the societies that organized guerrilla Chetnik actions as well as educational and benefactory work in Kosovo and Macedonia.

Janić was connected with top state officials. Later he was close to Nikola Pašić, who consulted him on all matters concerning Macedonia. Also, all of the buildings and estates that the Serbian government purchased in Kosovo and Macedonia for new schools were registered on Janić's name.

Janić was one of the founders of the Serbian Committee which from September 1903 coordinated the transfer of Chetnik units across the border into the Ottoman Empire; that is – to Macedonia. In 1905 he founded the society called Srpska braća ("Serbian Brothers") who took over the work of the Committee. The seat of the society was in Janić's house in Terazije. The same society also took part in humanitarian actions, such as gathering help from Serbs in USA to the flood-stricken areas of Serbia in 1910. Srpska braća seized to operate after World War One.

In 1915 he retreated with the Serbian army to Novi Pazar but then returned to Belgrade where he spent the entire Austro-Hungarian occupation. He died in 1918 just before the Serbian army entered the city.

== Endowment funds ==
Bosiljka Janić founded several endowment funds. The first one was in money given to the newly established Faculty of Philosophy and to Teachers' School in Skopje to reward the best essays on history and ethnography of Macedonia once per year. The second fund was in money and buildings with the purpose of building each year a new school in Macedonia, with a home for teachers in Southern Serbia and today's Macedonia. The third fund was dedicated to helping poor primary-school children.
