= Ljubomir Kovačević =

Serbian writer, historian, academic, and politician

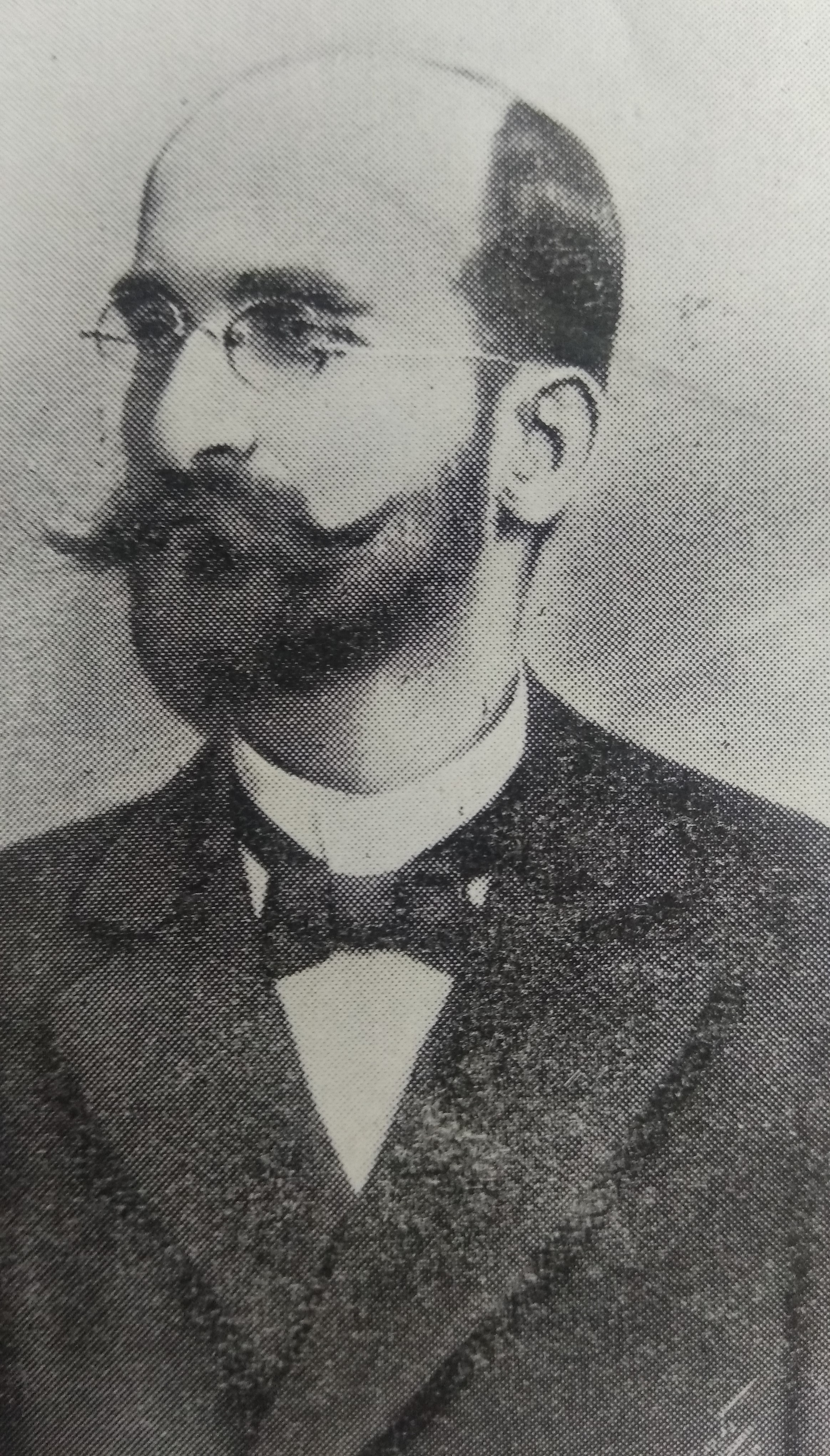
Ljubomir Kovacevic was a Serbian historian and politician

Ljubomir Kovačević (4 January 1848 – 19 November 1918) was a Serbian writer, historian, academic, and politician. He is one of the early creators of the Serbian critical historiographical school and fighters for the separation of historical science from tradition. Kovačević directly influenced the political and cultural activity of Serbia at the end of the nineteenth century. He and Ljubomir Jovanović were the authors of the well-known two-volume "Istorija srpskog naroda za srednje škole" (History of the Serbian People for the Secondary Schools) in the Kingdom of Serbia. Both Kovačević and Jovanović were Ministers of Education at one time and, as historians, using a wealth of verified information, professionally and convincingly refuted many myths that were passed down through the ages.

== Biography ==
Kovačević was born in the village of Petnica in the Principality of Serbia on 4 January 1848. His father was Mihailo Kovačević, the Serbian Orthodox parish priest of Petnica, and his mother Vasilija was the daughter of professor Janićije Popović. Kovačević was educated at the Gymnasium of Šabac and the Belgrade Velika škola; he took his degree in 1870, afterward was employed as lecturer at a college in Negotin and a year later he joined the staff of a teacher's college in Kragujevac before it was relocated to Belgrade. Later, he became a professor of history at his alma mater and rector of the University of Belgrade (former Velika škola). Kovačević chose to specialize in history because of his desire to be involved in the developing field of critical historiography.

Kovačević had five daughters and a son, Vladeta Kovačević (1882–1912), a former student of the University of Paris. At the Battle of Kumanovo, where he commanded the Mitrailleuses (machineguns), Vladeta was killed. His body was brought back to Belgrade. On the day of the funeral, his mother and five sisters wept and groaned aloud. At the grave the old father without a tear made a moving speech:

My son, depart in peace. You have done your duty. My son, I do not weep: I am proud of you. You have joined the heroes whose sufferings and death of old saved by millions the lives and souls of our nation. Tell the heroes of Kosovo, Dušan and Lazar and all the martyrs of former days, that today Kosovo is avenged.

Kovačević fought in the Serbian–Ottoman War (1876–78). He died at Vrnjačka Banja on 19 November 1918.

== Selected works ==
- Nekoliko hronoloških ispravki u srpskoj istoriji, 1879.
- Znamenite vlasteotske porodice srednjeg veka, 1888.
- Despot Stefan Lazarević za vreme turskih međusobica (1402 — 1413), 1880.
- Najstariji bugarski novci, 1908.
- Dva nepoznata bosanska novca, 1910.
- I opet kralj Vukašin nije ubio cara Uroša, 1884.
- I po treći put kralj Vukašin nije ubio kralja Uroša, 1886.
- Vuk Branković, 1888.
- Srbi u Hrvatskoj i veleizdajnička parnica, 1909.
- Nekoliko pitanja o Stefanu Nemanji, 1891.
- Žene i deca Stefana Prvovenčanog, 1901.
- Istorija Srpskoga Naroda, 1893.

== See also ==
- List of Chetnik voivodes

Government offices
Preceded by Ljubomir Klerić	Minister of Education of Serbia; 1895–1896	Succeeded by Aron Ninčić
Preceded by Pavle Marinković	Minister of Education of Serbia; 1901–1902	Succeeded by Dragutin Stamenković
