= List of Serbian soldiers =

This is a list of Serbian soldiers since the establishment of the Principality of Serbia. It only includes participants in wars.

== Balkan Wars ==
- David Albala
- Ditko Aleksić
- Miša Aleksić-Marinko
- Jovan Atanacković
- Jovan Babunski
- Petar Bojović
- Vukajlo Božović
- Koporan Čauš
- Ljuba Čupa
- Dušan Dimitrijević
- Jovan Dovezenski
- Dragutin Jovanović-Lune
- Svetomir Đukić
- Spasa Garda
- Jovan Grković-Gapon
- Živko Gvozdić
- Petko Ilić
- Bogoljub Jevtić
- Ljuba Jezdić
- Danilo Kalafatović
- Tasa Konević
- Stojan Koruba
- Radoje Ljutovac
- Kosta Vojinović
- Krsta Kovačević
- Stanislav Krakov
- Todor Krstić-Algunjski
- Dimitrije Ljotić
- Branislav Milosavljević
- Aleksandar Mišić
- Živojin Mišić
- Jovan Naumović
- Milutin Nedić
- Stevan Nedić-Ćela
- Borko Paštrović
- Kosta Pećanac
- Vojin Popović
- Zafir Premčević
- Radomir Putnik
- Darko F. Ribnikar
- Borisav Ristić
- Sava Petrović-Grmija
- Slobodan Šiljak
- Stepa Stepanović
- Dane Stojanović
- Vojislav Tankosić
- Toma Smiljanić-Bradina
- Živko Topalović
- Vasilije Trbić
- Dragiša Vasić
- Stanislav Vinaver
- Janko Vukotić

== World War I ==
- David Albala (1886–1942), captain
- Miša Aleksić-Marinko (1876–1923), lieutenant colonel
- Jovan Atanacković (1848–1921), reserve general
- Jovan Babunski (1878–1920), Chetnik commander
- Theodore Bogdanovitch (1899–1956), volunteer
- Petar Bojović (1858–1945), general
- Boško Virjanac †(fl. 1903–15), Chetnik
- Vukajlo Božović (d. 1926), Chetnik commander
- Koporan Čauš (fl. 1904–14), volunteer
- Cene Marković (1864–1922), Chetnik
- Dušan Dimitrijević (1882–1964), Chetnik
- Jovan Dovezenski
- Dragutin Jovanović-Lune
- Momčilo Gavrić, child soldier
- Dragutin Gavrilović, major
- Bogoljub Ilić (1881–1956), detachment staff leader
- Dragoljub Jeličić, child soldier
- Bogoljub Jevtić
- Ljuba Jezdić
- Sofija Jovanović (1895–1979), soldier
- Pavle Jurišić Šturm
- Josif Mihajlović Jurukovski
- Danilo Kalafatović
- Sćepan Kecojević
- Simo Kecojević
- Ignjat Kirhner (1877–1944), volunteer, detachment commander
- Tasa Konević
- Stojan Koruba
- Krsta Kovačević
- Stanislav Krakov
- Bogoljub Kujundžić
- Radoje Ljutovac
- Dimitrije Ljotić
- Draža Mihailović
- Branislav Milosavljević
- Milan Milovanović (general)
- Milutin Bojić
- Milutin Krunich
- Aleksandar Mišić
- Živojin Mišić
- Fehim Musakadić
- Jovan Naumović
- Milan Nedić
- Milutin Nedić
- Stevan Nedić-Ćela
- Kosta Pećanac
- Zafir Premčević
- Adam Pribićević
- Radomir Putnik
- Aleksa Radovanović
- Archibald Reiss (1875–1929), soldier (foreigner)
- Darko F. Ribnikar
- Borisav Ristić
- Sava Petrović-Grmija
- Flora Sandes (1876–1956), sergeant major (foreigner)
- Milunka Savić
- Stevan Simić
- Ruth Stanley Farnam (1873–1946), volunteer (foreigner)
- Stepa Stepanović
- Dragiša Stojadinović
- Vojislav Tankosić
- Slavka Tomić (ca. 1896–?), sergeant
- Živko Topalović
- Vasilije Trbić
- Dimitrije Tucović
- Dragiša Vasić
- Miloš Vasić (general)
- Rudolf Viest (1890–1945), soldier (foreigner)
- Kosta Vojinović
- Janko Vukotić
- Živko Gvozdić
- Sreten Žujović

== World War II ==
Nikola Stanimirović JNA Lt. Colonel (Commander - General) Novi Sad Yugoslavia

== Yugoslav wars ==
The Yugoslav Wars (1991–1999) were a series of conflicts following the dissolution of Yugoslavia. Serbian soldiers played pivotal roles in these wars, serving in the Yugoslav People's Army (JNA), local Serbian forces, and various paramilitary units. This article provides a list of notable Serbian soldiers, their roles, and their historical impact.

Notable Serbian Soldiers

1. Slobodan Milošević

Role: President of Serbia and Supreme Commander of the Yugoslav Armed Forces during the wars.

Contributions: Strategized military efforts in Croatia, Bosnia, and Kosovo. Later faced charges at the International Criminal Tribunal for the Former Yugoslavia (ICTY).

2. Ratko Mladić

Role: Commander of the Army of Republika Srpska (Bosnian Serb forces).

Known for: Leadership during the Bosnian War, particularly in the Srebrenica genocide, for which he was convicted of war crimes.

3. Radovan Karadžić

Role: Political leader of the Bosnian Serbs and President of Republika Srpska.

Involvement: Coordinated military actions alongside Ratko Mladić.

4. Željko Ražnatović (Arkan)

Role: Leader of the "Arkan's Tigers," a Serbian paramilitary unit.

Involvement: Led operations in Croatia and Bosnia, accused of human rights violations.

5. Nebojša Pavković

Role: Commander of the Third Army of the Yugoslav Army.

Known for: Leading operations during the Kosovo War.

6. Veselin Šljivančanin

Role: JNA officer responsible for actions during the Siege of Vukovar.

Involvement: Convicted for war crimes related to the Ovčara massacre.

7. Franko Simatović

Role: Co-founder of the Special Operations Unit (JSO).

Involvement: Led covert operations during the wars.

8. Milorad Ulemek (Legija)

Role: Commander of the JSO.

Known for: Participation in military operations and later involvement in Serbian political assassinations.

---

Role of Serbian Forces

Serbian military personnel and paramilitary units were involved in significant battles, including the Siege of Vukovar, the Siege of Sarajevo, and operations in Kosovo. These forces were supported by the Yugoslav People's Army and local militias.

---

Legal Proceedings and Controversies

Many Serbian soldiers and commanders were tried at the ICTY for their roles in war crimes and crimes against humanity. Key cases include those of Ratko Mladić, Radovan Karadžić, and Slobodan Milošević.

== See also ==
- List of Serbian Revolutionaries (1804–15)
- Yugoslav volunteers in the Spanish Civil War

== Sources ==
- Milićević, Milić; Popović, Ljubodrag (2003). Generali vojske Kneževine i Kraljevine Srbije. Vojnoizdavački zavod.
- Nikolić, Dejan (2000). Srpske vojskovođe. Narodna biblioteka "Resavska škola".
