= Spomenko Gostić =

Bosnian Serb soldier

- Born: 14 August 1978; Doboj, SR Bosnia and Herzegovina, SFR Yugoslavia
- Died: 20 March 1993 (aged 14); Jovići, Bosnia and Herzegovina
- Burial place: Gornji Ulišnjak, Bosnia and Herzegovina
- Military career
- Allegiance: Republika Srpska
- Service years: 1992–1993
- Rank: Soldier
- Conflicts: Bosnian War

Spomenko Gostić (Serbian Cyrillic: Споменко Гостић; 14 August 1978 – 20 March 1993) was a Bosnian Serb soldier during the Bosnian War. He was the youngest decorated soldier in the Army of Republika Srpska.

== Life ==
Gostić was born on 14 August 1978 in Doboj, SR Bosnia and Herzegovina, SFR Yugoslavia. He attended elementary school in Maglaj but due to the outbreak of war in Bosnia, he did not graduate. At a very young age he was left without his father.

In 1992 (the first year of the war), he lived with his mother Milena in the village of Jovići near Maglaj. The village was surrounded with smaller towns with a majority Bosniak population. Gostić thus found himself on the front-lines. In April 1992, his mother died so he went to live with his grandmother. His grandmother was killed in September 1992 during the bombing of the village by the Army of the BiH forces.

=== As a soldier ===
Shortly after this, Gostić joined the Army of Republika Srpska, where he started off as a military courier. After this he was transferred to the duty of delivering food to soldiers on the front-lines. While going about his duties upon horse, he fell into a mine field. The horses succumbed to the mines but Gostić was not seriously wounded. He would later go on to be wounded again.

In the ARBiH offensive on mount Ozren, the local population retreated from Jovići but Gostić remained with a few soldiers to defend the village.

In March 1993, during the bombing of the checkpoints of the Serb army, five soldiers were killed and Gostić was seriously wounded. Gostić died of his injuries on 20 March 1993 in Jovići on mount Ozren at the age of 14. He was buried along with his fallen peers in the cemetery in Gornji Ulišnjak.

=== After the war ===
After the war, Jovići was integrated into the Federation of Bosnia and Herzegovina, while the village Donja Bočinja near Jovići became the religious and political center for the local Wahhabi movement. Pantelija Ćurguz, president of the Association of Veterans of Republika Srpska, said in a news report that he promised to begin an initiative for the remains of Gostić to be moved to Republika Srpska.

=== Awards and legacy ===
Gostić was posthumously awarded Republika Srpska's Medal of Merit for the People (Serbian: Медаља заслуге за народ / Medalja zasluge za narod). In some cities in Republika Srpska, petitions have been initiated for streets to be named after Gostić.

== See also ==
- Momčilo Gavrić (1906–1993), Serbian child soldier from World War I
- Dragoljub Jeličić (1902–1963), Serbian child soldier from World War I
