= Krupp 7.5 cm Model 1903 =

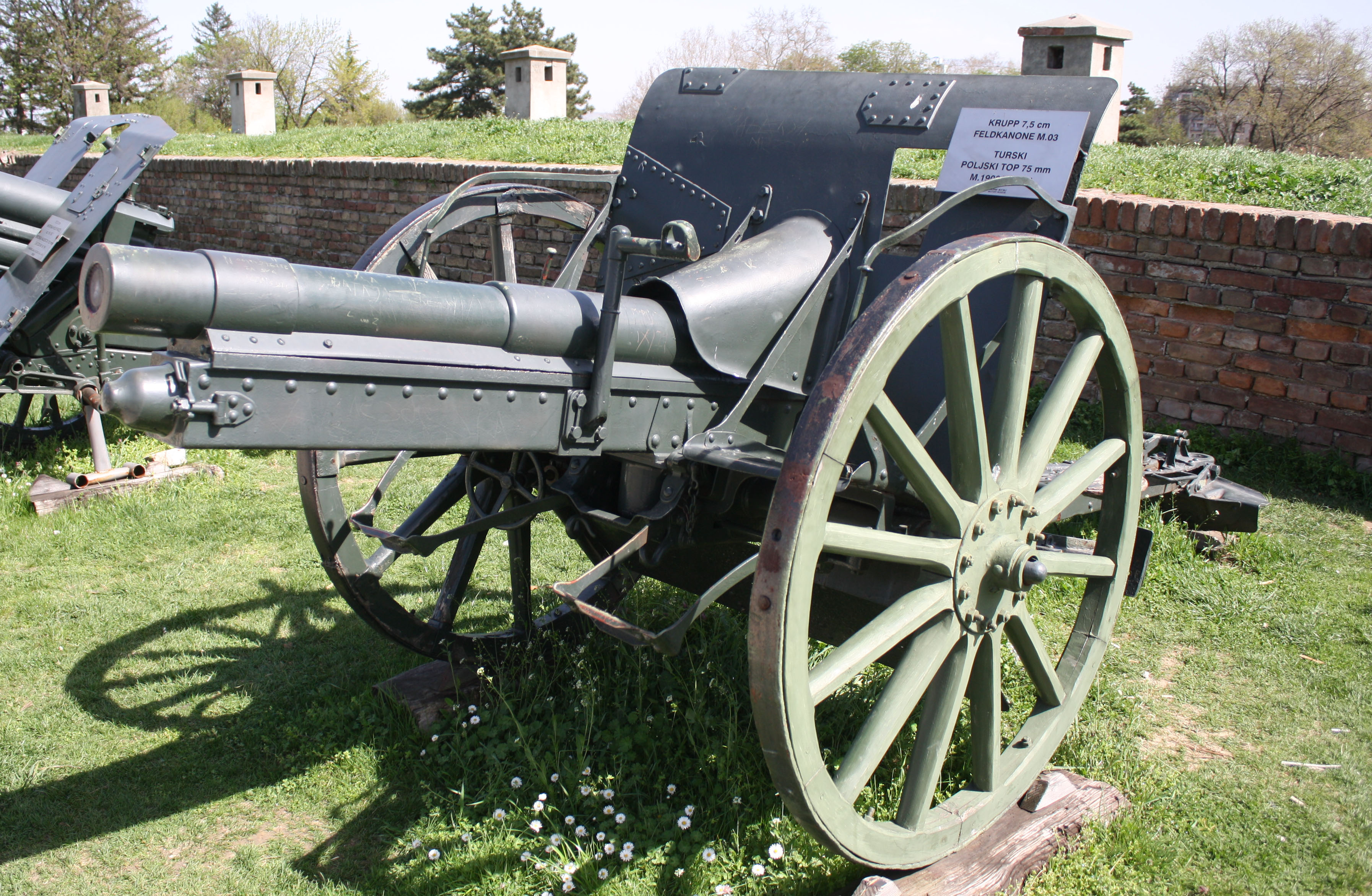
- A Turkish 7.5cm Krupp field gun M1903
- Type: Field gun
- Place of origin: German Empire

Service history
- In service: 1904–1948
- Used by: See § Users
- Wars: Balkan Wars; Xinhai Revolution; World War I; World War II; 1948 Palestine war

Production history
- Designer: Krupp
- Manufacturer: Krupp

Specifications
- Mass: 1,079 kg (2,379 lb)
- Barrel length: 2.25 m (7 ft 5 in) L/30
- Crew: 7
- Shell: Fixed QF 75×280mmR
- Shell weight: 6.52 kg (14.4 lb)
- Caliber: 75 mm (2.95 in)
- Breech: Horizontal sliding-block
- Recoil: Hydro-spring
- Carriage: Pole trail
- Elevation: -9° / +15°
- Traverse: 7°
- Rate of fire: 8 rpm
- Muzzle velocity: 546 m/s (1,790 ft/s)
- Maximum firing range: 6,000 m (6,600 yd)

The Krupp 7.5 cm Model 1903 was a field gun used by a number of European armies in both World War I and World War II.

== History ==
The Model 1903 was manufactured for export by Krupp. It was a "stock gun", meaning that it could be supplied to customers on short notice with minor alterations to suit the customers needs.

The German army of World War I did not use the Krupp 7.5 cm Model 1903. It had acquired the rather conventional 7.7 cm FK 96 as its standard gun in 1896. When the French army acquired the Canon de 75 modèle 1897 with hydraulic recoil mechanism in 1897, the FK 96 became obsolete. The model was then changed to become the 7.7 cm FK 96 n.A., which retained the barrel, but put it on a recoil mechanism and new carriage.

== Operational service ==
=== Belgium ===
The Belgians bought a license to produce the M1903 at the Fonderie Royal des Cannons and were given the designation Canon de 7c5 M 1905 TR et TRA. They were used by Belgium during the First World War and Second World War. The Germans gave captured Belgian guns the designation 7.5 cm Feldkanone 235(b). It was also used by Belgian's King Leopold II's forces in Congo.

=== Denmark ===
The Model 1903 was also bought by Denmark and used in World War II. In Danish service it was known as the 03 L/30 and does not appear to have been modified in any significant way before World War II. Danish guns were known in German service as the 7.5 cm Feldkanone 240(d).

=== Netherlands ===
The Dutch bought some 204 of the slightly earlier Kanone M.02/03 and purchased a production-license as well. 120 appear to have been manufactured in the Netherlands, where it was known as the Stuk van 7-veld. During the 1920s, the Dutch Siderius company, a Krupp subsidiary, rebuilt their guns to increase their elevation. At least 16 were modified for motorized traction, presumably with steel wheels and pneumatic tires, for service with the Light Division. Gander and Chamberlain claim there were three almost identical versions, the M 02/04, OM 04 and NM 10, but this has not been confirmed. The Germans designated these guns as the 7.5 cm Feldkanone 243(h) after the Battle of the Netherlands.

=== Israel ===
During the 1948 Palestine war, Israel purchased 50 surplus Krupp 7.5 cm Model 1903 guns from Romania. Six salvaged Sherman tanks were temporarily equipped with Krupp field guns until 105mm howitzers were obtained to replace them.

=== Japan ===
The Model 1903 also formed the basis for the Type 38 75 mm Field Gun used by Japan.

=== Romania ===
Romania acquired 636 guns and gave them the designation Tunul de câmp Krupp, cal. 75 mm, md. 1904. They used a more sophisticated sighting device (than the one offered by the Germans) made locally, known as the Ghenea-Korodi sight. By number of guns, this was largest import of a single type of cannon ever made by Romania. It was the mainstay of the Romanian field artillery in World War I, equipping all artillery regiments of the Romanian infantry divisions. The number of these guns in Romanian service had decreased to 312 by 1926. The Romanians used them until 1942, although by this time they had become obsolete.

=== Serbia ===
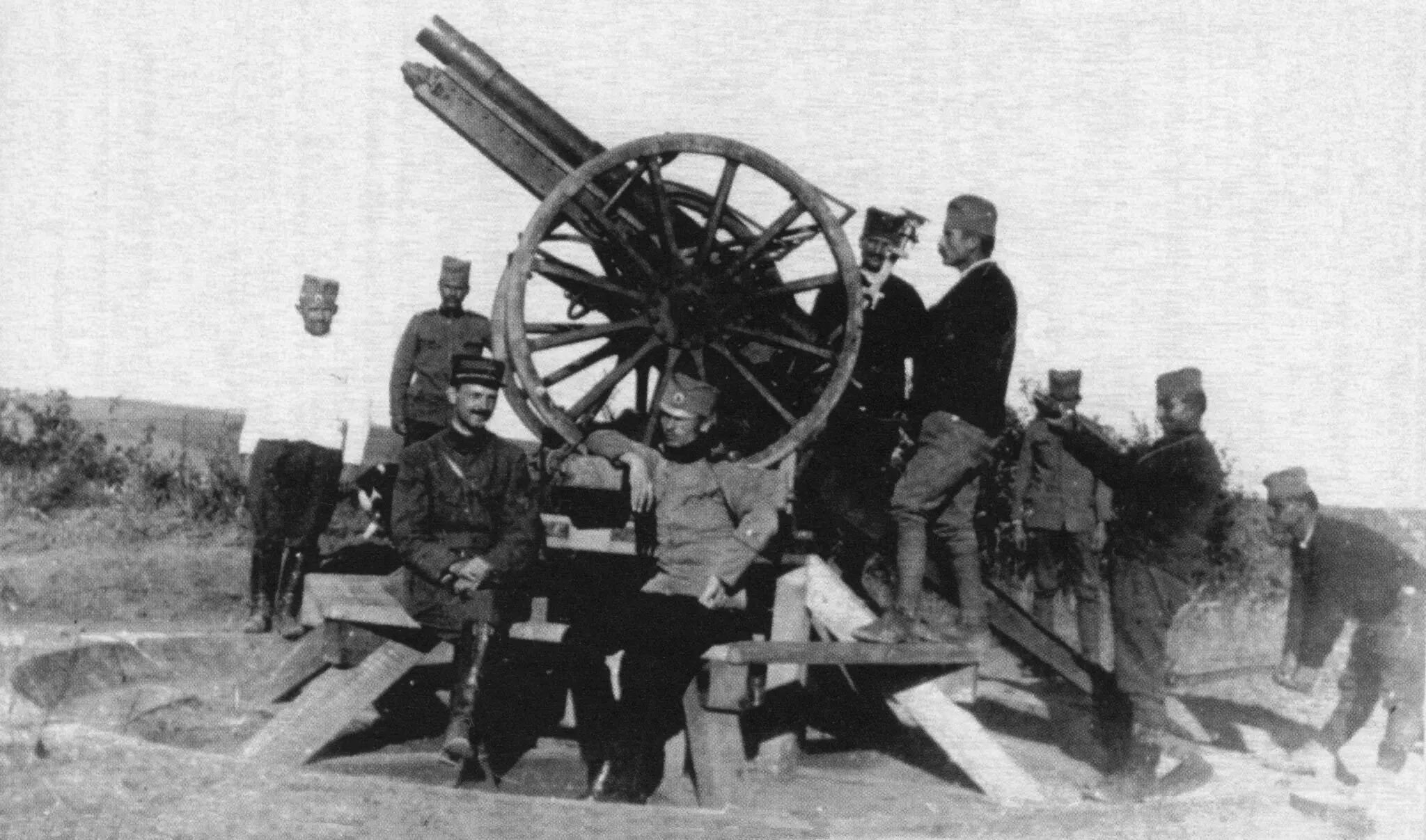
Serbian 75-mm Krupp gun in an AA mount defending Kragujevac during WWI

During the First Balkan War 126 field and 6 mountain Ottoman Krupp 7.5 cm Model 1903 guns were captured by the Royal Serbian Army. In the beginning of WWI the field guns were mounted on improvised wooden AA platforms designed by French captain Mortureux, and one of those achieved the first shootdown of an aircraft by ground fire in history.

== Users ==
- Belgium
- Brazil
- China
- Denmark
- Nazi Germany
- Israel
- Imperial Japan
- Korean Empire
- Netherlands
- Ottoman Empire
- Qing dynasty
- Romania
- Serbia
- Switzerland
- Thailand

== Bibliography ==
- Chamberlain, Peter & Gander, Terry. Light and Medium Field Artillery. New York: Arco, 1975
- Hogg, Ian Twentieth-Century Artillery. New York: Barnes & Nobles, 2000 ISBN 0-7607-1994-2
- Gander, Terry and Chamberlain, Peter. Weapons of the Third Reich: An Encyclopedic Survey of All Small Arms, Artillery and Special Weapons of the German Land Forces 1939-1945. New York: Doubleday, 1979 ISBN 0-385-15090-3
