= Commemorative Medal for Loyalty to the Fatherland in 1915 =

Single-classed Serbian military medal

Commemorative Medal for Loyalty to the Fatherland in 1915 Споменица за верност oтаџбини 1915.
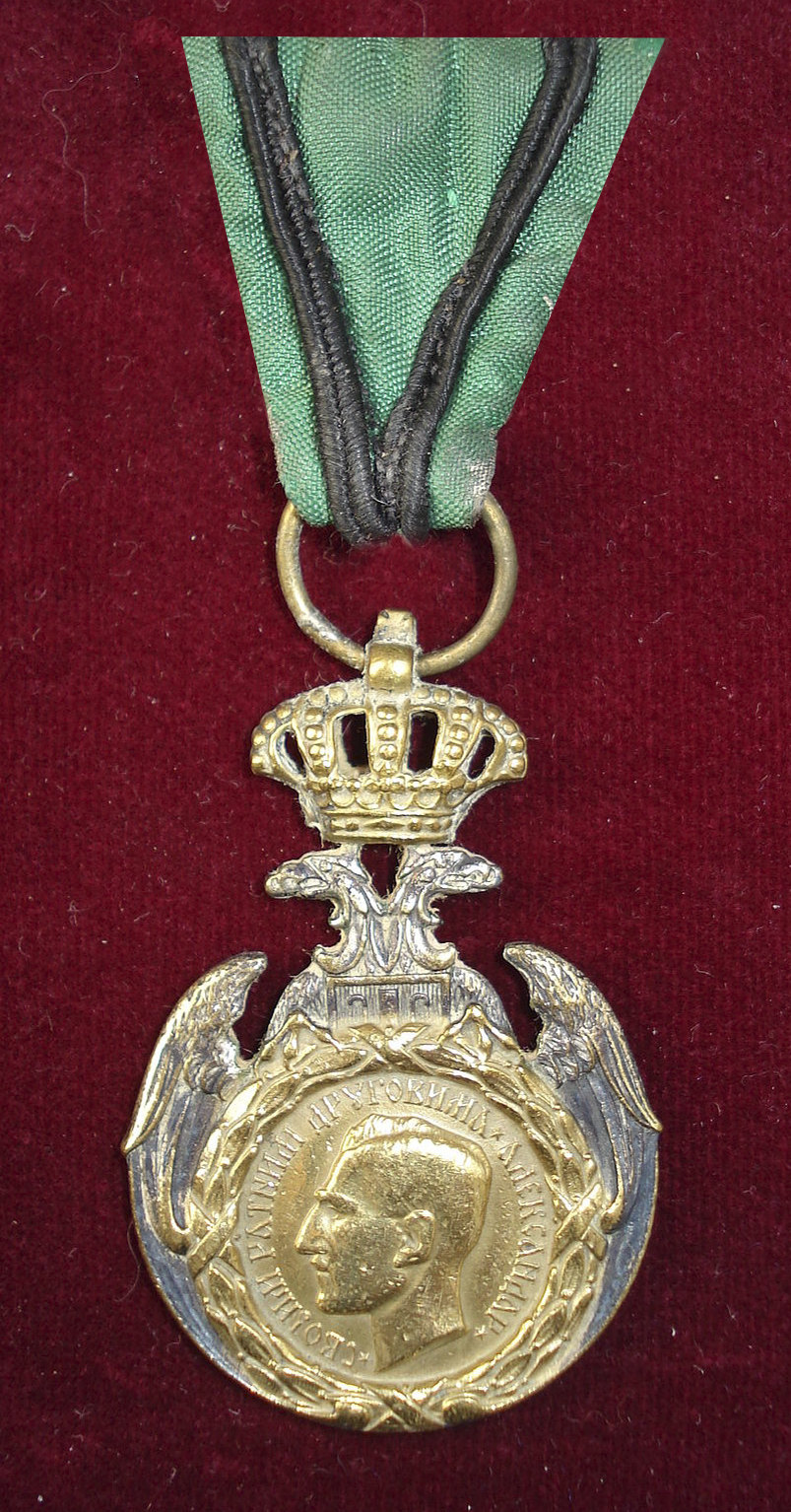
- Type: Military decoration
- Awarded for: Taking part in the Retreat through Albania of 1915
- Presented by: Kingdom of Yugoslavia
- Eligibility: Military personnel
- Status: Discontinued
- Established: 5 April 1920
- First award: 1920

Highlights
- Total: 142,148
- Commemorative Medal for Loyalty to the Fatherland in 1915 ribbon

Commemorative Medal for Loyalty to the Fatherland in 1915 (Serbian: Споменица за верност отаџбини 1915., romanized: Spomenica za vernost otadžbini 1915.), better known as the Albanian Commemorative Medal (Serbian: Албанска споменица, romanized: Albanska spomenica), was a single-classed military medal awarded to all Serbian military personnel who participated in the Great Retreat of World War I.

== History and criteria ==
The Commemorative Medal for Loyalty to the Fatherland in 1915 was instituted on 5 April 1920 by decree of Crown Prince-Regent Alexander I Karađorđević in the newly established Kingdom of Serbs, Croats and Slovenes until 1929, then by the Kingdom of Yugoslavia.

At the end of 1915, Serbia was invaded by combined Austro-Hungarian, German and Bulgarian armies, the greatly outnumbered Serbian Army, under the command of King Peter and Prince Alexander, faced total destruction but refused to come to terms. The decision was taken to retreat through the mountains of Albania towards the Adriatic coast to Corfu and Greece. During the journey across the mountains around 70,000 soldiers and 140,000 civilians froze, starved to death, died of disease or were killed by hostile Albanian tribes. The reorganised Serbian Army continued fighting the rest of the war on the Macedonian front liberating their country alongside French troops in 1918.

The Commemorative Medal was given on anniversaries and jubilees to all the participants of the event.

== Appearance ==
The medal was gilt and silvered bronze in appearance, 32.5 mm x 50 mm. the obverse side depicts the profile of the Supreme Commander of the Serbian Army, Prince-Regent Alexander I, surrounding it is the inscription TO MY COMRADES IN ARMS ALEKSANDAR (својим ратним друговима Александар). On the reverse is the inscription FOR LOYALTY TO THE FATHERLAND 1915 (за верност отаџбини 1915).

The medal is worn on a light green bar with black stripes along the edge.

The medal was struck by Arthus-Bertrand in Paris.

== Notable recipients ==
- Momčilo Gavrić
- Sergej Ingr
- Stanislav Krakov
- Milutin Nedić
- Milan Nedić
- Draža Mihailović
- Ilija Trifunović-Birčanin
- Milunka Savić
- Antonija Javornik

== Gallery ==
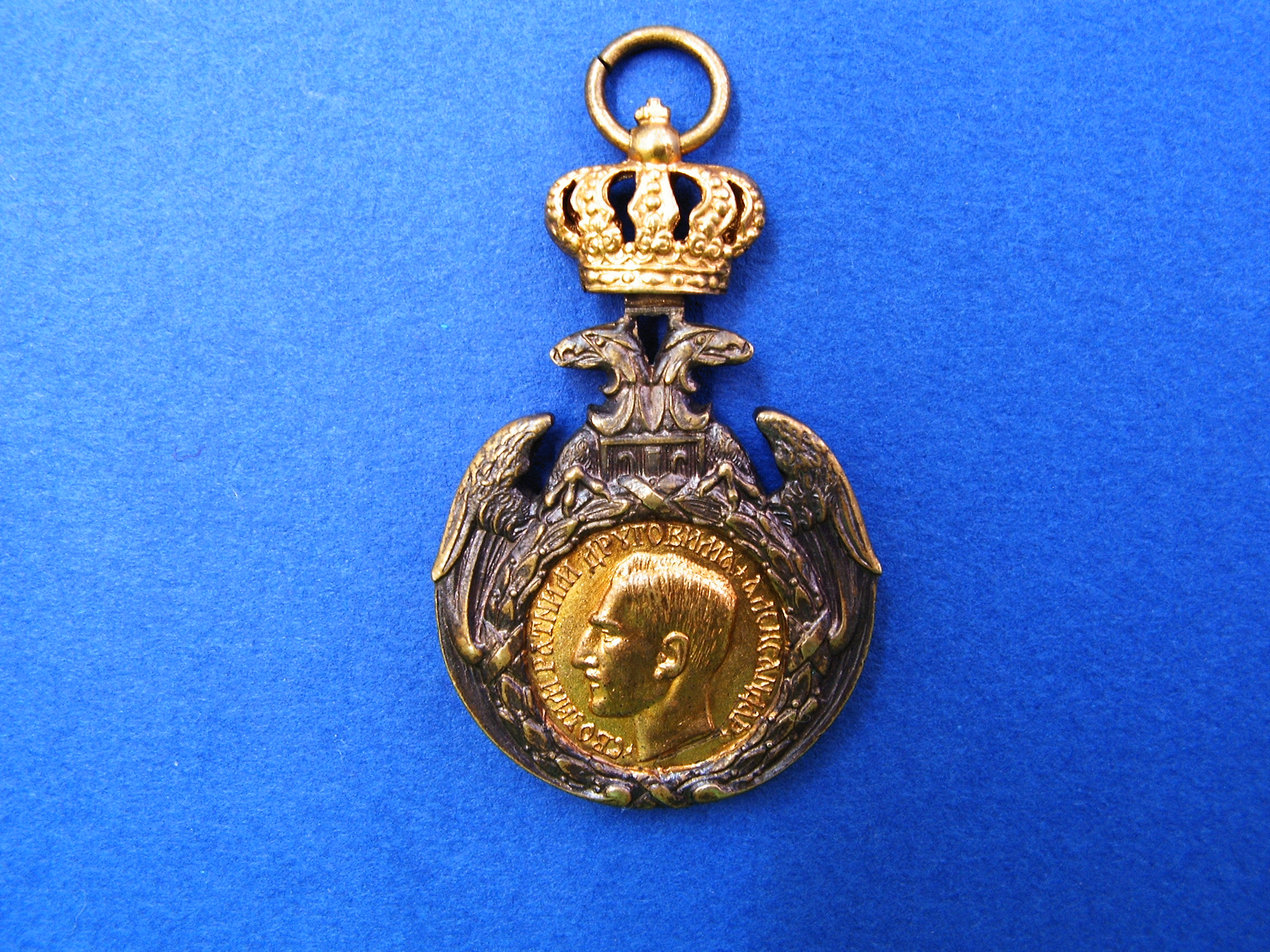
Front of the medal

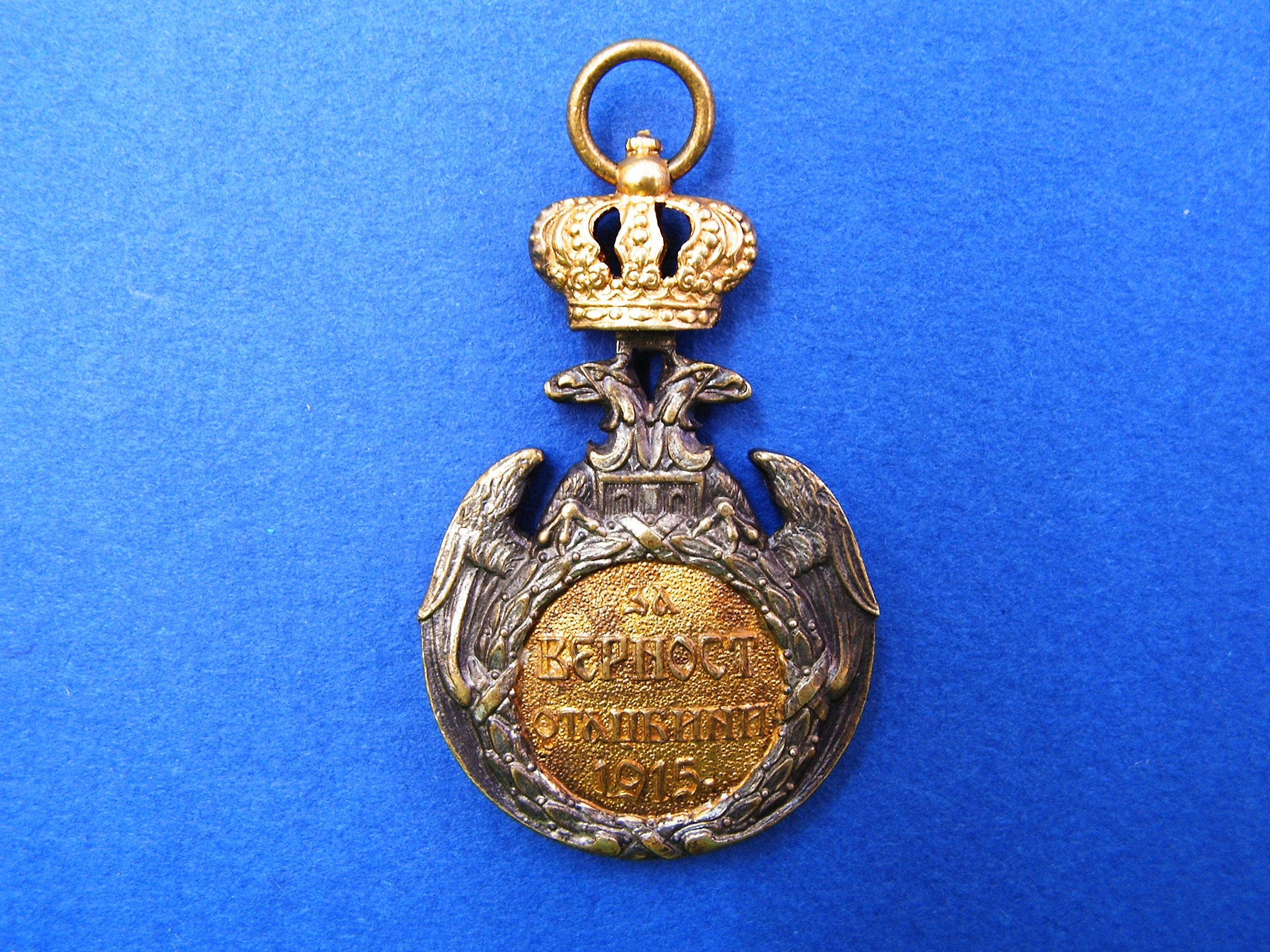
Reverse of the medal

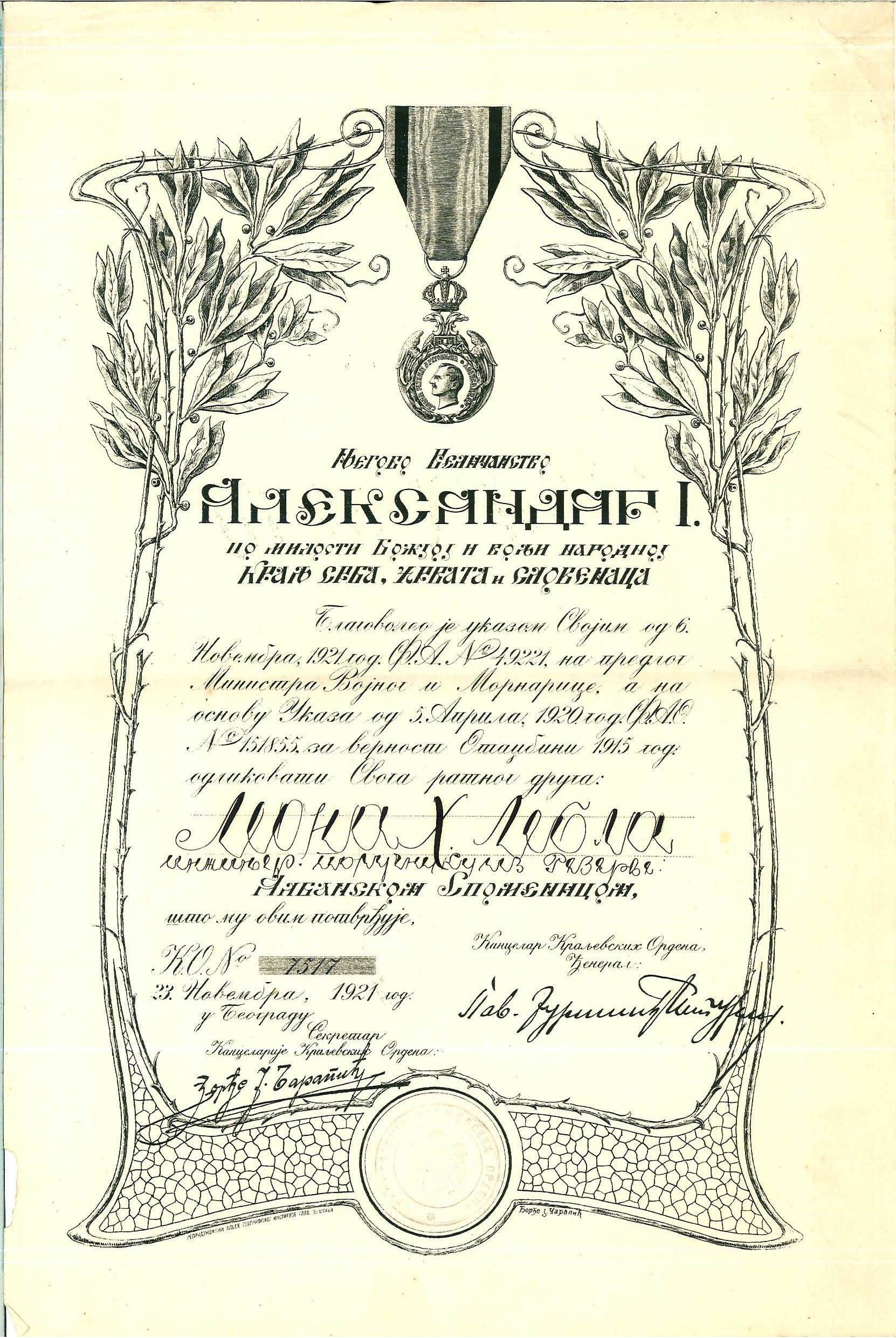
Document issued to Leon Lebl.

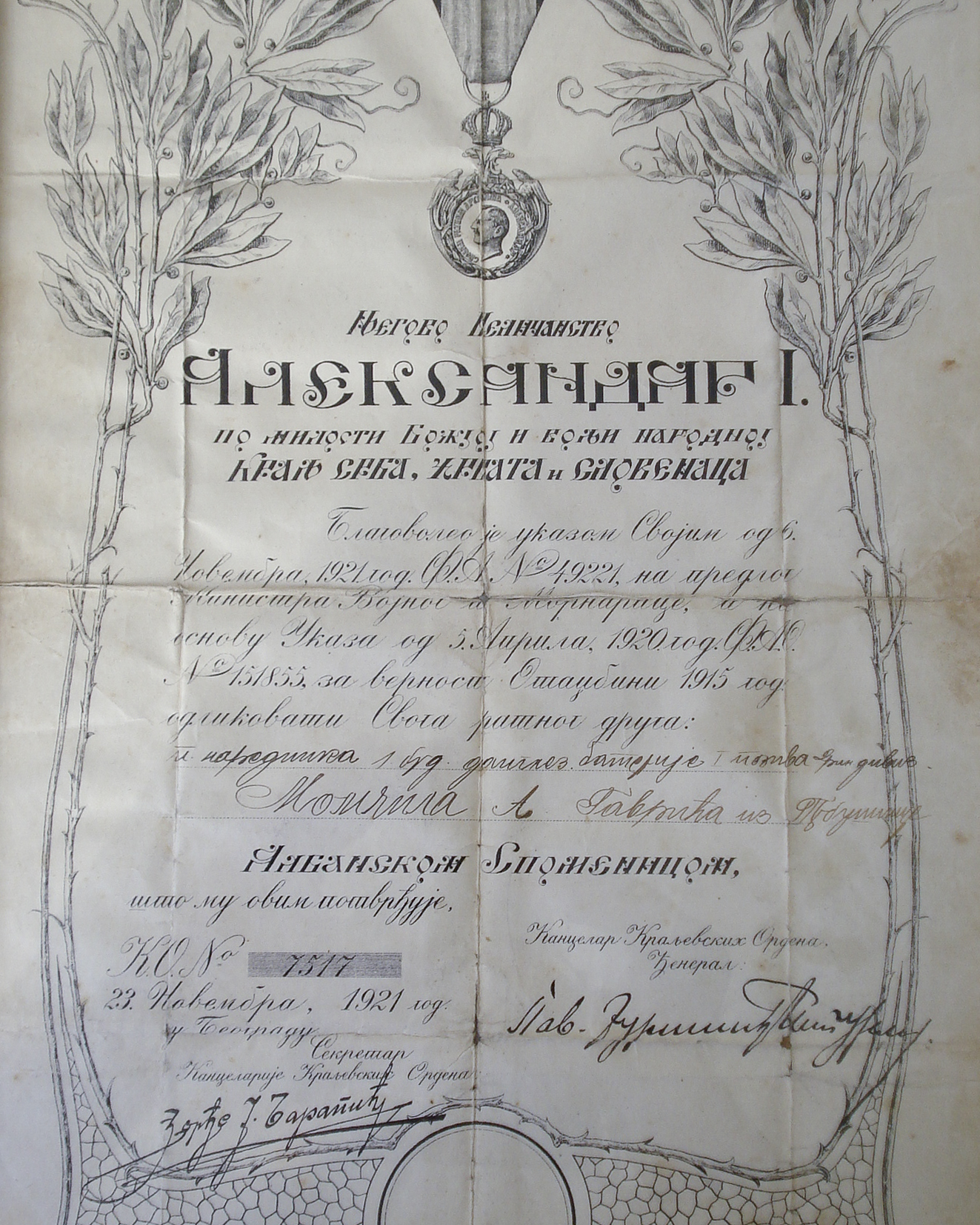
Document issued to Momčilo Gavrić.

== See also ==
- Great Retreat
