= 7 veld =

7 veld & Siderius M 02/04
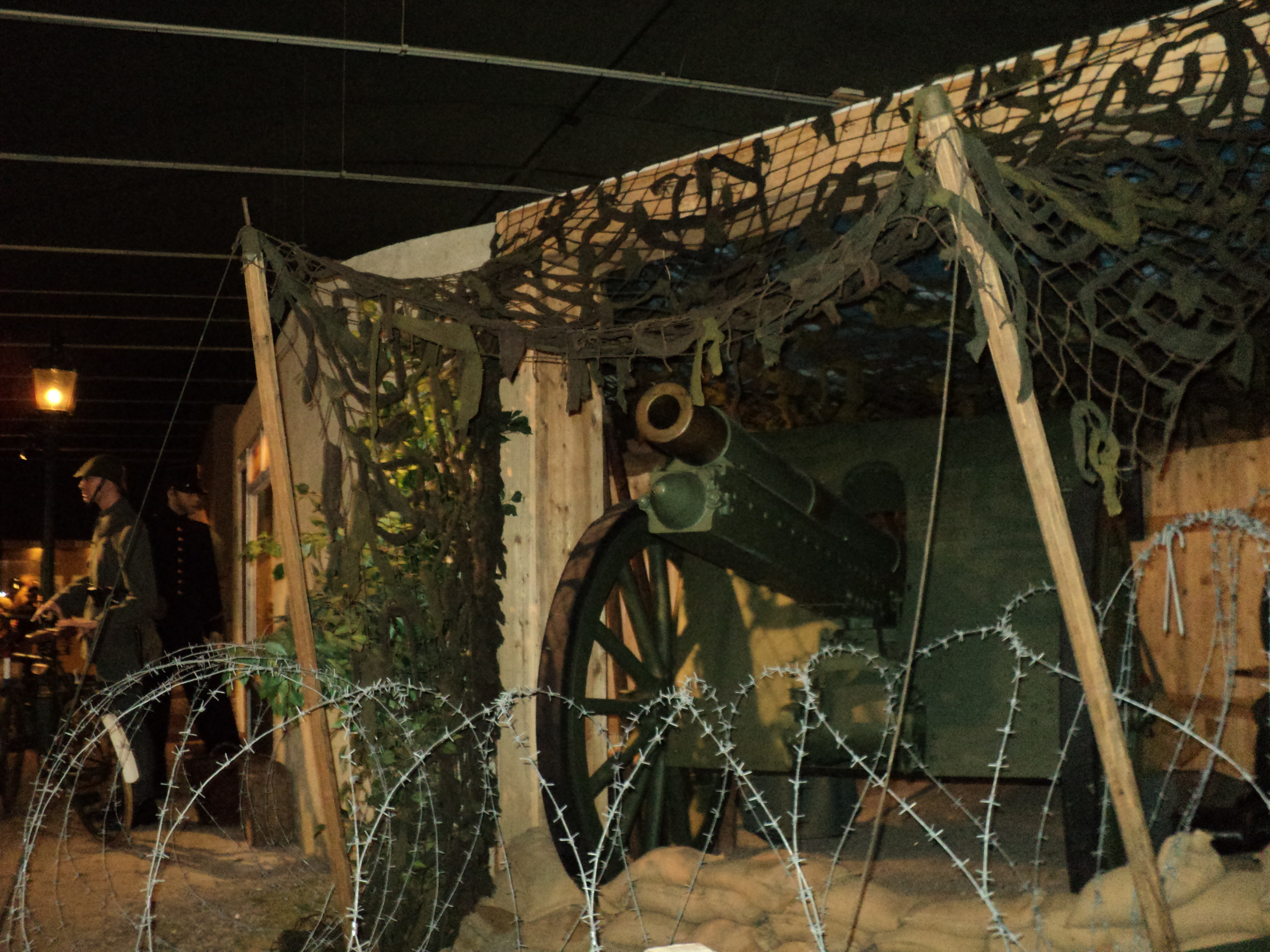
- Type: Field gun
- Place of origin: German Empire

Service history
- In service: 1925–1945
- Used by: Netherlands; Nazi Germany
- Wars: World War II

Production history
- Designer: Krupp
- Designed: 1903
- Manufacturer: Krupp
- No. built: 324?
- Variants: M 02/04, OM 04 and NM 10?

Specifications
- Mass: 1,299 kg (2,864 lb)
- Barrel length: 2.25 m (7.4 ft) L/30
- Crew: 7
- Shell: 6.5 kg (14 lb)
- Caliber: 75 mm (2.95 in)
- Breech: Horizontal sliding-wedge
- Recoil: Hydro-spring
- Carriage: Box trail
- Elevation: 7-veld: -9° to +15° M 02/04: -8° to +40°
- Traverse: 7-veld: 7° M 02/04: 9°
- Rate of fire: 8 rpm
- Muzzle velocity: 500 m/s (1,600 ft/s)
- Maximum firing range: 7-veld: 6 km (3.7 mi); M 02/04: 10.6 km (6.6 mi)

The Stuk van 7-veld was a later Dutch designation of the Krupp 7.5 cm Model 1903 field gun.

== Purchase ==
In 1905 the Dutch government purchased an early variant of the Krupp 7.5 cm Model 1903. The Dutch purchased 204 guns and 408 caissons from Krupp and produced another 120 guns under license. These saw service both in The Netherlands and the Dutch East Indies.

== Modernization ==
During the 1920s, the Dutch studied the lessons learned from the First World War which highlighted improvements needed to keep the 7 veld up to date in the years before the Second World War. The primary improvements needed were increased elevation and longer range. The prohibition on weapons production imposed by the Versailles Treaty lead German armament firms to open foreign subsidiaries to conduct business. One of these was Siderius, a Dutch subsidiary of Krupp, dedicated primarily to the modernization of Krupp artillery in service with the Dutch Army during the 1920s and 1930s. The most effective of its projects was the Siderius Model 02/04.

Gander and Chamberlain claim there were three almost identical versions, the M 02/04, OM 04 and NM 10, but this has not been confirmed. At least 16 were modified for motorized traction, presumably with steel wheels and pneumatic tires, for service with the Light Division.

== German use ==
The Germans designated guns they captured after the Battle of the Netherlands as the 7.5 cm Feldkanone 243(h), as well as 7.5 cm Feldkanone 241(h) (for the OM 04 model) and 7.5 cm Feldkanone 242(h) (for the NM 10 model). These guns were issued to German occupation units during World War II.

== Photo Gallery ==
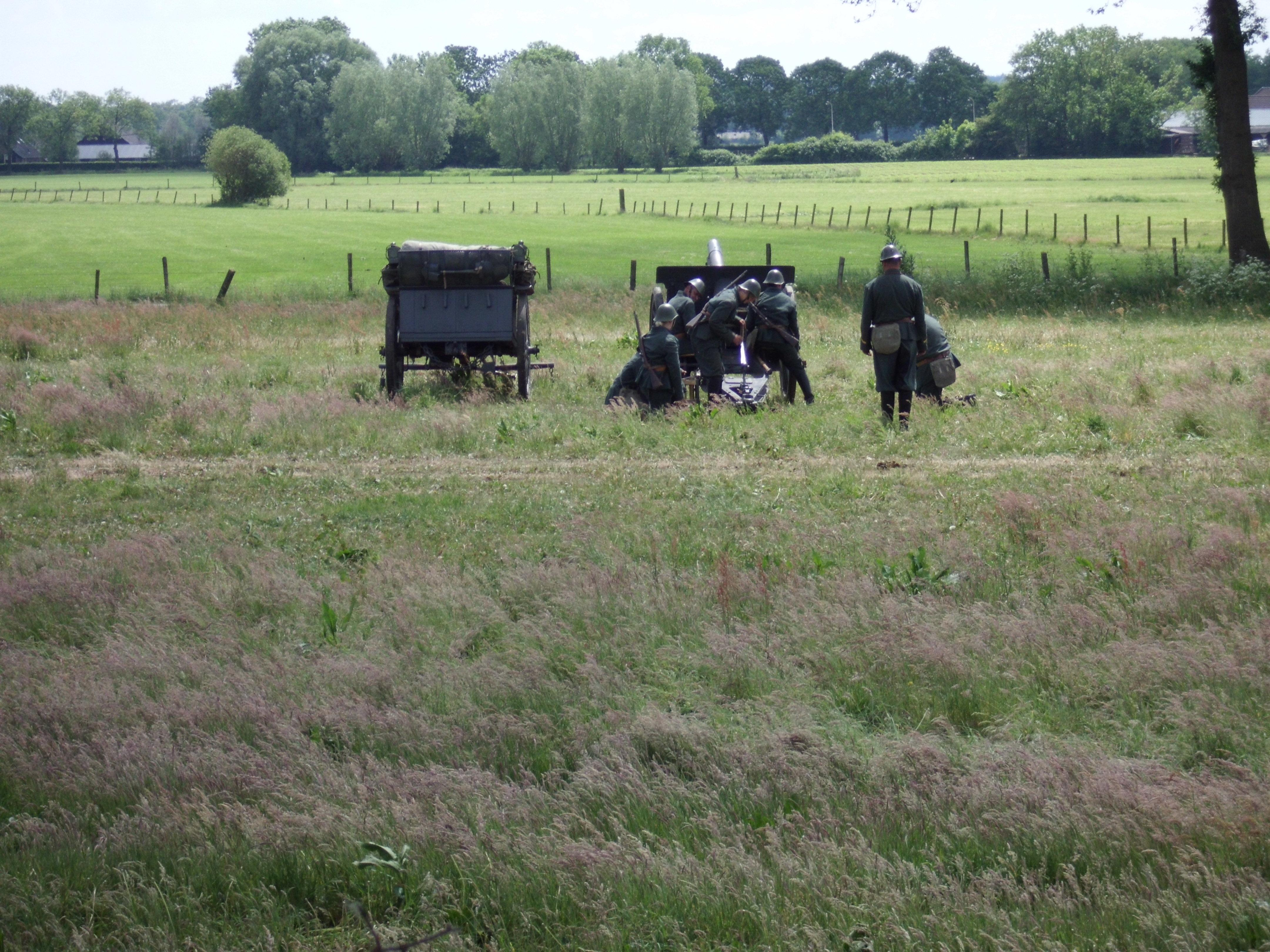
A 7 veld gun with caisson.

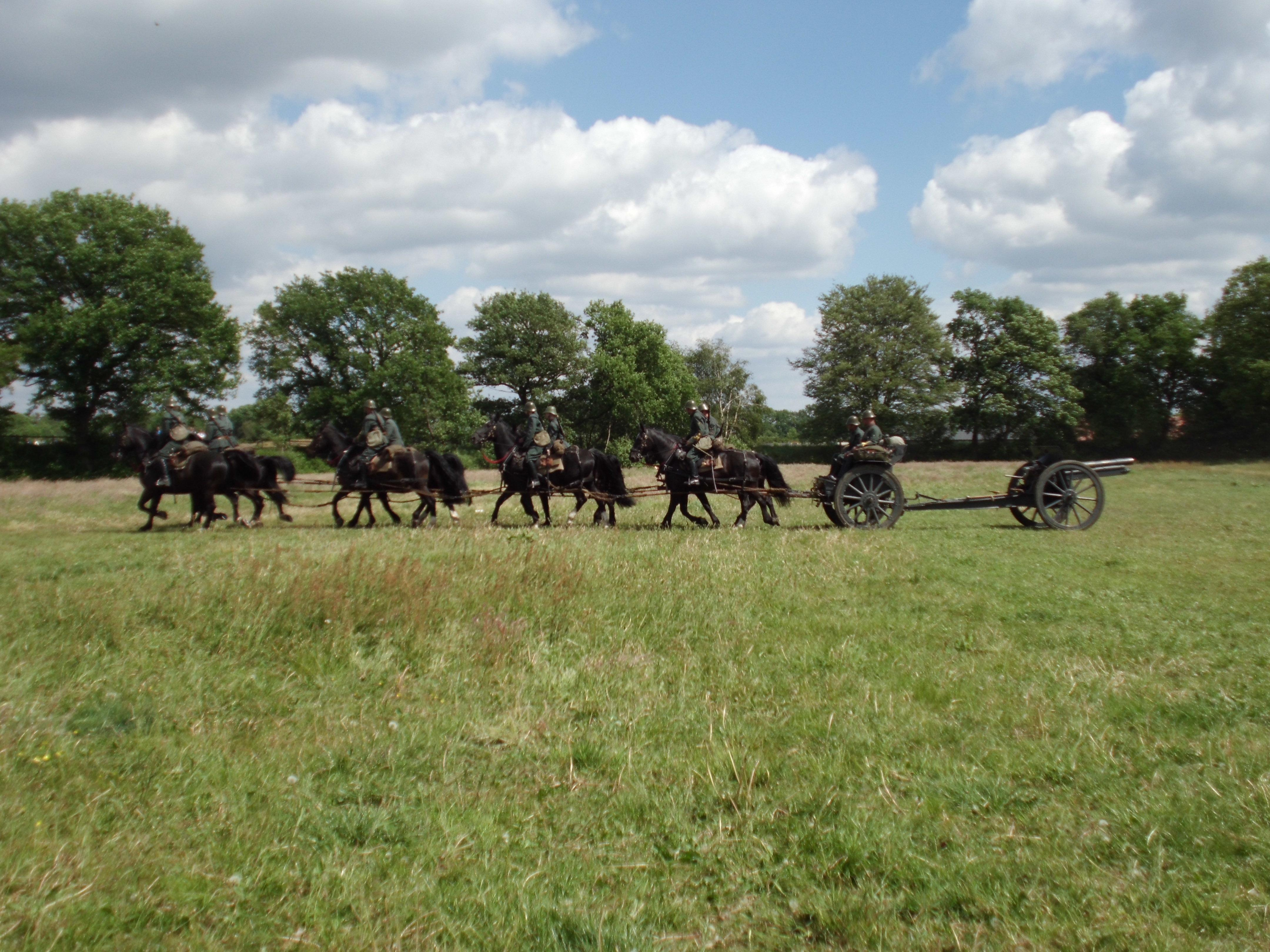
A 7 veld gun with caisson and horse team.
