= Trbušnica (Loznica) =

Trbušnica Трбушница (Serbian)
- Village (Selo)
- Location within Serbia
- Coordinates: 44°29′N 19°11′E
- Country: Serbia
- District: Mačva District
- Municipality: Loznica

Area
  - Total: 12.45 km^{2} (4.81 sq mi)
- Elevation: 296 m (971 ft)

Population (2011)
  - Total: 836
  - Density: 67.1/km^{2} (174/sq mi)
- Time zone: UTC+1 (CET)
  - Summer (DST): UTC+2 (CEST)

Trbušnica (Serbian Cyrillic: Трбушница) is a village located in the municipality of Loznica, western Serbia. According to the 2011 census, the village has a population of 836 inhabitants. A border crossing between Serbia and Bosnia and Herzegovina is located in the village. The youngest soldier of World War I, Momčilo Gavrić was born here.
