= Miša Aleksić-Marinko =

Serbian Chetnik (1876–1923)

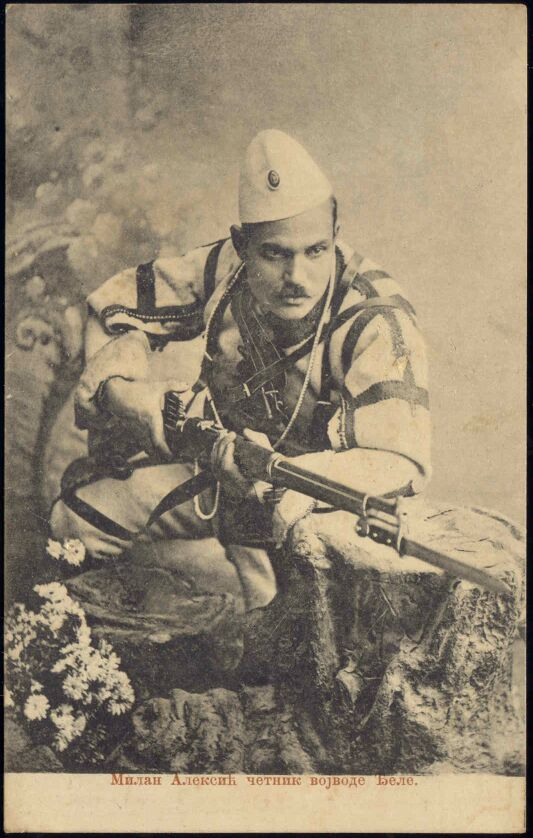
- Born: Milan Aleksić; 1876; Raška region, Ottoman Empire (now Serbia)
- Died: May 27, 1923 (aged 47); Veliki Bečkerek, Kingdom of Serbs, Croats and Slovenes (now Serbia)
- Military career
- Allegiance: Serbian Chetniks (1904–08); (Kingdom of Serbia) Serbian Army (1912–18)
- Service years: 1904–1918
- Nicknames: Miša, Marinko
- Unit: Stefan Nedić-Ćela's band

Milan Aleksić (Serbian Cyrillic: Милан Алексић), nicknamed Miša (Миша), known by his nom de guerre Marinko (Маринко), was a Serbian Chetnik active from 1905 to 1918. He was born in Raška, at the time part of the Ottoman Empire. He fled Ottoman tyranny to Kuršumlija, in the Kingdom of Serbia, where he graduated from the Military Academy as a non-commissioned officer. He joined the Serbian Chetnik Organization in 1905, fighting under Jovan Babunski and Gligor Sokolović in Poreč and on the Babuna against Bulgarian and Albanian bands. He was an assistant of the Upper Staff of Panta Radosavljević-Dunavski, Nikola Janković-Kosovski and Pavle Blažarić as a non-commissioned officer. In 1908, he worked with Vojislav Tankosić in training volunteers in Bosnia. He is regarded a hero in all wars between 1912 and 1918, during which he had the rank of lieutenant colonel. He died of exhaustion in Veliki Bečkerek (modern Zrenjanin), in Banat, on May 27, 1923.

== Gallery ==
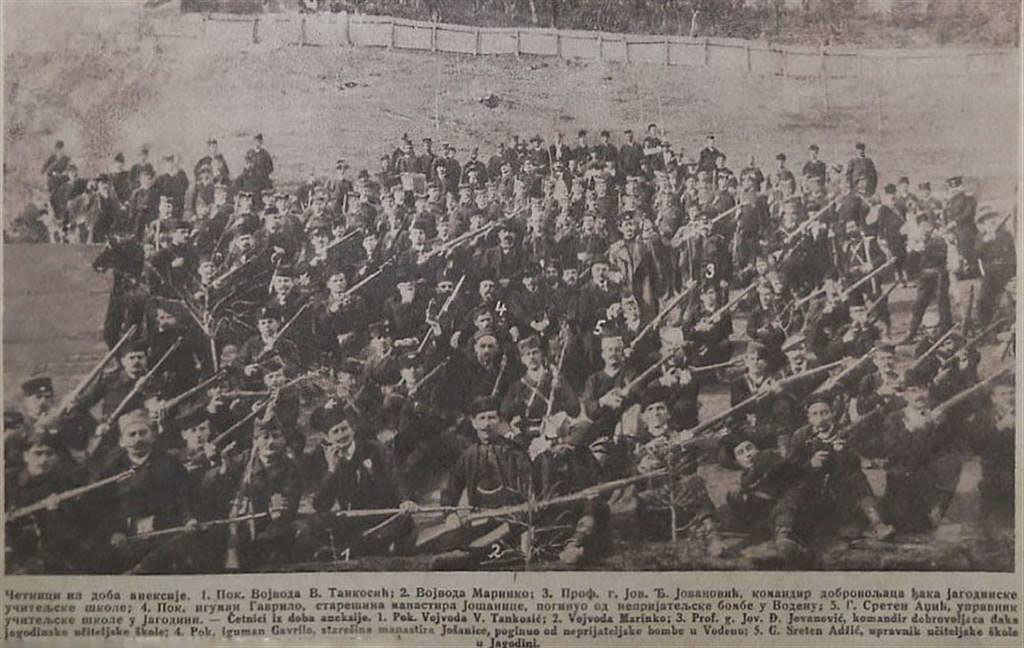
Chetniks during the Austro-Hungarian annexation of Bosnia (1908), Marinko is noted as (2)

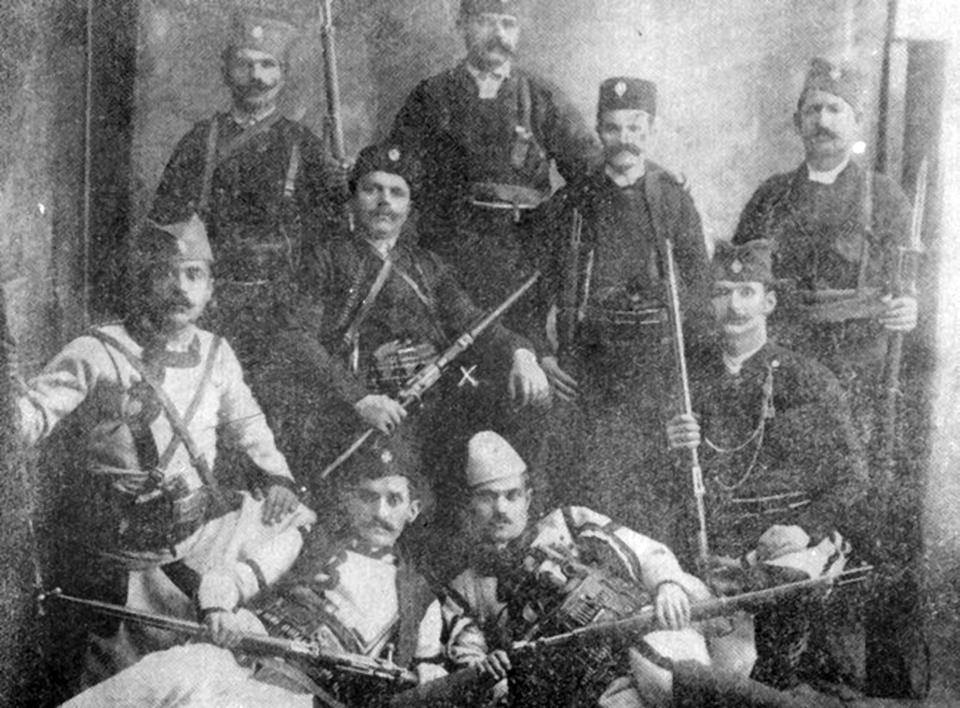
Stefan Nedić-Ćela and his band, Marinko laying at the right
