= Dušan Dimitrijević =

Dušan Dimitrijević–Dule
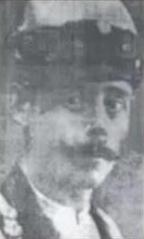
- Born: December 9, 1882; Rabrovo, Kingdom of Serbia (present-day Serbia)
- Died: August 6, 1964 (aged 81); Yugoslavia
- Military career
- Allegiance: Serbian Chetnik Organization (1903–08); (Kingdom of Serbia) Serbian Army (1912–18)
- Service years: 1904–18
- Rank: vojvoda (duke)
- Nickname: Vojvoda Dule
- Conflicts: Macedonian Struggle

Dušan Dimitrijević (Serbian Cyrillic: Душан Димитријевић; December 9, 1882 – August 6, 1964), known as Vojvoda Dule (Војвода Дуле), was a Serbian Chetnik commander active in Old Serbia during the Macedonian Struggle, also participating in the Balkan Wars and as a regular soldier in the First World War.

== Life ==
Dimitrijević was born on December 9, 1882, in Rabrovo (now part of Kučevo), in the Kingdom of Serbia (present-day Serbia). As a student in the Great Law School he joined the work of Youth groups against the Obrenović dynasty. As an editor of Oslobođenje ("Liberation"), he gave moral support to the Chetnik Organization. In 1904 he himself joined the četa (band) of Vojislav Tankosić and participated in the Fight on Čelopek. On the eve of the First Balkan War he was part of an important mission sent to the Albanians, and met with Isa Boletini. In 1912 he showed courage in the regular units of the Serbian Army. He was seriously wounded during the First Balkan War but did not wish to wait for a full recovery, instead rejoined his unit only half recovered. In the First World War he was a guerilla fighter, and he established a Serbian conspirational organization in the vicinity of Visoki, Sarajevo and Srebrenica in 1914. He was seriously wounded three more times, but as before he rejoined his unit at the front half recovered. He was awarded the Order of the Star of Karađorđe with Swords (IV). He was the chief of the Serbian delegation at the Allied Reparations Committee in Paris. After the War, he returned to law and published a series of books in the field. He was elected a state deputy in 1923, on the list of the Agrarian Party.

== Gallery ==
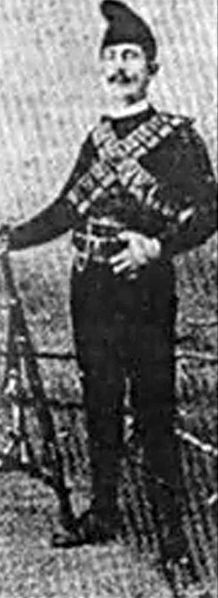
Dule in Black Chetnik gear

== See also ==
- List of Chetnik voivodes

== Sources ==
- Krakov, Stanislav (1990) [1930], Plamen četništva (in Serbian), Belgrade: Hipnos
- Trbić, Vasilije (1996). Memoari: 1898-1912 (in Serbian). Kultura. ISBN 9788678010132.
