= Canon de 75 mle TR =

Canon de 75 modèle 1905 à tir rapide
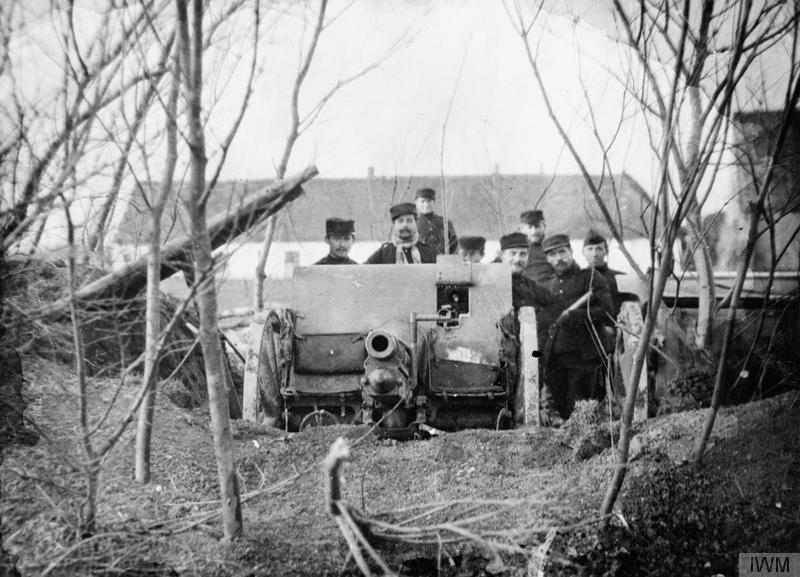
- Type: Field gun
- Place of origin: German Empire

Service history
- In service: 1905?-1945
- Used by: Belgium; Nazi Germany; Hungary
- Wars: World War I, World War II

Production history
- Designer: Krupp
- Manufacturer: Fonderie Royale des Canons
- Produced: 1905?-1914

Specifications
- Mass: 1,190 kilograms (2,620 lb)
- Length: 2.25 m (7 ft 5 in)
- Barrel length: 1.7445 m (5 ft 9 in) L/30
- Shell: Fixed QF 75 x 280 R 6.52 kilograms (14.4 lb)
- Caliber: 75 mm (2.95 in)
- Breech: Horizontal sliding-block
- Recoil: Hydro-spring
- Carriage: Pole trail
- Elevation: -10° to +21°
- Traverse: 6° 32'
- Muzzle velocity: 540 m/s (1,771 ft/s)
- Maximum firing range: 9,900 metres (10,800 yd)

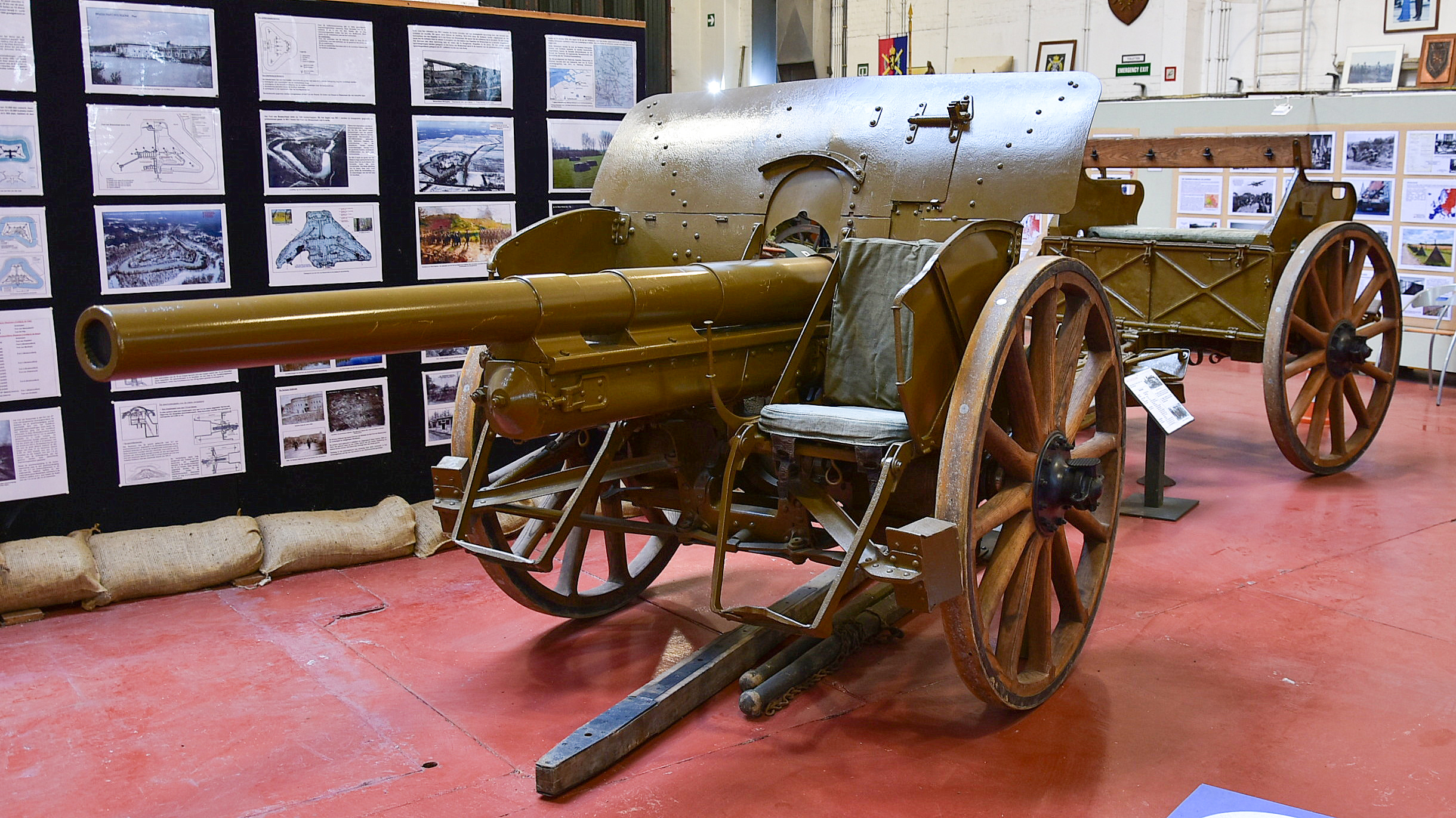
Canon de 75 mle TR at the Site Gunfire Brasschaat-Museum in Brasschaat, Belgium

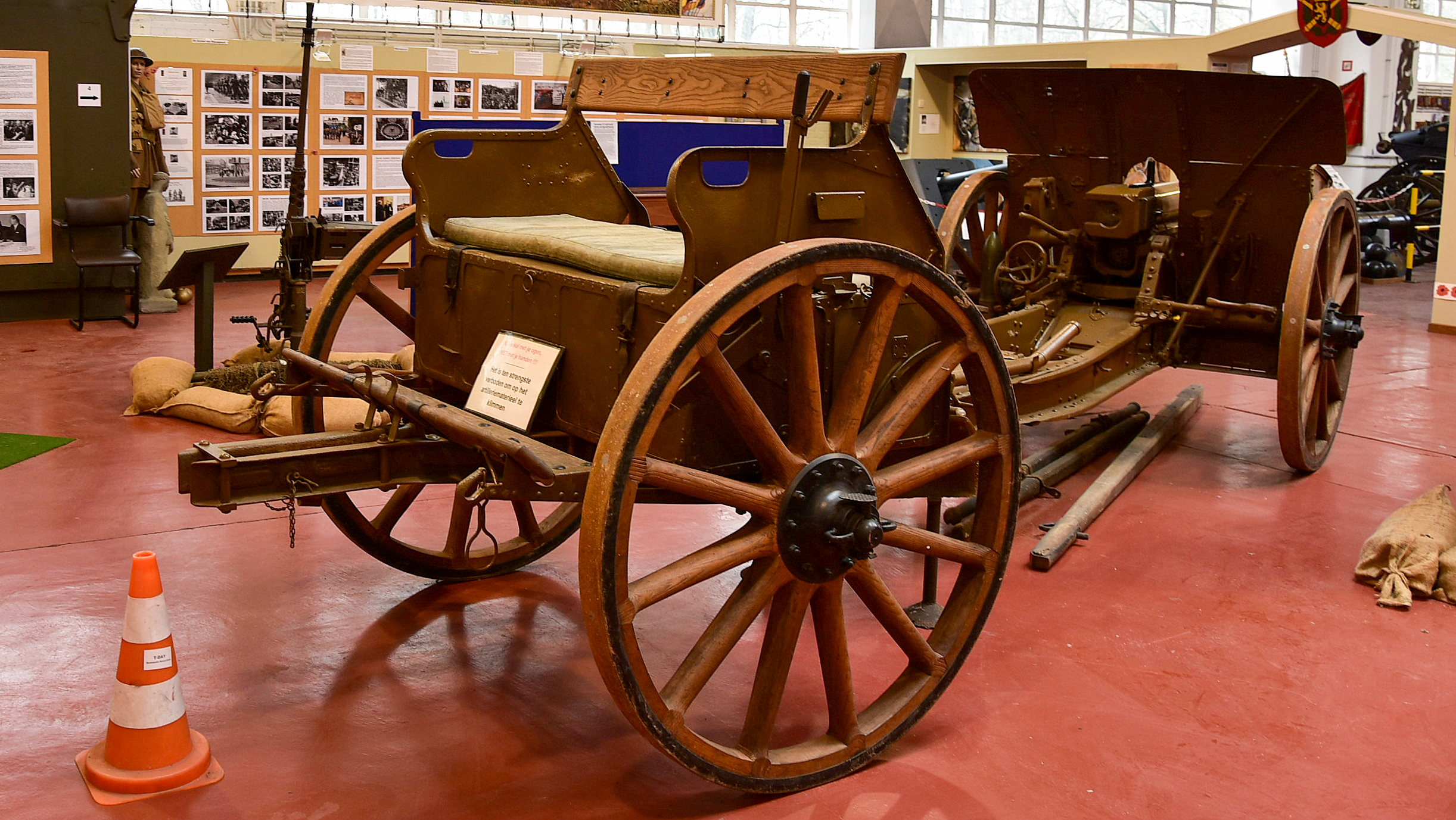
Canon de 75 mle TR at the Site Gunfire Brasschaat-Museum in Brasschaat, Belgium

The Canon de 75 modèle 1905 à tir rapide (abbreviated to Canon de 75 mle TR) was a field gun used by Belgium during World War I and World War II.

It was a license-built copy of the Krupp 7.5 cm Model 1903. Production continued during World War I until the Germans overran the factory in 1914.

After 1940, the Wehrmacht designated this as the 7.5 cm FK 235(b), armed occupation forces in Belgium with them and handed some over to the Hungarians.
