= Stevan Nedić =

Serbian Chetnik commander (1895–1923)

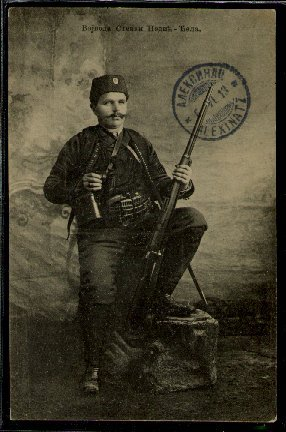
- "Vojvoda Stevan Nedić–Ćela", postcard dated 1913, from Aleksinac
- Born: 1875; Strugovo, Ottoman Empire (now R. Macedonia)
- Died: 1923 (aged 47–48); Strugovo, Yugoslavia
- Military career
- Allegiance: Internal Macedonian Revolutionary Organization (1902–1903); Serbian Chetnik Organization (1903–1908) and (Kingdom of Serbia) Serbian Army (1912–18)
- Service years: 1902–1918
- Rank: Voivode (Vojvoda)
- Nickname: "Ćela"
- Conflicts: Chetniks in Macedonia; Balkan Wars; World War I

Stevan Nedić (Serbian Cyrillic: Стеван Недић; 1875–1923), nicknamed Ćela (Ћела), was a Serbian Chetnik commander in Old Serbia and Macedonia.

== Life ==
Nedić was born in 1875, in the village of Strugovo near Bitola, in the Ottoman Empire (now R. Macedonia). He received his nickname Ćela (slang for "head"), due to his Typhoid fever that left marks on his head. He joined the Bulgarian-organized Internal Macedonian Revolutionary Organization (IMRO) as a fighter in the bands of Georgi Sugarev and Gligor Sokolović. In 1902 he befriended Milorad Gođevac, the founder of the Serbian Chetnik Organization. He participated in the Ilinden Uprising. He joined the Serbian Chetniks in 1903, and in 1905 he and Jovan Babunski cross the Vardar for the Veles region. He participated in the battles of Fight on Čelopek (1905), Oreških Livada and Borba na Kurtovom kamenu near Krapa (1906). He was an active fighter in the Balkan Wars and the First World War (1912–18), then after the Serbian liberation he became a municipality president in his home village, a post he held until his murder. He was murdered in 1923 by a Bulgarian nationalist agent.

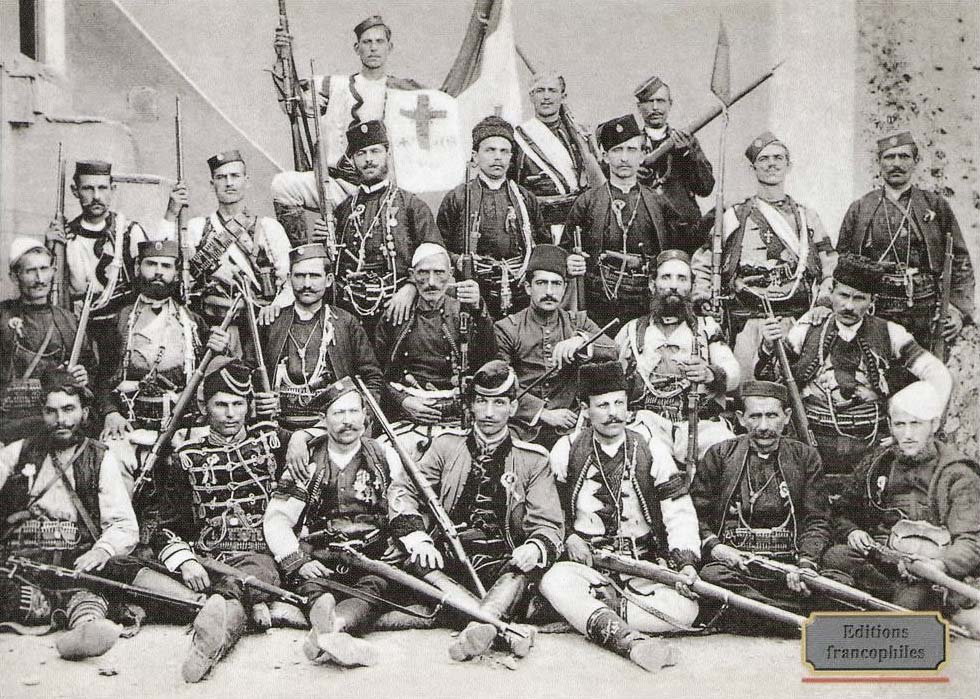
Top Chetniks during Young Turk Revolution.

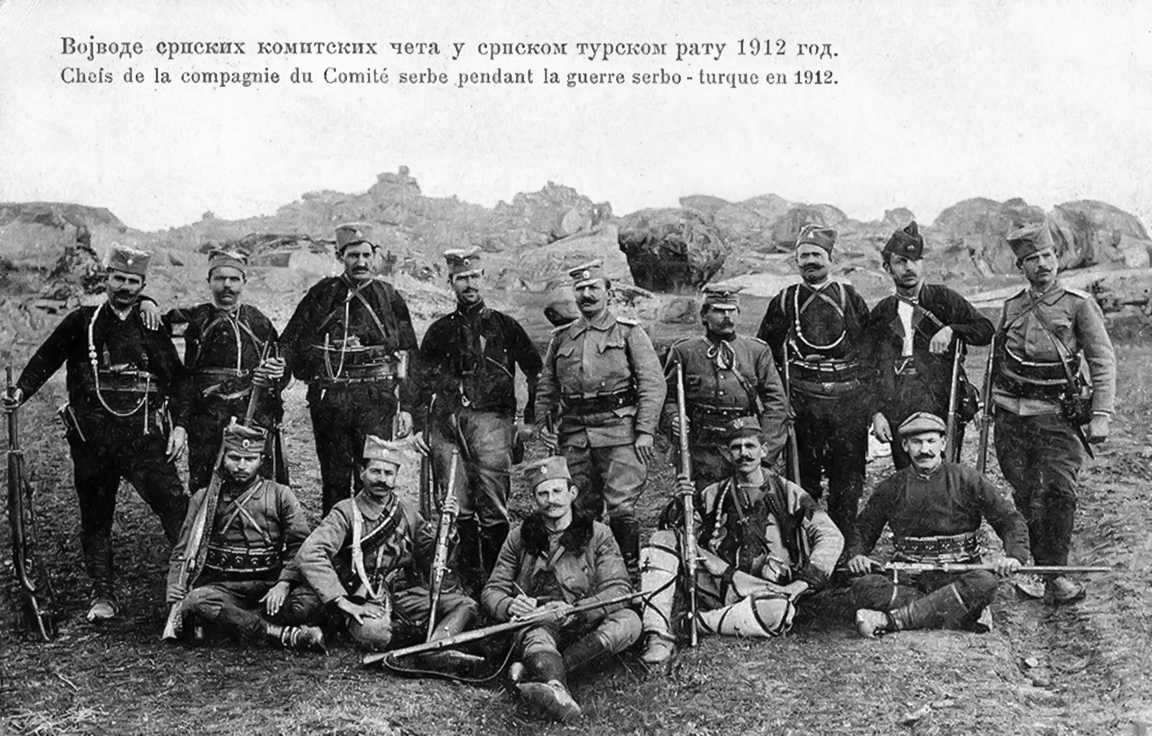
Vojvoda Vuk's band during the Balkan Wars.

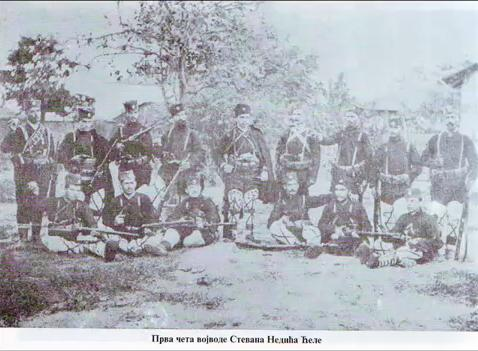
Ćela with his first band (year unknown).

== See also ==
- List of Chetnik voivodes

== Sources ==
- Krakov, Stanislav (1990) [1930]. Plamen četništva (in Serbian). Belgrade: Hipnos.
- Народна енциклопедија српско-хрватско словеначка, Београд 1929, књига 4, 655.
