= Momčilo Gavrić (soldier) =

Serbian child soldier (1906–1993)

Lance sergeant Momčilo Gavrić
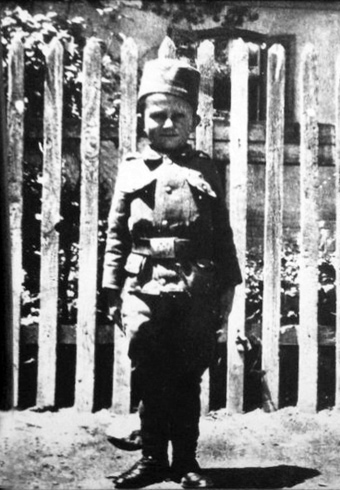
- Momčilo Gavrić in Loznica, 1914.
- Born: 1 May 1906; Trbušnica, near Loznica, Kingdom of Serbia
- Died: 28 April 1993 (aged 86); Belgrade, Serbia, FR Yugoslavia
- Spouse: Kosara Gavrić
- Military career
- Allegiance: Kingdom of Serbia; Kingdom of Yugoslavia
- Rank: Lance Sergeant
- Awards

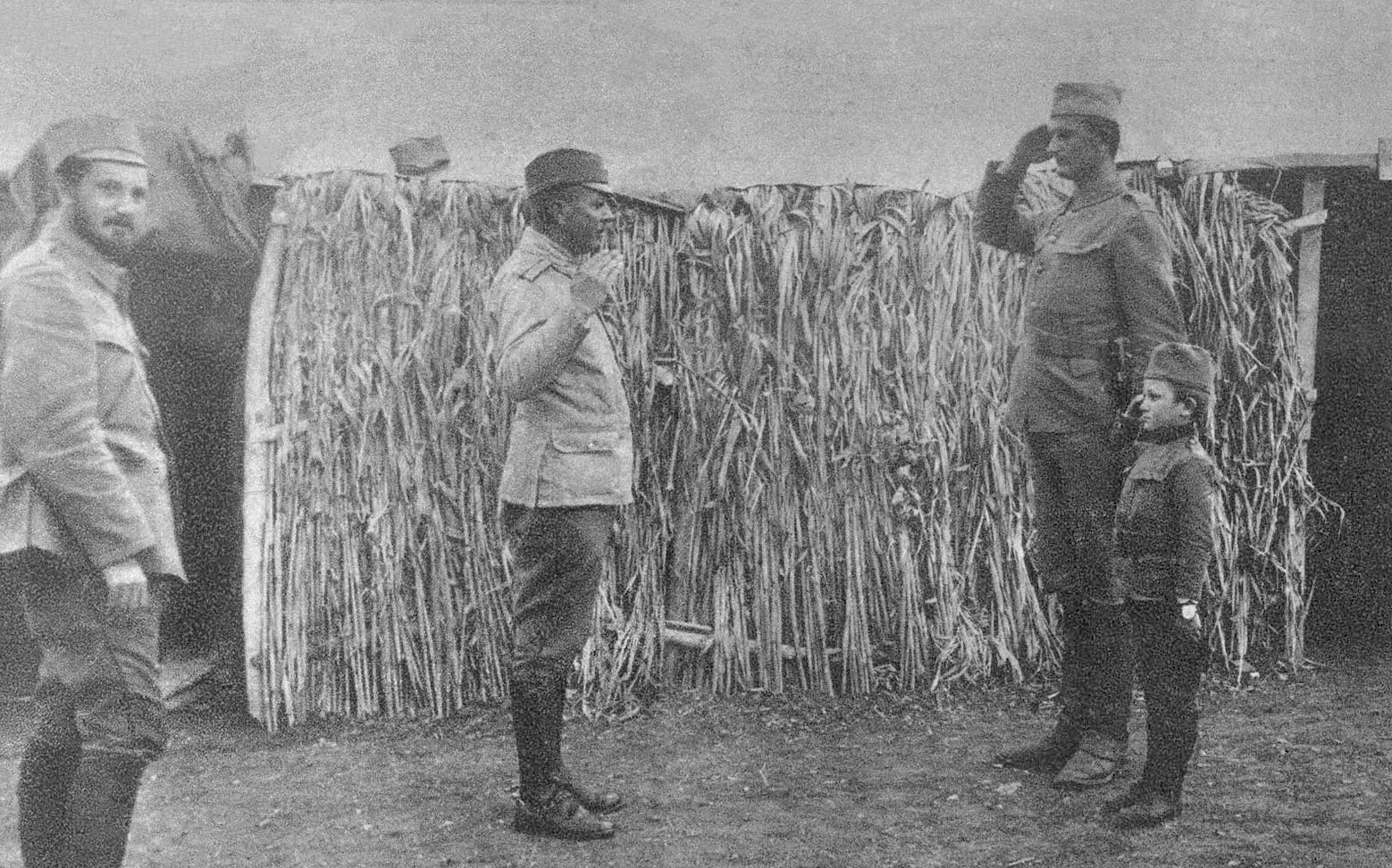
Momčilo Gavrić and another soldier reporting to major Stevan Tucović, 1916.

Momčilo Gavrić (Serbian Cyrillic: Момчило Гаврић; 1 May 1906 – 28 April 1993) was the youngest Serbian soldier of World War One; he became a soldier at the age of eight.

== Biography ==
He was born on 1 May 1906, in Trbušnica, near Loznica, near the slopes of the mountain Gučevo, as the eighth child of eleven, in the family of Alimpije and Jelena Gavrić.

=== World War I ===
In the beginning of August 1914, Austro-Hungarian soldiers of 42nd Croatian Home Guard Infantry Division maimed and hanged his father, mother, grandmother, his three sisters, and four of his brothers. His house was also set on fire. Momčilo survived because he was not at home when it happened—his father had sent him to his uncle earlier.

Left without family and without a home, Momčilo went to find the 6th Artillery Division of the Royal Serbian Army, which was near Gučevo at the time. Major Stevan Tucović, brother of Dimitrije Tucović, accepted Gavrić into his unit after hearing about what had happened, and assigned Miloš Mišović, a battery scout soldier in the unit, to be Gavrić's caretaker. The same evening, he took revenge by showing his caretaker Miloš Mišovic the location of the Austro-Hungarian soldiers in his home village Trbušnica; upon finding the Austro-Hungarian soldiers intoxicated and drunk on rakija and completely disorganized, Miloš Mišović threw two bombs at the soldiers and killed all of them before he and Momčilo Gavrić quickly fled the scene and returned back to meet up with the rest of the soldiers of the 6th Artillery Division, as told by his son Branislav Gavrić in an interview.

At the age of 8, after the Battle of Cer, he was promoted to the rank of Corporal by the commander of his unit, and given a military uniform.

When his unit was sent to Thessaloniki, Major Tucović sent him to Sorovits where he hastily went through the equivalent of four grades of elementary education.

In Kajmakčalan, Field Marshal Mišić was stunned when he saw a uniformed ten-year-old boy in the trenches. Major Tucović explained the situation to him; that Gavrić had been with them since the Battle of Cer, and that he had both been taught discipline and been wounded during his time in the unit. Mišić promoted Gavrić to Lance Sergeant, and the order was read out to the whole division.

=== Post-war life ===
After the liberation of Belgrade, Major Tucović made sure that Gavrić would receive aid from a British mission that was helping war orphans in Serbia. He was sent to the United Kingdom in Faversham, Kent, and finished his education at the Henry Wreight School (now merged into Queen Elizabeth's Grammar School, Faversham), graduating in 1921. He returned to Serbia the same year, after Serbian Prime Minister Nikola Pašić ordered the return of all children to Serbia. In Trbušnica, he was reunited with his three brothers who had survived the murders in 1914.

According to his son Branislav, Momčilo Gavrić had an incident with the law in 1929. He was working in Šabac and Belgrade when he reached the age of conscription, and at the military barracks in Slavonska Požega, he reported that he already had been in the army during the war. He also said that he had been wounded, and had received the Albanian Commemorative Medal. However, an ethnic Croat in the Royal Yugoslav Army tried to push Gavrić into signing a confession that he had told a lie. He refused, and was sent to prison, spending two months there.

After another period of military service, he returned to Belgrade, where he learnt graphic design and took his driver's licence. There, he also married his wife Kosara, with whom he worked in the Vapa paper mill.

Branislav Gavrić further told that during the Second World War, Momčilo was imprisoned twice by the German occupying forces. After the war, in 1947, OZNA arrested him for saying that the Albanians were no brothers to Serbs and remarking how he "felt that brotherhood of theirs in 1915, when they were killing us", during a time when the presidents of Yugoslavia and Albania (Josip Broz Tito and Enver Hoxha) were great friends.

In 1987, he participated in a Yugoslav documentary about his experiences during the First World War.

=== Legacy ===
Momčilo Gavrić died in Belgrade in 1993. There are memorials dedicated to him on the island of Corfu and in the Jadar Museum in Loznica. In 2014, a street in Loznica was named after him.

On 2 April 2015, the Serbian government decided to raise a monument in Belgrade dedicated to Gavrić.

== Gallery ==
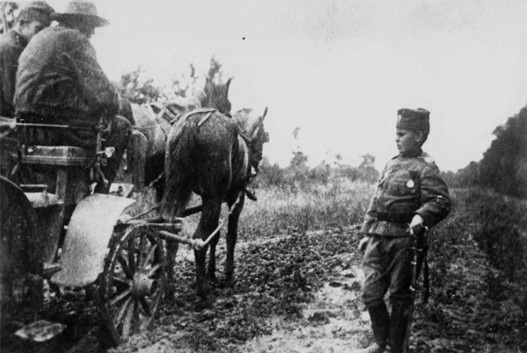
Wartime photograph from 1914 with Momčilo Gavrić.

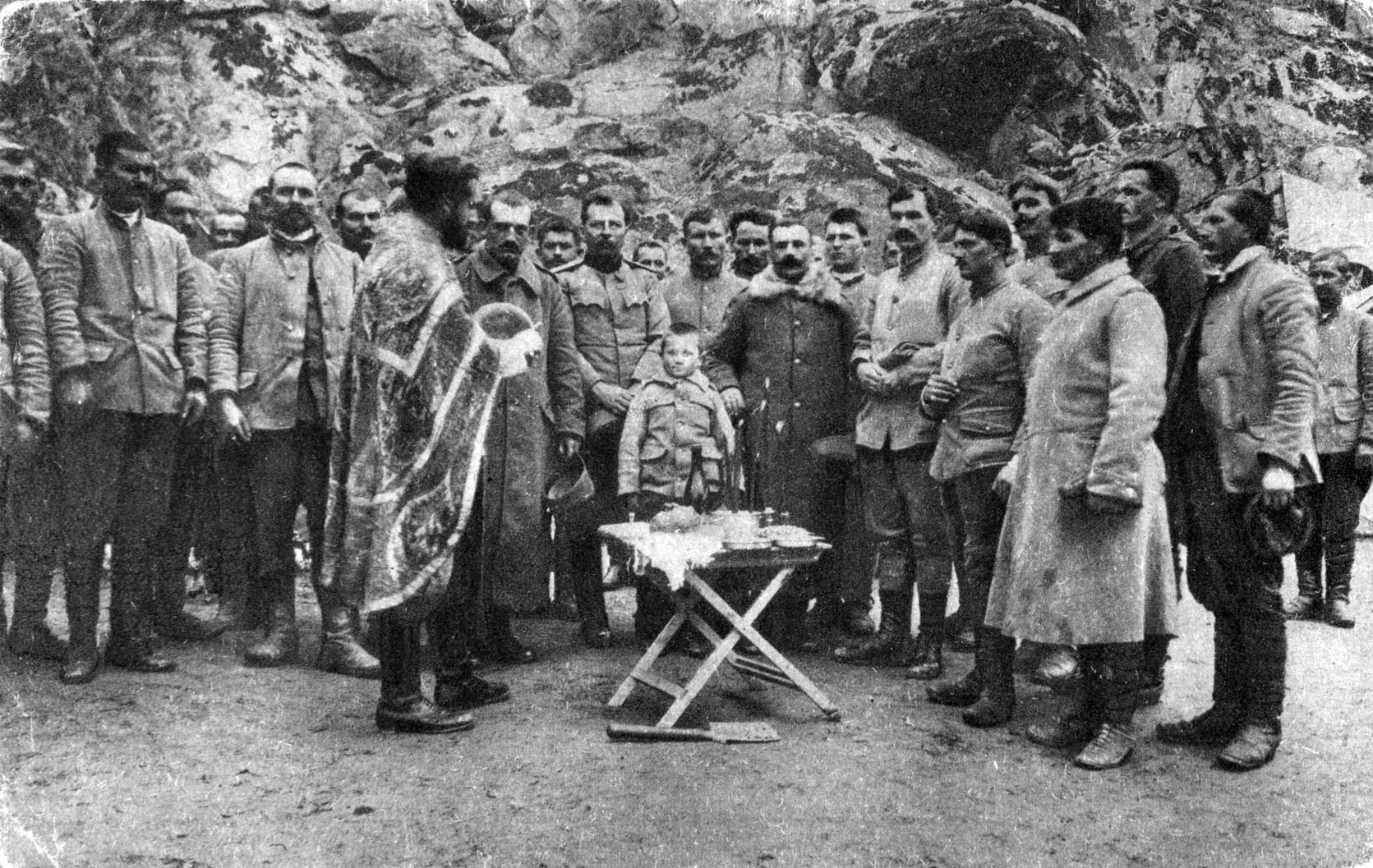
Momčilo Gavrić with other Serbian soldiers.

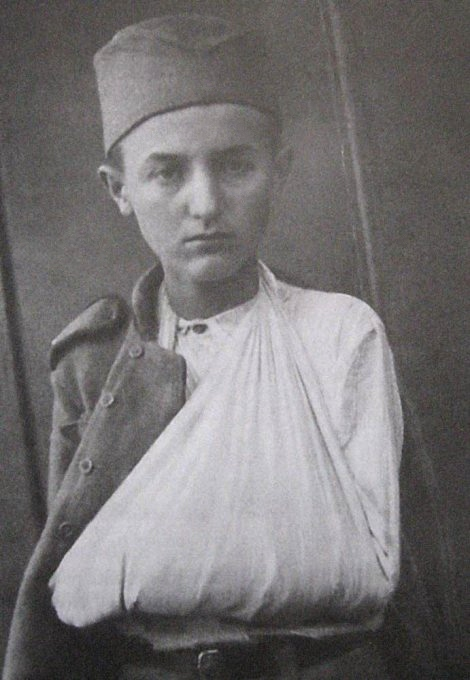
Photograph of Momčilo Gavrić with a wounded arm, 1918.

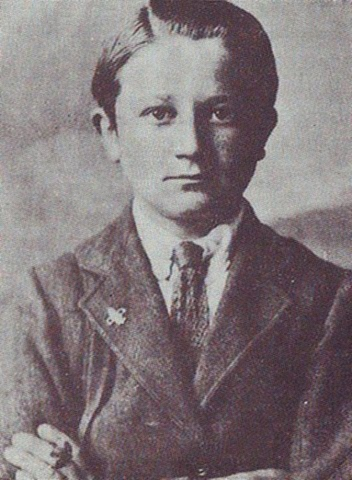
Graduation portrait taken in Faversham, Kent, 1921.

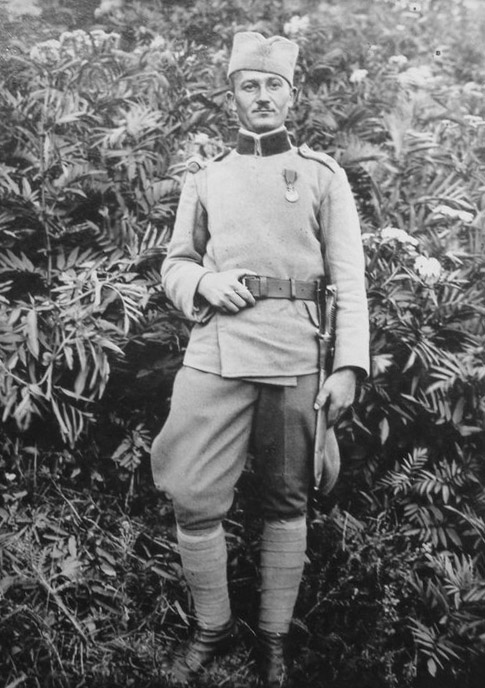
Post-war photograph of Momčilo Gavrić in uniform.

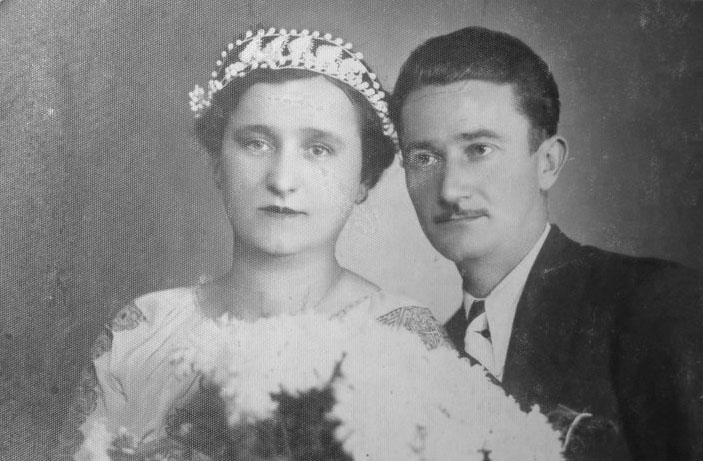
Kosara and Momčilo Gavrić, 1939.

== See also ==
- Serbian Campaign (World War I)
- Dragoljub Jeličić (1902–1963), Serbian soldier
- Boško Buha (1926–1943), Yugoslav soldier
- Spomenko Gostić (1978–1993), Bosnian Serb soldier
- Military use of children
