= Dragutin Jovanović-Lune =

Serbian politician (1892–1932)

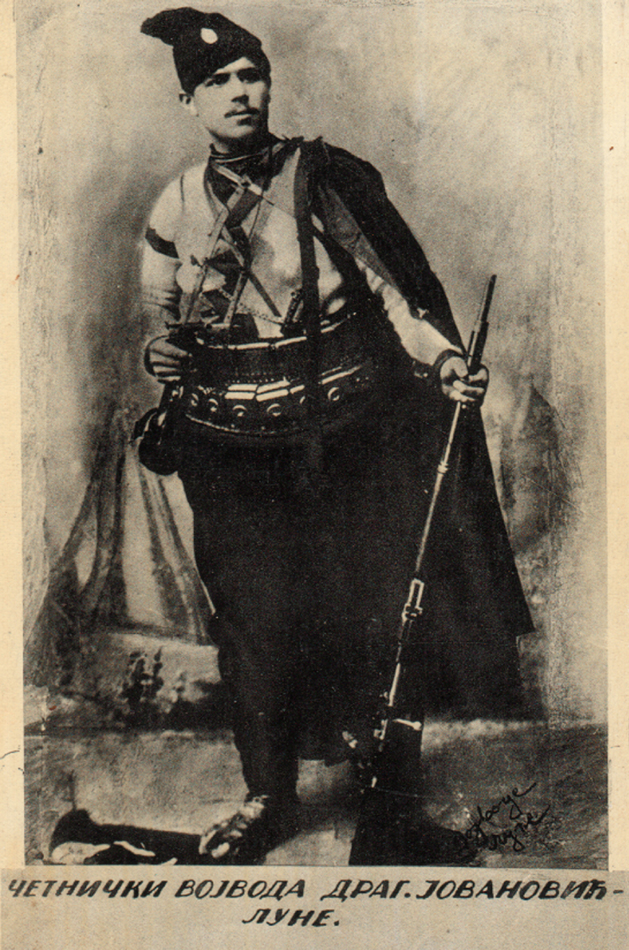
Lune while fighting in Old Serbia.

Dragutin Jovanović (Serbian Cyrillic: Драгутин Јовановић, 1892 – July 2, 1932), known by his nickname Lune (Луне), was a Serbian guerrilla fighter, officer, politician, delegate and mayor of Vrnjci. He was awarded several times for his service in the Balkan Wars and World War I.

== Early life ==
Jovanović was born in Aleksinac, Kingdom of Serbia. His parents moved to Aleksinac from Prilep, at the time part of the Ottoman Empire. The family moved to Vrnjačka Banja while Dragutin was a child. He finished grammar school in Vrnjačka Banja before enrolling in a technical college. later, he worked on the construction of Stalac-Kruševac-Užice railway. It was there that the chief engineer gave him the name "Lune", a nickname that he carried throughout his career.

== Struggle for Macedonia, Balkan Wars and World War I ==
He joined the Serbian Chetnik Organization, the detachment of Vojvoda Vuk on March 22, 1911, fighting in Old Serbia. He participated in several battles in Old Serbia and Macedonia as well as the First and the Second Balkan War. After the outbreak of World War I with the rank of sergeant, he joined the volunteer unit of Vojvoda Vuk once again. In October 1914 Lune captured 10 Austro-Hungarians officers and almost 300 non-commissioned officers and soldier at Kurjačica, Bosnia-Hercegovina. He participated in almost all the major battles with the Serbian Army and on 29 November 1916 at Grunište, Bitolsko Mariovo, where Vojvoda Vuk was killed, Lune was wounded in the hand. A year later (November 1917), he received an assignment to infiltrate enemy territory and provide information about troop movement. His detachment was responsible for liberating Old Serbia and Macedonia from the foe in August 1918. He was promoted to the rank of Lieutenant.

== Life in Politics ==
Jovanović went on to retire with the rank of lieutenant on 31 March 1924. He joined the Democratic Party (Yugoslavia), led by Ljubomir Davidović, became president of the Vrnjacka municipality, and in 1927 he was elected deputy.

During the shooting of Stjepan Radić (after giving a vitriolic speech against Serbs, especially the fallen in the wars) at the National Assembly on June 20, 1928, Lune happened to be sitting right next Puniša Račić. Unfortunately, Radić died weeks later of gunshot wounds that were badly treated. At the trial in May and in June 1929 Lune had to fend off charges of complicity to the death of the Croatian member of parliament.

After these events, Lune left politics and participated only in the work of Chetnik associations led by Kosta Pećanac.

== Assassination ==
Dragutin Jovanović Lune was killed on July 2, 1932, at a train station in Niš by police agent Stevan Protić, whom he beat up during a luggage check. This murder has to this day remained veiled in suspicion. Lune's family immediately believed that the event was staged by Kosta Pećanac, while some historians have pointed out some other political motive.

== Bibliography ==
- Dušan Cvetković. Vojvoda Lune: istiniti događaj iz doba okupacije u 10 slika s pevanjem, V. Pešić, Niš, 1933.
- Svetislav Jaćimović. Vojvoda Lune u narodnim pesmama, Štampa Žikišon, Paraćin, 193?
- Vojislav Erac, Vojvoda Lune (poezija), Žikišon, Paraćin, 19??
- Radenko Savić. Vojvoda Lune, Štampa Žikišon, 19??
- Dušan Cvetković. Vojvoda Lune: u pesmama i pripovetkama, Miroslav M. Todorović, Niš, 1940.
- Antonije Đurić. Po zapovesti Srbije (roman), „Litopapir“, Čačak, 1994.
- Ognjan Topalović. Vojvoda Lune, Narodna biblioteka „Dr Dušan Radić“, Vrnjačka Banja, 2002. ISBN 86-82843-15-3
- Nina Simić. „Četnički vojvoda Dragutin Jovanović-Lune“, Rasinski anali, br. 4 (leto/jesen 2006), str. 171-172. ISSN 1451-4346
