= Sava Petrović-Grmija =

Sava Grmija
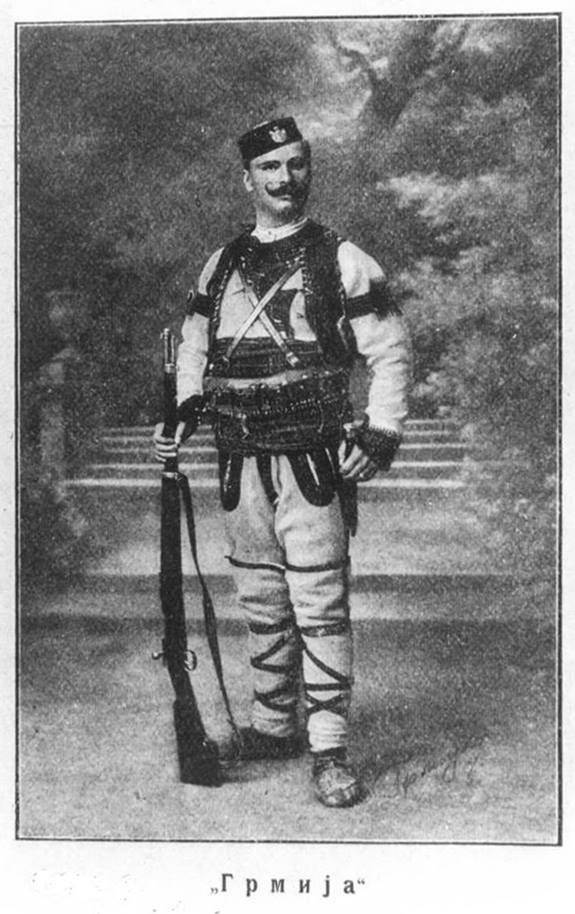
- Sava Grmija in Chetnik gear, between 1906 and 1908.
- Born: Sava Petrović; 23 July 1882; Pristina, Kosovo Vilayet, Ottoman Empire
- Died: 28 October 1914 (aged 32); Loznica, Kingdom of Serbia
- Military career
- Allegiance: Kingdom of Serbia (1905–14); Serbian Chetnik Organization (1906–08)
- Service years: 1905–14
- Rank: sergeant (vodnik); captain (kapetan)
- Nickname: Grmija

Sava Petrović (Serbian Cyrillic: Сава Петровић, 23 July 1882 – 28 October 1914), known as Sava Grmija (Сава Грмија), was a Serbian soldier, member of the Serbian Chetnik Organization and participant in the Balkan Wars and World War I.

== Life ==
Petrović was born in the vicinity of Pristina, by the Germia mountain, at the time part of the Sanjak of Sjenica (now Kosovo). He finished Serbian secondary school in Pristina, and five years of gymnasium in Skopje and Thessaloniki.

In 1905 he fled to the Kingdom of Serbia and entered into the 2nd Infantry Regiment "Knjaz Mihailo" in Niš. After a year, he also entered and finished the Military Academy in Belgrade, after which he served as a sergeant (vodnik) in the 12th Infantry Regiment "Tsar Lazar" in Kruševac. In 1906 he joined the Serbian Chetnik Organization and fought in the Poreče region, after which he was appointed Chief of Upper Staff at the beginning of 1907. His nom de guerre was Grmija.

In the First Balkan War he served as a sergeant in the 1st supernumerary Infantry Regiment and participated in the fighting around the Svirci-Novo Brdo-Kačanik karaula (Ottoman border station). He participated in the fighting in Kosovo, Bitola and Elbasan.

In World War I, he was a commander of the Royal Gendarmerie Detachment, and sought reassignment on the frontline and thus became commander of the 6th supernumerary Infantry Regiment. Fighting on the Gučevo mountain near Loznica, he fell in battle on 28 October 1914. At the time of his death he had the rank of captain (kapetan).

== See also ==
- List of Chetnik voivodes

== Sources ==
- Trbić, Vasilije (1996). Memoari: 1898-1912 (in Serbian). Kultura. pp. 135–140, 288. ISBN 9788678010132.
- Ivanić, Ivan (1910). Maćedonija i maćedondži. Vol. 2. Štampa Savića i Komp.
- Jerinić, D. S. (2008). "Војводе из четничке акције у Старој Србији и Маћедонији 1903-1912". Добровољачки гласник, бр. 32. година 17. Удружење ратних добровољаца 1912-1918: 46.
