= Zafir Premčević =

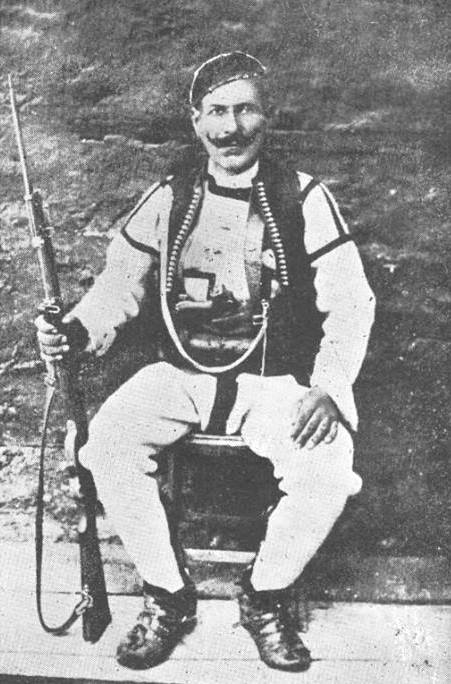
- Born: 1872; Ljupšte, Ottoman Empire (modern R. Macedonia)
- Died: 1937 (aged 65); Yugoslavia
- Military career
- Allegiance: Serbian Chetnik Organization (1903–08); (Kingdom of Serbia) Serbian Army (1912–18)
- Service years: 1904–18
- Rank: vojvoda (duke)
- Conflicts: Macedonian Struggle

Zafir Premčević (Serbian Cyrillic: Зафир Премчевић; 1872–1937) was a Serbian Chetnik commander in Old Serbia and Macedonia during the Macedonian Struggle, who also participated in the Balkan Wars and World War I.

== Life ==
Premčević was born in the village of Ljupšte in the Poreče region, at the time part of the Ottoman Empire (now R. Macedonia). He joined the Serbian Chetnik Organization and organized the first Serbian četa (band) in Poreče in March 1904, which he then submitted to the command of vojvoda (duke) Micko Krstić. Premčević was the assistant of Micko Krstić, and after Micko was returned by the Serbian Committee to Serbia, Premčević became vojvoda of a band in charge of pursuing the Albanian kachaks. He was an active guerilla fighter until 1908, when the Young Turk Revolution saw all rebels putting down their weapons. He participated in the Battle of Kumanovo in the detachment of vojvoda Vojin Popović-Vuk. He died in 1937.

== See also ==
- List of Chetnik voivodes

== Sources ==
- Nikolić, G. (1912). Mirno spavaj vojvodo. Beograd. p. 219.
- Jovanović, P. S. (1935). "Poreče". Naselja i Poreklo stanovništa (28). Beograd: 295–297.
- Trbić, Vasilije (1996). Memoari: 1898-1912. Kultura.
