= Strugovo =

Strugovo Стругово
- Village
- Location within North Macedonia
- Coordinates: 41.200122°N 21.181496°E
- Country: North Macedonia
- Region: Pelagonia
- Municipality: Demir Hisar

Population (2002)
  - Total: 286
- Time zone: UTC+1 (CET)
  - Summer (DST): UTC+2 (CEST)
- Car plates: DH

Strugovo (Macedonian: Стругово) is a village in the municipality of Demir Hisar, in the Pelagonia region of North Macedonia. It lies within the historical area known as Железник (Železnik), a name rooted in the rich iron ore deposits of the surrounding mountains — a landscape that has shaped the region's identity from antiquity through the Ottoman era.

== Geography ==
Strugovo is situated in the hill country west of the Pelagonia plain, in a landscape of forested ridges and agricultural land characteristic of the broader Železnik region. The area falls within the drainage basin of the Crna Reka (Black River) and is framed by the mountains of Ilinska, Bigla, and Plakenska, whose peaks form the watershed separating the Pelagonia plain from the lake regions of Prespa and Ohrid to the west.

== History ==
=== Medieval and Ottoman period ===
The wider Železnik region has been known by many names across the centuries, each reflecting the area's defining natural resource: the Slavic Železnik and the Ottoman Demir Hisar both mean Iron Fortress, a reference to the iron ore abundance of the surrounding mountains. The area formed part of the medieval Macedonian lands that passed under Ottoman control during the late 14th century.

The earliest documentary record of Strugovo dates to the Ottoman tax register (defter) of 1467–1468, which recorded the village as having 30 households, 1 bachelor, and 1 widow — a settlement of modest but established size. The recorded personal names consisted predominantly of Christian Slavic anthroponyms, reflecting the enduring Slavic Macedonian character of the village through the early centuries of Ottoman rule.

The 1467–1468 defter records the following household heads of Strugovo by name: Stajko, sin na Ǵorgo; Petko, sin na Ǵorgo; Andreja, sin na Ǵorgo; Staniša, sin na Ǵorgo; Pejo sin na Nikola; Pejo, sin na Ǵurica; vdovica Ǵura; Popot, sin na Vlade; Spase sin na pop; Novak, siromav; Dimitri, sin na V'lkašin; Ilija, sin na Petre; Ǵorgo, sin na pop; Nako, sin na Radoslav; Stajko, siromav; Dimitri, sin na Janko; Petko mesto Rade; Tale, siromav; Pejo, brat na Tode; Manko, sin na Rade; Dimitri, sin na Ǵorgo; vdovica, žena na Petre; Dimitri, sin na Ǵorgo; Petko, mesto Dimitri; Mile, Staniša; Dujko, sin na Stajko; Jakov, sin na pop; Danko, sin na Radoslav; Pejo, sin na Dapko; Pejo, sin na Dujko; Miho, sin na Petre; Dimitri, sin na Jano; Stajko, sin na Petko.

The names recorded — Dimitri, Petko, Stajko, Pejo, Ilija, Andreja, Spase, Jakov — are recognisably the Slavic Macedonian Christian names still common in the region today, testifying to the continuity of the village's population across more than five and a half centuries.

The village lies within a municipality that, by the 19th century, had become a significant centre of Macedonian Orthodox Christian rural life. The Demir Hisar region produced several figures connected to the Ilinden Uprising of 1903, and the nearby village of Smilevo was the site of the Smilevo Congress, at which the decision to stage armed uprisings throughout Macedonia was taken.

=== Modern period ===
According to the 2002 census, Strugovo had a total of 286 inhabitants, of whom 285 identified as ethnic Macedonians.

== Demographics ==
According to the 2002 census:

Ethnic group	Population
Macedonians	285
Other	1
Total	286

== See also ==
- Demir Hisar Municipality
- Demir Hisar (region)
- Ilinden Uprising
- Smilevo

== Demographics ==
In the 1467/1468 Ottoman defter, the village had 30 households, 1 bachelor and 1 widow. The onomastics consisted of Christian Slavic anthroponyms, with a possible presence of Albanian onomastic variations of general Christian names.

According to the 2002 census, the village had a total of 286 inhabitants. Ethnic groups in the village include:

- Macedonians 285
- Other 1
