= Koporan Čauš =

Trajko Mitrović Jovanović (Serbian Cyrillic: Трајко Митровић; fl. 1904–1923), known by his nom de guerre Koporan Čauš (Копоран Чауш), was a Serbian Chetnik vojvoda (commander). He was born in Orlanci near Kičevo. At first, he was a member of the IMRO, however, as many others, left that organization in the summer of 1904 and left for Serbia. He received his nickname after killing a çavuş, and wearing his bloody koporan (cape) afterwards. He participated in the victory at Čelopek (1905). He was wounded in his right hand fingers. He joined the Royal Serbian Army as a volunteer in the Balkan Wars and World War I. He is mentioned in "Politika" newspaper as visiting Belgrade in late May 1923, a 40-year-old man riven with tuberculosis.

== See also ==
- List of Chetnik voivodes

== Sources ==
Books

- Blažarić, Pavle (2006). Božica Mladenović (ed.). Memoari (in Serbian). Institut za srpsku kulturu. ISBN 9788682797500.
- Đurić, Veljko Đ.; Mijović, Miličko (1993). Ilustrovana istorija četničkog pokreta (in Serbian). Narodna knj.
- Radenić, Andrija; Samardžić, Radovan (2007). Dokumenti o spoljnoj politici Kraljevine Srbije 1903-1914: dodatak 2. Organizacija Srpska odbrana 1906. godine. Srpska akademija nauka i umetnosti. Odeljenje istorijskih nauka.
- Trbić, Vasilije (1996). Aleksandar Drašković (ed.). Memoari (1898–1912) (in Serbian). Belgrade: Kultura.

Journals

- Krvave borbe srpskih četa po macedoniji i njihov rad od početka 1903 do danas. Savić. 1912.
