= Milutin Krunich =

Milutin Krunich was a patriotic Serbian lieutenant and author whose stories were used to create a Serbophil sentiment in America leading up to the American entry into World War I.

== Serbia crucified ==
A patriotic Serbian book Serbia Crucified: The Beginning in 1918 was written with the help of Leah Marie Bruce from Berkeley California. It was reviewed in The Survey in 1918. It was reviewed again in 1919.

It contains four stories

1. "The Fall of Nish"
2. "The Graveyard by the Morava"
1. "The Place of the Skull"
2. "Our Child"

The second and third of these appeared in the issue of The Atlantic Monthly, Volume 119 in 1917.

Leah Marie Bruce also wrote letters to the editor reiterating the stories from the book.

== Bibliography ==
- The graveyard by the Morava (1917)
- Serbia Crucified: The Beginning (1918)
- 'We, the Cavemen' (1925)
- Then Christs Fought Hard (1925)
