= Gornji Ulišnjak =

Village in Maglaj, Bosnia and Herzegovina

- Village
- Location within Bosnia and Herzegovina
- Coordinates: 44°31′51″N 18°08′25″E
- Country: Bosnia and Herzegovina
- Entity: Federation of Bosnia and Herzegovina
- Canton: Zenica-Doboj
- Municipality: Maglaj

Area
  - Total: 1.61 sq mi (4.16 km^{2})

Population (2013)
  - Total: 106
  - Density: 66.0/sq mi (25.5/km^{2})
- Time zone: UTC+1 (CET)
  - Summer (DST): UTC+2 (CEST)

Gornji Ulišnjak is a village in the municipality of Maglaj, Bosnia and Herzegovina.

== Demographics ==
According to the 2013 census, its population was 106.

Ethnicity in 2013
Ethnicity	Number	Percentage
Bosniaks	102	96.2%
Serbs	4	3.8%
Total	106	100%
