= Dragoljub Jeličić =

Serbian soldier (c. 1902–1963)

Sergeant Dragoljub Jeličić
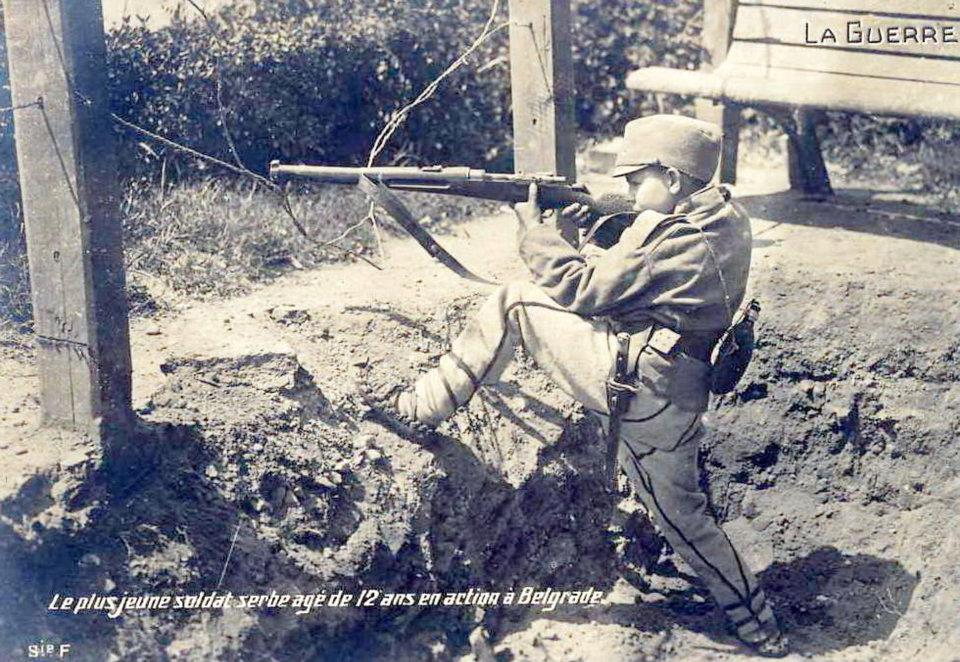
- Jeličić in 1914
- Born: c. 1902; Kingdom of Serbia
- Died: 1963 (aged 60–61) Nikšić, SR Montenegro, Yugoslavia (now Montenegro)
- Allegiance: Kingdom of Serbia; Socialist Federal Republic of Yugoslavia
- Rank: Sergeant
- Awards

Dragoljub Jeličić (Serbian Cyrillic: Драгољуб Јеличић; c. 1902 – 1963) was one of the youngest soldiers in the Royal Serbian Army during the First World War.

== Biography ==
The Jeličić family originally lived in Kordun, in present-day Croatia, but emigrated as refugees to the Serbian town of Šabac, hoping for a better life there. When Serbia was invaded by Austria-Hungary, Dragoljub had just begun elementary school. His father was among the ones that were killed in the initial battles of the war.

As the Austro-Hungarian Army approached Belgrade, he participated in the attempts to defend the Serbian capital against the invading forces. Jeličić later managed to escape southwards to a unit stationed near Rudnik. During a battle for the Mačva region, he was wounded while replacing a machine gunner who had been killed earlier. In Niš, he befriended Archibald Reiss, a professor in criminology who later would become known for his documentations of Austro-Hungarian war crimes against civilians during the occupation of Serbia. Reiss wrote about the encounter in his memoirs. During the war, Jeličić was personally awarded the rank of Corporal by Prince-Regent Alexander. Shortly before the age of fourteen, he was promoted to Lance Sergeant, and he participated in the battles at the Salonika front. He was wounded six times in total during the course of the war.

After the war had ended, he worked as an actor at the theatre in Nikšić. During the Axis occupation of Yugoslavia in the Second World War, he joined the Yugoslav Partisan resistance movement. He died in Nikšić in 1963, leaving three daughters behind him.

== See also ==
- Momčilo Gavrić (1906–1993), youngest soldier of World War I (joined at the age of 8).
