= Macedonian alphabet =

Writing system of the Macedonian language

- Makedonska azbuka "Macedonian alphabet" in Macedonian language
- Script type: Alphabet
- Period: 1945 – present
- Official script: North Macedonia
- Languages: Macedonian

Related scripts
- Parent systems: Egyptian hieroglyphs: Phoenician alphabet; Greek alphabet (partly Glagolitic alphabet); Early Cyrillic alphabet; Macedonian alphabet

ISO 15924
- ISO 15924: Cyrl (220), Cyrillic

Unicode
- Unicode alias: Cyrillic
- Unicode range: subset of Cyrillic (U+0400...U+04FF)
- This language reads left to right

The Macedonian alphabet (Macedonian: Македонска азбука, romanized: Makedonska azbuka) is an adaptation of the Cyrillic script used to write the Macedonian language. It consists of 31 letters.

The alphabet was standardized in 1945 by a commission formed in Yugoslav Macedonia after the Yugoslav Partisans took power at the end of World War II in Yugoslavia. The alphabet used the same phonemic principles employed by Vuk Karadžić (1787–1864) and Krste Misirkov (1874–1926).

Before standardization, the language had been written in a variety of different versions of Cyrillic by different writers, influenced by Early Cyrillic, Russian, Bulgarian and Serbian orthography.

== The alphabet ==
The following table provides the upper and lower case forms of the Macedonian alphabet, along with the IPA value for each letter:

| Letter IPA Name | А а /a/ A | Б б /b/ Be | В в /v/ Ve | Г г /ɡ/ Ge | Д д /d/ De | Ѓ ѓ /ɟ/ Gje | Е е /ɛ/ E | Ж ж /ʒ/ Zhe | З з /z/ Ze | Ѕ ѕ /d͡z/ Dze | И и /i/ I |
| Letter IPA Name | Ј ј /j/ Je | К к /k/ Ka | Л л /ɫ/, /l/ El | Љ љ /ʎ/ Lje | М м /m/ Em | Н н /n/ En | Њ њ /ɲ/ Nje | О о /ɔ/ O | П п /p/ Pe | Р р /r/ Er | С с /s/ Es |
| Letter IPA Name | Т т /t/ Te | Ќ ќ /c/ Kje | У у /u/ U | Ф ф /f/ Ef | Х х /x/ Kha | Ц ц /t͡s/ Tse | Ч ч /t͡ʃ/ Che | Џ џ /d͡ʒ/ Dzhe | Ш ш /ʃ/ Sha |

In addition to the standard sounds of the letters Ѓ and Ќ above, in some dialects these letters represent /dʑ/ and /tɕ/, respectively.

=== Cursive alphabet ===
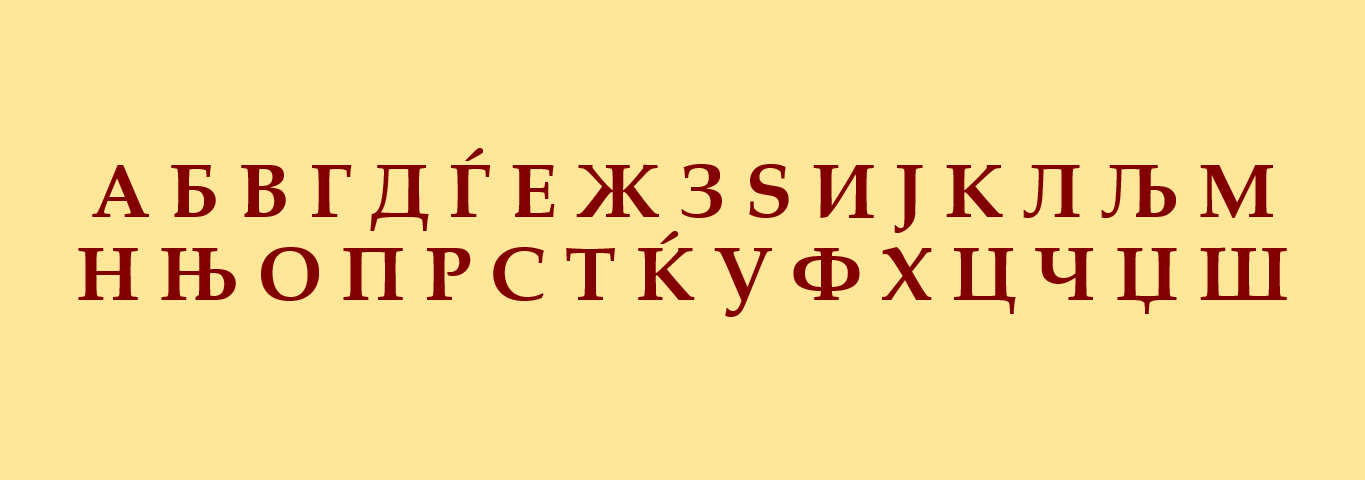
The letters of the alphabet

The word Македонија ("Macedonia") in Macedonian, written in cursive script.

The above table contains the printed form of the alphabet; the cursive script is significantly different, and is illustrated below in lower and upper case (letter order and layout below corresponds to table above).

The alphabet, rendered in a cursive script style

Alternate variants of lowercase Cyrillic letters: Б/б, Д/д, Г/г, И/и, П/п, Т/т, Ш/ш. Default Russian (Eastern) forms on the left. Alternate Bulgarian (Western) upright forms in the middle. Alternate Serbian/Macedonian (Southern) italic forms on the right. See also: and

== Specialized letters ==
Macedonian has a number of phonemes not found in neighboring languages. The committees charged with drafting the alphabet decided on the phonemic principle of Serbian Cyrillic with a one-to-one match between letters and distinctive sounds.

=== Unique letters ===
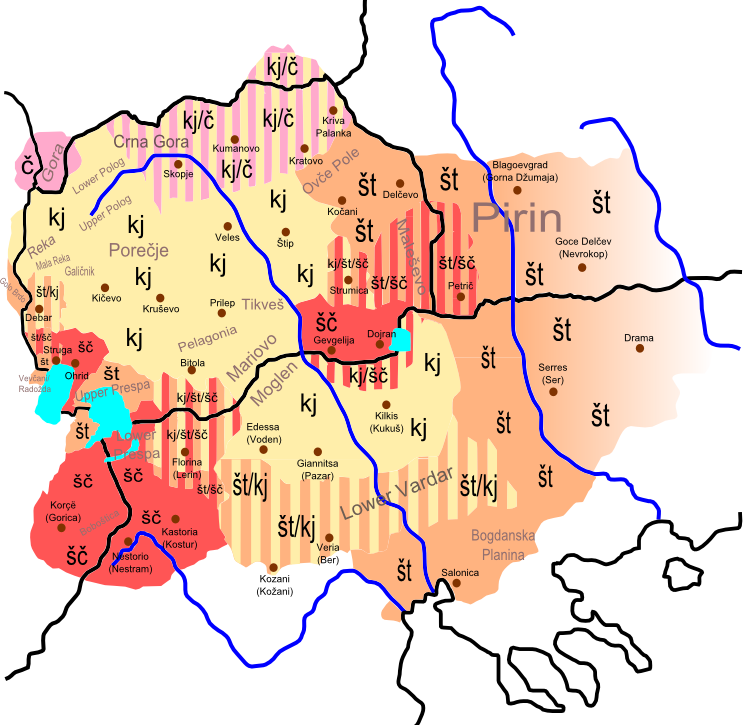
Map of the phoneme kj (Ќ) in Macedonian

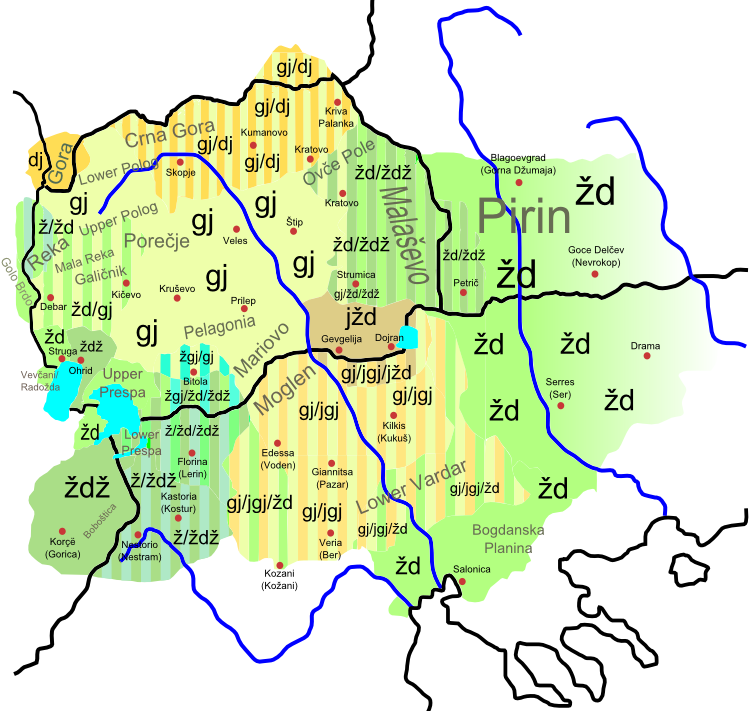
Map of the phoneme gj (Ѓ) in Macedonian

==== Ѓ and Ќ ====
In "On Macedonian Matters", Krste Misirkov used the combinations Г and К to represent the phonemes /ɟ/ and /c/, which are unique to Macedonian among South Slavic languages. In his magazine Vardar, Misirkov used the letters Ѓ and Ќ. Eventually, Ѓ and Ќ were adopted for the alphabet.

In 1887, Temko Popov of the Secret Macedonian Committee used the digraphs гј and кј in his article "Who is guilty?". The following year, the committee published the "Macedonian primer" (written by Kosta Grupče and Naum Evro) which used the Serbian letters Ђ and Ћ for these phonemes.

Marko Cepenkov, Gjorgjija Pulevski and Partenij Zografski used ГЬ and КЬ.

Despite their forms, Ѓ and Ќ are ordered not after Г and К, but after Д and Т respectively, based on phonetic similarity. This corresponds to the alphabet positions of Serbian Cyrillic Ђ and Ћ respectively. These letters often correspond to Macedonian Ѓ and Ќ in cognates (for example, Macedonian "шеќер" (šeḱer, sugar) is analogous to Serbo-Croatian "шећер/šećer"), but they are phonetically different.

==== Ѕ ====
The Cyrillic letter Dze (S s), representing the sound /d͡z/, is based on Dzělo, the eighth letter of the early Cyrillic alphabet. Although a homoglyph to the Latin letter S, the two letters are not directly related. Although Ѕ is generally transcribed as dz, it is a distinct phoneme and is not analogous to ДЗ, which is also used in Macedonian orthography for /d.z/. Ѕ is sometimes described as soft-dz. Dimitar Mirčev was most likely the first writer to use this letter in print prior to the standardization of 1944.

The letter Ѕ was used by Kiril Pejčinovikj, Marko Cepenkov, and Dimitar Mirčev prior to the standardization of 1944.

=== Letters analogous to Serbian Cyrillic ===
==== Ј ====
Prior to standardization, the IPA phoneme /j/ (represented by Ј in the modern alphabet) was represented variously as:

- Й/й (by Gjorgjija Pulevski in "Macedonian fairy");
- І/і (by Misirkov in On Macedonian Matters, Marko Cepenkov, Dimitar Mirčev, in four of Gjorgjija Pulevski's works, in the "Macedonian primer" by the Secret Macedonian Committee and by members of the Loza movement);
- Ј/ј (by Gjorgjija Pulevski in his "Dictionary of four languages" and "Dictionary of three languages", and by Temko Popov in his article "Who is guilty?"). Krste Misirkov and Dimitrija Čupovski opposed the use of j and preferred the letter iota (i) instead. Eventually the Ј was selected to represent /j/.

==== Љ and Њ ====
The letters Љ and Њ (/ʎ/ and /ɲ/) are from the Serbian Cyrillic alphabet. Historically, Macedonian writers have also used:

- The digraphs ЛЬ and НЬ (used by Marko Cepenkov, Gjorgjija Pulevski and in the "Macedonian primer" of the Secret Macedonian Committee)
- The digraphs ЛЈ and НЈ (used by Temko Popov)
- The combinations Л and Н (used by Krste Misirkov and Dimitar Mirčev)

==== Џ ====
The letter Џ (representing the phoneme /dʒ/) was adopted from the Serbian alphabet. It was used by Georgi Dimovich in 18th century, Kiril Pejčinovikj, Marko Cepenkov, and Gjorgjija Pulevski in four of his works, as well as by the Secret Macedonian Committee and Dimitar Mirčev. Misirkov used the digraph ДЖ.

=== Accented letters ===
The accented letters Ѐ and Ѝ are not regarded as separate letters, nor are they accented to signify a different pronunciation (as in French, for example). Rather, they are the standard letters Е and И topped with an accent when they stand in words that have homographs, so as to differentiate between them (for example, "сѐ се фаќа" – sè se faḱa, "everything is touchable"; "и ѝ рече" – i ì reče, "and he/she told her").

== History ==
The decline of the Ottoman Empire from the mid-19th century coincided with Slavic resistance to the use of Greek in Orthodox churches and schools. The Macedonian Slavs referred to their language as Bulgarian. There was a disagreement between Macedonian Slavs and Bulgarian Slavs for the basis of standard Bulgarian. At the end of 1879, Despot Badžović published the Alphabet Book for Serbo-Macedonian Primary Schools (Serbian: Буквар за србо-македонске основне школе, Bukvar za srbo-makedonske osnovne škole) written in "Serbo-Macedonian dialect".

From the Balkan Wars of 1912/1913, and until the end of the Second World War, Vardar Macedonia (modern North Macedonia) was part of Serbia (later the Kingdom of Yugoslavia) and occasionally of Bulgaria, and standard Serbian and Bulgarian were imposed as the official languages. The Serbian and Bulgarian authorities considered Macedonian to be a dialect of Serbian or Bulgarian respectively. Some books in Macedonian dialects were published in Bulgaria, while some texts in Macedonian dialect were published in Yugoslavia in the 1920s and 1930s as well.

=== Standardization ===
In a meeting of the Central Committee of the Communist Party of Macedonia (CPM) from 2 to 4 August 1943, it was decided to establish an Initiative Committee for the convocation of the Antifascist Assembly of the National Liberation of Macedonia (ASNOM), and that this committee should "form an expert group to work on the creation of a Macedonian literary language and a Macedonian alphabet." ASNOM made the Macedonian language official on 2 August 1944. In 1944, Blaže Koneski participated in the first attempts to codify the alphabet, initiated by the Macedonian Partisans in the village Gorno Vranovci. After the first session of ASNOM, the ASNOM delegates and the General Staff of the Macedonian Partisans relocated to the village Ramno, in the Kumanovo region. There, the Commissioner for Education, Epaminonda Popandonov, established a commission to create a provisional alphabet, consisting of Kiril Petrušev, Emanuel Čučkov, Lazo Sokol, Blagoj Hadzipanzov, Asen Simitčiev, Bogoja Fotev, Panko Brašnarov, Petre Piruze, Aco Petrovski, and Aco Garevski. The president of ASNOM's Presidium, Metodija Andonov-Čento, and the Commissioner for Education, Epaminonda Popandonov, also participated in the commission's work. In a meeting in 30 September, the provisional alphabet with 25 letters was proposed. After the capture of Skopje in November 1944, the Presidium of ASNOM met there and appointed the Commission for the Establishment of the Macedonian Language, Alphabet and Orthography to prepare a proposal about the alphabet and orthography of the Macedonian language.

==== First Commission ====
The first commission's meeting, November 1944. From left to right: Vasil Iljoski, Hristo Zografov, Krum Tošev, Dare Džambaz, Venko Markovski, Mirko Pavlovski, Mihail Petruševski, Risto Prodanov, Gjorgji Kiselinov, Georgi Šoptrajanov, Jovan Kostovski.

The first commission held discussions from 27 November to 4 December 1944, and was composed of Macedonian academics, intellectuals and writers. Apart from Koneski, most of the other members of the commission were not professional linguists. Milka Balvanlieva-Đorđević and Venko Markovski recommended that everyone in Vardar Macedonia should be permitted to write "the way he wants". Gjorgji Kiselinov told the other participants to speed up the work "because we don't have time to wait until one of our dialects develops into a literary language." Milka Balvanlieva and Blaže Koneski suggested the adoption of Serbian Cyrillic. Per Victor Friedman, Koneski did so for linguistic and pedagogical reasons. However, most participants advocated for the creation of a distinct Macedonian alphabet. Koneski argued that most Macedonians were educated with Serbian Cyrillic and insisted that any other choice would make them illiterate. He suggested the Serbian palatal equivalents (ћ and ђ), but the other participants regarded them as "too Serbian." The letter ъ divided Markovski and Koneski, as the former supported it and the latter opposed it. While some Macedonian dialects contain a clear phonemic schwa and used a Bulgarian-style Ъ, according to Friedman and Koneski (being supported by other members of the commission such as Krum Tošev), the western dialects – on which the literary language is based – do not. Koneski objected to the inclusion of the Big Yer on the basis that since there was no Big Yer in the literary language (not yet standardized), there was no need for it to be represented in the alphabet and that by excluding it from the alphabet, speakers of schwa-dialects would more rapidly adapt to the standard dialect. On the other hand, Bulgarian opponents of Koneski indicated that this phoneme is distributed among the western Macedonian dialects too and a letter Ъ should be included in the literary language.

In his memoirs about the commission, Markovski depicted the conflict between him and Koneski as a national one, regarding Koneski among the people with pro-Serbian views, "dubious past" who were "not specialists". Due to his project on the alphabet and grammar not addressed by the commission, mostly because of Koneski, Gjorgji Kiselinov also said that he was marginalized by Koneski as his family was pro-Bulgarian, while Koneski's was pro-Serbian. However, the transcript of the debates does not support the national dimension as Markovski familiarized the other participants with Misirkov. Koneski was only present in the first day because he did not see the realization of productive results and the lack of young people in the commission.

The committee chose the dialects of Veles, Prilep and Bitola (referred to as "central" by the participants") as the basis for the literary language (as Misirkov had in 1903), and proposed a Cyrillic alphabet. Per academic Alexis Heraclides, these dialects were chosen because they were widely used and understood by most Macedonians and distant from both Serbo-Croatian and Bulgarian. The first version of the alphabet was announced on 28 December 1944. The first commission's recommendations for the alphabet were the following:

- The Serbian Ј and Џ;
- The Early Cyrillic Ѕ;
- The Early Cyrillic Ъ (schwa)
- Markovski's versions of Љ, Њ, Ќ and Ѓ (which contained a small circle in the bottom-right of Л, Н and К, and a small circle in the top-right of Г).

The commission's recommendations were rejected by ASNOM. Per Friedman, there were two contradictory reasons for the rejection of the commission's work. One was because some political authorities, such as Strahil Gigov, who wanted to involve Russian linguists in the codification, while the other reason was the assessment of the commission's work as inconsistent and insufficiently independent. This latter reason was supported by Koneski.

==== Second Commission ====
The second language commission was established on 15 January 1945. The commission worked in March 1945. It included Vojislav Ilić, Vasil Iljoski, Blaže Koneski, Venko Markovski, Mirko Pavlovski and Krum Tošev. The entire agitprop section of the Central Committee of CPM was engaged to work with the members of the commission. Per revisionist historian Stojan Kiselinovski, Radovan Zogović and Milovan Djilas from Belgrade intervened in the commission's work. Serbian Cyrillic was accepted, along with early Cyrillic Ѕ. According to revisionist historian Stojan Risteski, Zogović was responsible for this decision. Gustav Vlahov accused Zogović of imposing his will regarding the adoption of Serbian Cyrillic.

==== Third Commission and adoption ====
Official government decree enacting the Macedonian alphabet in the Socialist Republic of Macedonia, 16 May 1945. Note the hand-written Ѕ, Ј and Џ in the typewritten line, and the hand-written diacritics added to create Ѓ and Ќ.

With the rejection of the proposals of the previous commissions by Lazar Koliševski and his colleagues, a new commission was convened. It included Vasil Iljoski, Blaže Koneski, Venko Markovski, Mirko Pavlovski, Krum Tošev, Kiro Hadživasilev, Vlado Maleski, Ilija Topalovski, Gustav Vlahov and Ivan Mazov. In April 1945, the agitprop section of the Central Committee of the Communist Party of Yugoslavia invited Blaže Koneski, Venko Markovski, and Veselinka Malinska to Belgrade for a conversation about the orthography. Per the memoirs of Djilas, Koneski's proposals were accepted. On 3 May 1945, the commission reached an agreement, with the proposal about the alphabet being signed by all participants, and presented its recommendations.

The commission's recommendations were:

- Acceptance of Serbian Ј and Џ;
- Acceptance of Early Cyrillic Ѕ;
- Adoption of Serbian Љ and Њ, which were similar in appearance to Markovski's proposed letters;
- Creation and adoption of Ќ and Ѓ (over Markovski's proposed letter forms); and
- Rejection of Early Cyrillic Ъ (Big Yer).

The Macedonian Ministry of Education accepted the proposal on the same day. On 5 May, the decision about the alphabet was adopted by the government of Democratic Federal Macedonia, which was published in Nova Makedonija. The official adoption of an orthography was realized on 7 June 1945. The governmental decision on the orthography was published in a brochure titled Macedonian Orthography and implemented in the first textbook, Dictionary with Reading Materials for the First Grade. Venko Markovski, Vasil Ivanovski, Pavel Šatev and Panko Brašnarov considered the alphabet as too "Serbified". Due to the absence of a letter for schwa in Macedonian, the apostrophe is used instead.

According to scholar of language politics Tomasz Kamusella, the alphabet is a slightly modified form of Serbian Cyrillic as it uses its graphemes j, љ, њ, џ, while the Macedonian diacritical letters ѓ and ќ were introduced to replace the Serbo-Croatian ђ and ћ. Per linguists Victor Friedman and Brian Joseph, the alphabet was modelled after Serbian Cyrillic.

=== Commission members ===
| First Committee | Second Committee | Third Committee |
m denotes military appointee c denotes civilian appointee * denotes member who served in more than one committee
| Epaminonda Popandonov (m) | Blaže Koneski* | Venko Markovski* |
| Jovan Kostovski (c) | Venko Markovski* | Vasil Iljoski* |
| Milka Balvanlieva (m) | Dare Džambaz* | Mirko Pavlovski* |
| Dare Džambaz* (m) | Veselinka Malinska | Blaže Koneski* |
| Vasil Iljoski* (c) | Liljana Čalovska | Krum Tošev* |
| Georgi Kiselinov (c) | Vlado Maleski* | Ivan Mazov* |
| Blaže Koneski* (m) | Kiro Hadživasilev* | Gustav Vlahov |
| Venko Markovski* (m) | Dimitar Vlahov | Vlado Maleski* |
| Mirko Pavlovski* (c) | Dimče Mireski | Kiro Hadživasilev* |
| Mihail Petruševski (c) | Boro Miljoski | Ilija Topalovski |
| Risto Prodanov (m) | Ivan Mazov* | |
| Georgi Šoptrajanov* (m) | Lazar V. Kostov | |
| Krum Tošev* (m) | Vojislav Ilić | |
| Hristo Zografov (c) | Georgi Šoptrajanov* | |
Sources: Victor A. Friedman and Stojan Kiselinovski

== Keyboard layout ==
The standard Macedonian keyboard layout for personal computers is as follows:

== See also ==
- Cyrillic alphabets
- Romanization of Macedonian
- Macedonian braille
- Scientific transliteration of Cyrillic
- Political views on the Macedonian language
