= Theodosius of Skopje =

Bulgarian religious figure

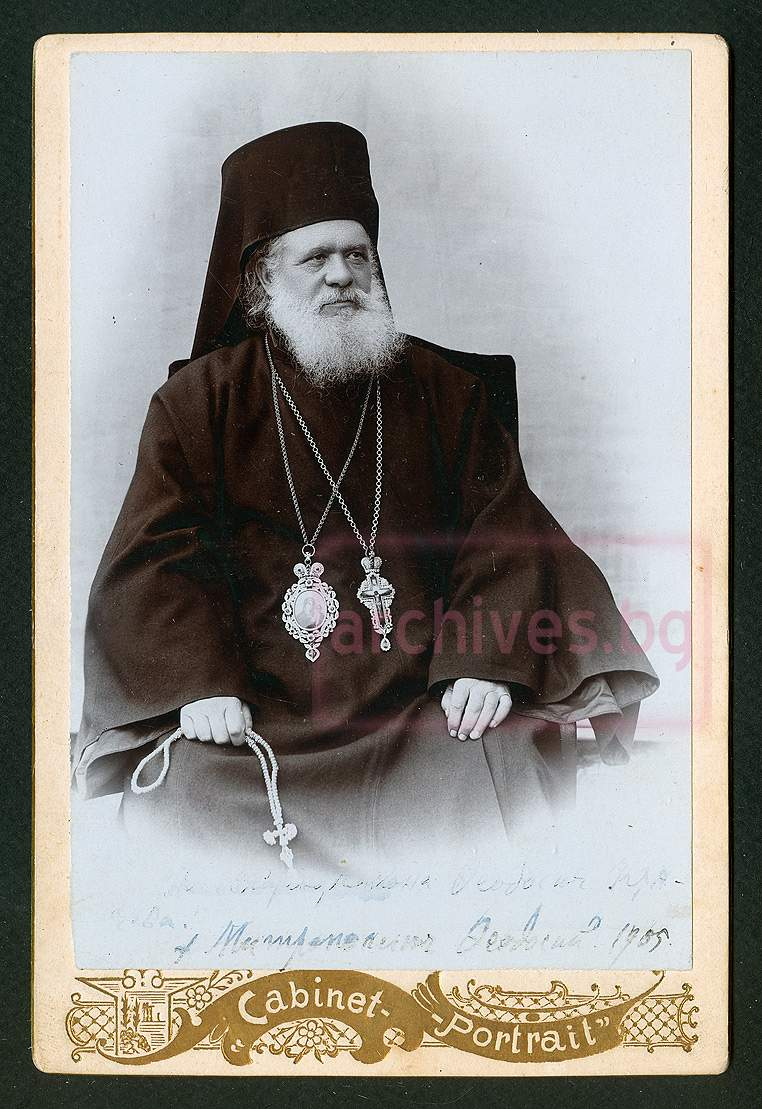
- Born: Васил Илиев Гологанов (Vasil Iliev Gologanov); 7 January 1846; Vathytopos, Ottoman Empire
- Died: 1 February 1926 (aged 80); Sofia, Kingdom of Bulgaria

Theodosius of Skopje (Bulgarian: Теодосий Скопски, Macedonian: Теодосиј(а) Скопски; 1846–1926) was a Bulgarian religious figure, scholar and translator of the Bulgarian language from Macedonia. He was initially involved in the struggle for an autonomous Bulgarian Church and later in his life, he became a member of the Bulgarian Academy of Sciences. Although he was named Metropolitan Bishop of the Bulgarian Exarchate in Skopje, he is known for his failed attempt to establish a separate Macedonian Church as a restoration of the Archbishopric of Ohrid.

== Life ==
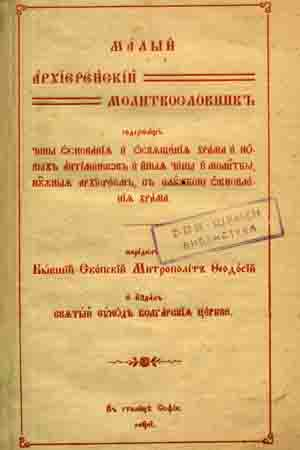
Small bishop's preaching book. A Collection by the Metropolitan of Skopje Theodosius. Sofia. Synod of the Bulgarian Church, 1911.

Theodosius of Skopje was born as Vasil Iliev Gologanov (Bulgarian and Macedonian: Васил Илиев Гологанов) on 7 January 1846 in the then Slavic-populated village of Tarlis (now part of Kato Nevrokopi municipality, Greece) in the Ottoman Empire. Theodosius was the son of the Reverend Iliya Ivanov Gologanov. His brother Ivan Gologanov was a Bulgarian teacher who forged the book Veda Slovena. Theodosius studied in the classical Greek gymnasium in Serres. In 1862, he became a monk under the name of Theodosius in the monastery of Saint John Prodromus near Serres, and later was ordained as a hierodeacon from the Greek Patriarch of Constantinople. Sometime in 1867, he left for Hercegovina, where he worked as a protosingel of Metropolitan Prokopius. After he came back to Bulgarian-inhabited lands in 1868, Theodosius became a priest in Plovdiv and then in Krichim. In Plovdiv (1867 – 1878), he contacted famous Bulgarian National Revival activists such as Yoakim Gruev, Nayden Gerov and Dragan Manchov. When the Bulgarian Exarchate was established in 1870, he joined it. While in the Krichim Monastery (1869 – 1873), he hid the founder of the Internal Revolutionary Organization, Vasil Levski, at the monastery.

From 1873, he headed the Bulgarian church community in Serres but under pressure from the Patriarchate of Constantinople, he was arrested by the Ottomans, tortured and received threats to his life, In 1874, he was imprisoned in Sеrres by the Ottoman authorities on charges of his involvement in the Bulgarian revolutionary movement in the Plovdiv region. Later Theodosius was released with the assistance of the Greek Metropolitan, and due to the strong pressure to be set free, he renounced the Exarchate. However, in the same year, after the Christian population of the bishoprics of Skopje and Ohrid voted overwhelmingly in favour of joining the Exarchate, Theodosius repentеd and the Bulgarian Holy Synod restored him to communion. Between 1874 and 1875, Theodosius was the head of the local Bulgarian Orthodox Church organization in the region of Serres. He was ordained as an archmandrite in 1875 and became an assistant of the Metropolitan of Nish, who at the time was under the jurisdiction of the Bulgarian Exarch. In 1876-1877 he was in Istanbul again and served in the Bulgarian St. Stephen Church. Between 1878 and 1880, Theodosius performed the duties of Exarch Joseph I there, since the exarch was stuck in Plovdiv after the start of the Russo-Turkish War.

Afterwards, Theodosius continued to hold high-ranking positions within the Exarchate. From 1880 to 1885 he was a representative of the Exarchate at the Sublime Porte, and in 1885 he was chosen as a bishop of the episcopacy of Skopje. However, under the pressure of the Ecumenical Patriarch of Constantinople, the Sultan issued an official ordinance only in 1890 and he had to wait five years to take office. Meanwhile, he met with Kosta Grupchev and Naum Evrov, representatives of the so-called Association of Serbo-Macedonians and agents of the Serbian diplomat in Constantinople Stojan Novaković. The Serbian government then supported the Macedonist ideas to counteract the Bulgarian influence in Macedonia, incl. the restoration of the Archbishopric of Ohrid under the jurisdiction of the Ecumenical Patriarchate. As a result of these meetings, Theodosius came under their influence. As a bishop of Skopje (1890-1891), Theodosius renounced the Bulgarian Exarchate de facto again and attempted to restore the Archbishopric of Ohrid and to separate it from the Exarchate. His plan was to create a separate Macedonian church. He contacted the Patriarchate of Constantinople, attempting to convince its leadership to accept and promote the revival of the Ohrid Archbishopric under its patriarchate but as an autonomous church, but failed. Meanwhile, the Exarchate initiated proceedings for his dismissal. Afterwards, he contacted the Vatican representative Augusto Bonetti with the plan to establish a Greek Catholic (Uniate) archbishopric in Ohrid, but failed too. Greek propagandists favourably regarded his activity. He then contacted the Serbian consul in Skopje and sought his support. After the consul informed Novaković, the latter instructed him to try bringing Theodosius into the fold of the Serbian Patriarchate, but the bishop rejected this offer. In this period, he thought that there was an ethnic difference between Macedonians and their Orthodox Christian neighbors.

At the insistence of the Exarchate at the end of 1891, he was extradited by the Ottomans to Constantinople. Despite his repentance, the Exarchate fired him from his high position in 1892 because of his separatism. He was overthrown by the Exarchate and exiled to the Dragalevtsi Monastery near Sofia. There he spent the period from 1892 to 1901, when he was engaged in translations of fiction and religious literature into Bulgarian and as before demonstrated a pro-Bulgarian position on the Macedonian Question.

As a result, he was rehabilitated and between 1901 and 1906 served as bishop of the Plovdiv eparchy, and then in the Bachkovo Monastery and in the Rila monastery. In 1910, he tried again to run for Metropolitan of Skopje, whose position was then vacant, but he was refused, despite the pro-Exarchate positions he demonstrated in the press. During 1913, he participated on the Christianization of the Pomaks in the Rhodopes, a mission held by the Bulgarian Exarchate and IMORO. Completely repenting his Catholic aspirations, he wrote the pamphlet The Orthodox Church and Catholic Propaganda, which the Synod printed and used in the struggle against the Uniate movement in 1914. During this period he served in Sofia, where in November 1915, when the Bulgarian army defeated Serbian troops in Macedonia, he performed a solemn prayer on the occasion of the Victory Day. Theodosius also led the short-lived eparchy of Gyumyurdzhina (Komotini) between 1915 and 1919, when the area was part of Bulgaria. He spent the last years of his life in Sofia in literary activity - writing books and translations of foreign literature.

Theodosius was a member of the Bulgarian Academy of Sciences from 1910. He wrote articles on religion and translated some of the works of Virgil, François-René de Chateaubriand, John Milton and others into Bulgarian. In one of his articles, published in the newspaper "Mir", he wrote that the forefather of the Bulgarian National Revival, Paisius of Hilendar had been born in Bansko, Pirin Macedonia, contributing significantly to the construction of the image of Macedonia as a cradle of the Bulgarian National Revival. He died on 1 February 1926 in Sofia.

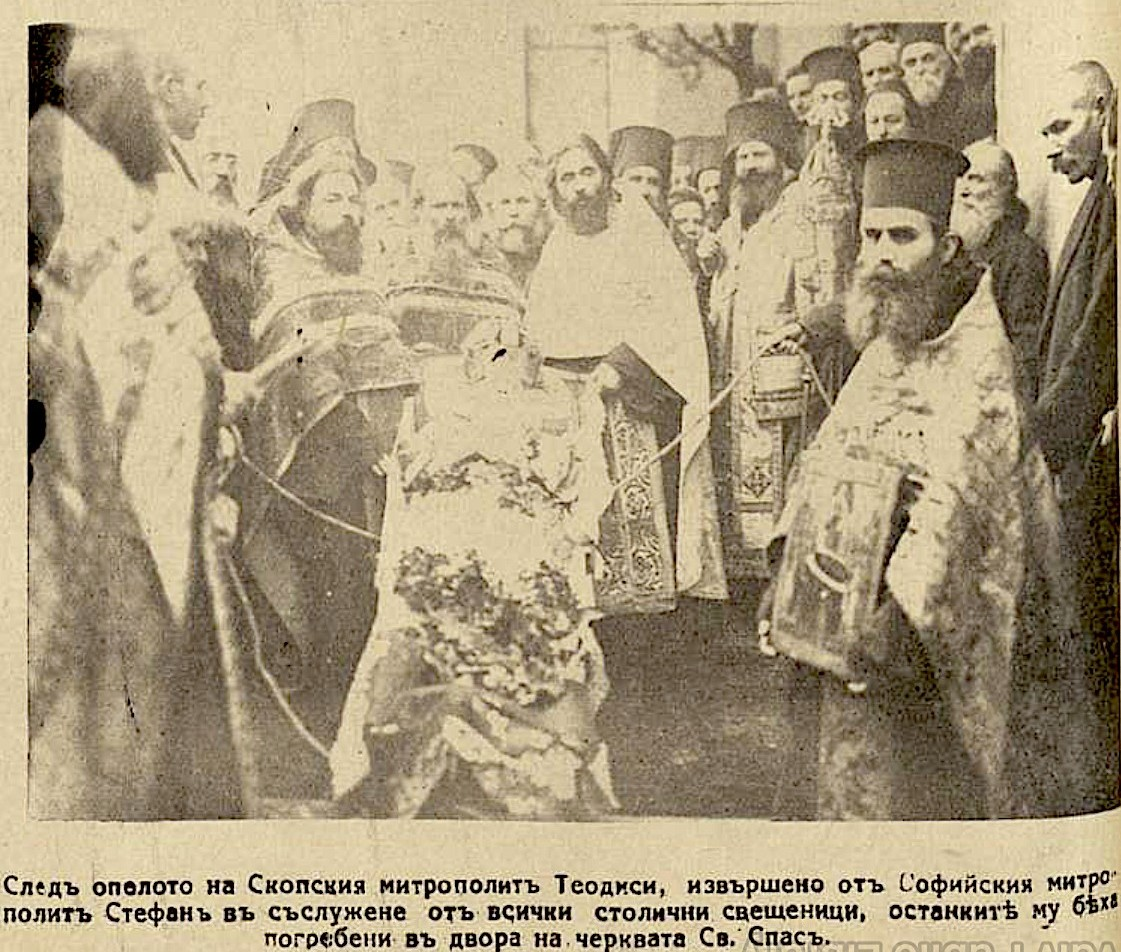
The funeral of Theodosius in 1926.

== Legacy ==
It is unknown when and how he got the idea to renew the Archbishopric of Ohrid. Per Bulgarian historians, Theodosius' separatism stemmed from his personal hatred of Exarch Joseph I. Petko Slaveykov, including his critics, believed his Macedonism was inspired by Greek propaganda. Macedonian historian Slavko Dimevski considered the religious separatism of Theodosius a form of early Macedonian nationalism. However, Dimevski has been accused by Bulgarian historians to have created a lot of deceptions, misquotations and historical misinterpretations, including in this case. Theodosius is considered a Bulgarian in Bulgaria and an ethnic Macedonian in North Macedonia.
