= Despot Badžović =

Serbian activist (1850–1930)

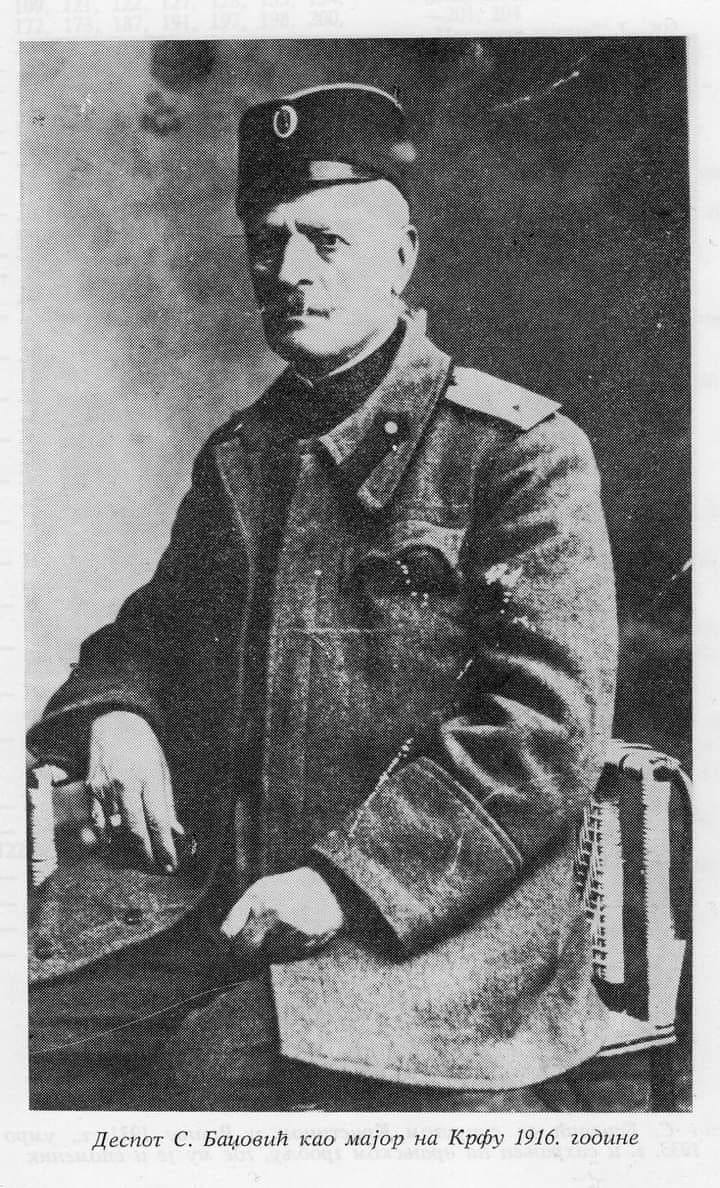
- Badžović photographed during the Serbian army's Great Retreat and evacuation in Corfu (1916).
- Born: 1850; Papradište, Monastir Vilayet, Ottoman Empire
- Died: 1 December 1932 (aged 81–82); Vladičin Han, Vardar Banovina, Kingdom of Yugoslavia
- Citizenship: Serbian, Yugoslav
- Education: theology at Belgrade Orthodox seminary, history and philosophy at Belgrade Great School
- Occupations: educator, military, scribe, local official
- Employer: Ministry of Finance (1878–1888, 1892–)
- Organization(s): Board for Old Serbia and Macedonia
- Political party: Liberal Party
- Children: Two
- Relatives: brothers Đorđe and Kuzman
- Awards: Order of the Cross of Takovo

Despot Badžović (Serbian: Деспот Баџовић; 1850–1930) was a Serbian educator and activist of the Serbian national movement in Ottoman Kosovo and Macedonia. He distinguished himself as a commander of volunteer corps in the Serbian–Ottoman Wars (1876–1878). He worked in associations and organizations that sought for the liberation and unification of Kosovo and Macedonia with Serbia. After the wars he served as a scribe and local official in towns in southern Serbia. He also participated in the Balkan Wars and First World War for which he received honours. Badžović was also a pioneer of Macedonism as a tool of promoting Serbian consciousness.

== Early life ==
Badžović was born in Papradište in the Ottoman Empire (now North Macedonia), to a Mijak family that hailed from Mogorče in the Reka region, having moved at the turn of the 17th to 18th century. He had two brothers, younger Đorđe (Đoka) and older Kuzman. He espoused a Serb identity.

In mid-1867 he moved to Belgrade. Despot Badžović and his brother Đorđe graduated at the second department of the Orthodox seminary founded by Miloš Milojević (1840–1897) in Belgrade. In 1871 Badžović opened a Serbian school in Kruševo for about 60 students where he and his brother Đorđe were the first teachers. He was negatively pressured by Bulgarian Exarchate metropolitan Natanail of Ohrid and other pro-Bulgarian intrigue upon opening the school. At the end of 1874 he worked in Bitola as a teacher. Đorđe left the Kruševo school in 1875 to become a teacher in Smilevo, while their brother Kuzman and his wife, Jelena Badžović, replaced them as teachers in Kruševo. In September 1875 he was in Belgrade, after being asked to move there by M. Milojević in August, and with the outbreak of the Herzegovina uprising (1875–1877) he was unable to return to Bitola as the borders were closed. On 28 October 1875 he asked the Ministry of Education to be employed in Serbia, but no place was found and he instead entered the Historical-Philosophical faculty of the Great School. He received a stipendium after an application made on 26 March 1876, supported by educator Miloš Milojević.

== Career ==
With the outbreak of the First Serbian-Ottoman War in June 1876, Badžović joined the Raška-Ibar volunteer detachment (Рашко-ибарска дружина) where he was given the lieutenant rank (poručnik) due to "excellent conduct, prudence, virtue, patriotism, indomitability and courage", as mentioned by volunteer commander M. Milojević in his letter to the Ministry of Education dated 17 March 1877. The Board for Serb Schools and Teachers in Old Serbia and Macedonia financially assisted Badžović through the Ministry of Foreign Affairs during the war. The Raška-Ibar units were commanded by Milojević (who also commanded other units) and he was some times represented by teacher Milojko Veselinović (1850–1913) in battle. Among those active in the Serbian–Ottoman Wars (1876–1878) with mobilizing volunteers who illegally crossed the Ottoman–Serbian border to join Serbian forces were especially Todor Stanković (1852–1925), Miloš Milojević, archimandrite Sava Dečanac (1831–1913), Aksentije Hadži Arsić, Despot Badžović, Kosta Šumenković (1828–1905), Gligorije Čemerikić, and others. Badžović was present as a soldier and commander of volunteers and guerrillas in the frontier, active for two years and eight months.

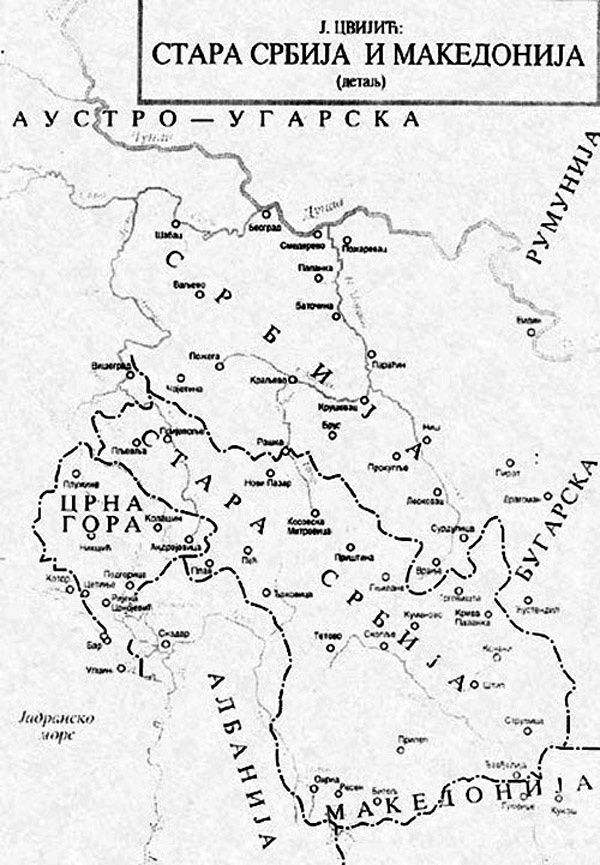
Old Serbia and Macedonia, part of the Ottoman Empire, in a map by geographer Jovan Cvijić.

A secret committee named "Board for Old Serbia and Macedonia" (Одбор за Стару Србију и Македонију) was established in the beginning of 1877, with initiatives for liberation of Macedonia and solving the Macedonian question. Members included Kosta Šumenković from Struga, Todor Stanković from Niš, professor Miloš Milojević, archimandrite Sava Dečanac, Aksentije Hadži Arsić, Despot Badžović and his brother Kuzman Badžović, Gligorije Čemerikić and others. They also informed representatives of the Great Powers and the Russian Empire of their demands. Badžović was in the delegation of "Serbs of Old Serbia" that petitioned the Serbian government on 2 and 20 May 1877 for the liberation and unification of Old Serbia with the Principality of Serbia. On 7 May 1877 Badžović asked for financial aid from the Ministry of Internal Affairs as he, "a teacher ... constantly on the border, fighting against our Asiatic enemy ... was left without any expenses and have no other help ... ", until "the return to my teaching position later". This was approved two days later by Minister of Internal Affairs Jovan Ristić. Badžović worked on organizing volunteer bands of immigrants from Old Serbia [and Macedonia], that would cross into the Ottoman Empire and rise up the people. As "representatives of Old Serbia", Sava, Arsić, Stanković and Badžović asked for financial support in their work, in a letter dated 7 June 1877 to Jevrem Grujić, a representative of the Ministry of Internal Affairs. They received financial aid on 15 June, 4 and 24 August 1877. On 10 July 1877, with the crossing of Russian troops at the Danube, the Board feared for Bulgarian propaganda in Old Serbia and wrote a letter, one of many, to the Ministry of Internal Affairs. On 8 May 1878 he sent a treatise on the ethnic belonging of Slavs of northern Albania and Macedonia to the Minister Jovan Ristić, including a linguistic study and local epic poetry, which was then published in part in the Serbian-language magazine Zastava on 10 May 1878. On 25 May 1878, the Board asked that Sava represent Old Serbia in the international talks of the Congress of Berlin.

As Badžović was unable to return to Kruševo, he was employed in the Ministry of Finance as a scribe of the Pčinja srez (serving until 1881). On 13 August [O.S. 1 August] 1878 he suggested to the Ministry of Internal Affairs to establish an Old-Serbian Board (Старо–Српски Одбор) made up of people from newly liberated and unliberated Serb territories; a foundation in Belgrade that would pay for the Serb educational municipalities in unliberated areas; new textbooks in line with Ottoman censorship be published; work for establishing a Patriarchate of Exarchate for Serbs in the Ottoman Empire; establish a publishing house Skopje or elsewhere for Serb textbooks, other books and at least one magazine; establish book stores in Skopje, Prizren and Bitola at the expense of the state publishing house; that members of the Board working as educators in Ottoman territory be given status as Serbian officials; that workers from Ottoman territory working in Serbia give a sum of their yearly pay to the foundation and that the Board work for increasing revenue of the foundation with voluntary contributions.

Despot Badžović and his brother Kuzman were very active in the Kresna–Razlog uprising (October 1878–May 1879), collecting financial contributions. As the Pčinja scribe, he had constant ties with the insurgents. On 5 April 1879 Matija Ban warned Minister Ristić about aspirations and agitation from Bulgaria, Greece and Austria-Hungary in Macedonia, and suggested that a Board for Macedonia be established in Belgrade, with members Đorđe Maletić, Miloš Milojević, archpriest Jakov Pavlović, Đorđe Popović, Matija Ban, and for the Boards outside Belgrade he suggested Dimitrije Aleksijević in Niš, and archimandrite Sava Dečanac and Despot Badžović in Vranje. It was also suggested that "Serb-Macedonian" textbooks be stamped, and that a publishing house be established in Vranje with a magazine for the Serbs in Turkey, respecting Ottoman censorship. On 20 May 1879 Despot Badžović suggested to the Ministry of Foreign Affairs to send Serb guerrilla bands into Macedonia and rise up the people. Jovan Ristić explicitly prohibited the organization of chetas sent into Old Serbia and Macedonia from Serbia, as to not risk Serbian–Ottoman relations nor the reopening of the Eastern Question and Greater Bulgaria; he furthermore was in talks with the Ecumenical Patriarchate regarding appointment of Serbian-speaking bishops in former Peć Patriarchate territory. On 30 November 1879 Badžović again asked Minister Ristić to establish the Old-Serbian Board, as the time was favorable with the absence of Exarchist bishops, the "pillars of Bulgarian propaganda", still not allowed by the Porte to return to Old Serbia and Macedonia; he noted that Bulgarian agitation was still spread by Bulgarian teachers and books.

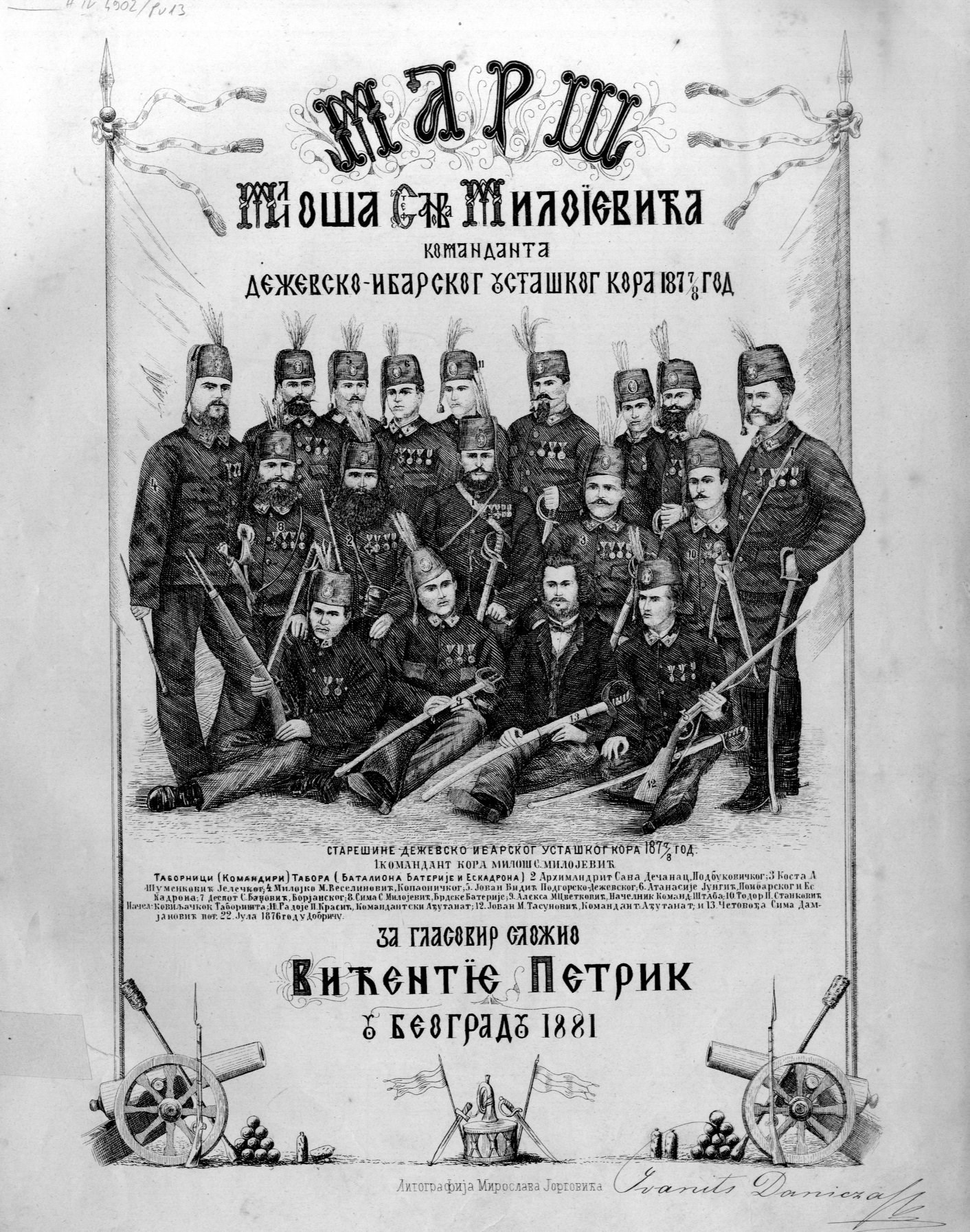
March for Miloš S. Milojević (1881), where Badžović and his comrades in the Deževo-Ibar corps are illustrated based on a 1876 photograph.

In 1881, Czech-born compositor Vićentije Petrik composed the March for Miloš S. Milojević; the illustration made by Miroslav Jorgović on the front page depicts commander of Deževo-Ibar corps Miloš Milojević and his commanders archimandrite Sava Dečanac of the Podbukovica corps, Kosta Šumenković of the Jeleč corps, Milojko Veselinović of the Kopaonik corps, Jovan Bidić of the Podgora-Deževo corps, Atanasije Jungić of the Poibarje corps, Despot Badžović of the Borjan corps, Sima S. Milojević of the Brda battery, chief of staff Aleksa M. Cvetković, Todor Stanković of the Koviljača camps, commander-adjutant Radoje Krasić, commander-adjutant Jovan Tasunović and cheta-leader Sima Damjanović. The lithograph was most likely done after a photograph dated 22 July 1876 in Dobrič.

Badžović was a member of the Society for the Promotion of Serbian Literature, that became the Liberal Party in 1882. In 1882 he was transferred to Pirot and in 1886 to the Poljanica srez headquartered in Golemo Selo.

On 23 February 1885 a meeting (zbor) of the "Serb-Macedonians and Old-Serbs" was held in Belgrade, presided by Despot Badžović, which urged Prime Minister M. Garašanin to begin the Serbian national programme in Macedonia which would protect Serbian national interest. More meetings were held in Niš (3 March), Belgrade and Vranje which improved the government's viewpoint on the matter. In 1889 Despot Badžović suggested that the Namesništvo (regency) gather volunteers to send into Macedonia, but the government disagreed.

Due to his Liberalist membership, he and others came under attack during the change in politics and was by late 1888 dismissed from his scribe post. He was reactivated in 1892 and appointed the treasurer of the Salt enterprise in Veliko Gradište, but went into pension in May 1893. He moved to Vranje. On 19 December 1892 he advertised his brochure The Macedonian Question: Proposal for an agreement between the Serbs, Greeks and Bulgarians on alliance of the Balkan peoples. His petition to receive further pension due to his military service and educational work was denied by the Ministry of Education on 6 July 1893.

Badžović received the Order of the Cross of Takovo, 4th degree, on 11 April 1899. In 1903 King Alexander Obrenović asked Badžović's views on the liberation of the southward territories. Badžović lived in Vladičin Han, and served as an official in the srez. On 27 August 1905 he was designated infantry reserve captain of the 2nd class (rezervni kapetan II klase).

Badžović participated in the Balkan Wars (1912–13) and as a seventy-year-old in the First World War, serving as a commander of the Third Call (III. poziv). He and his men participated in the Great Retreat and survived the Albanian Golgotha, arriving at Corfu (1916). In 1918 he returned to Serbia. He lost his two sons (one was captain Svetislav) and brother Kuzman (interred in Bulgaria) in the war. He was awarded the Order of the Cross of Takovo, 3rd degree, the Golden and Silver Medals for Courage and other medals. He died on 1 December 1932 in Vladičin Han.

Badžović was a contributor to the magazines Srpske Novine, Istok, Maćedonija, Srpska zastava, and others.

== Notable works ==
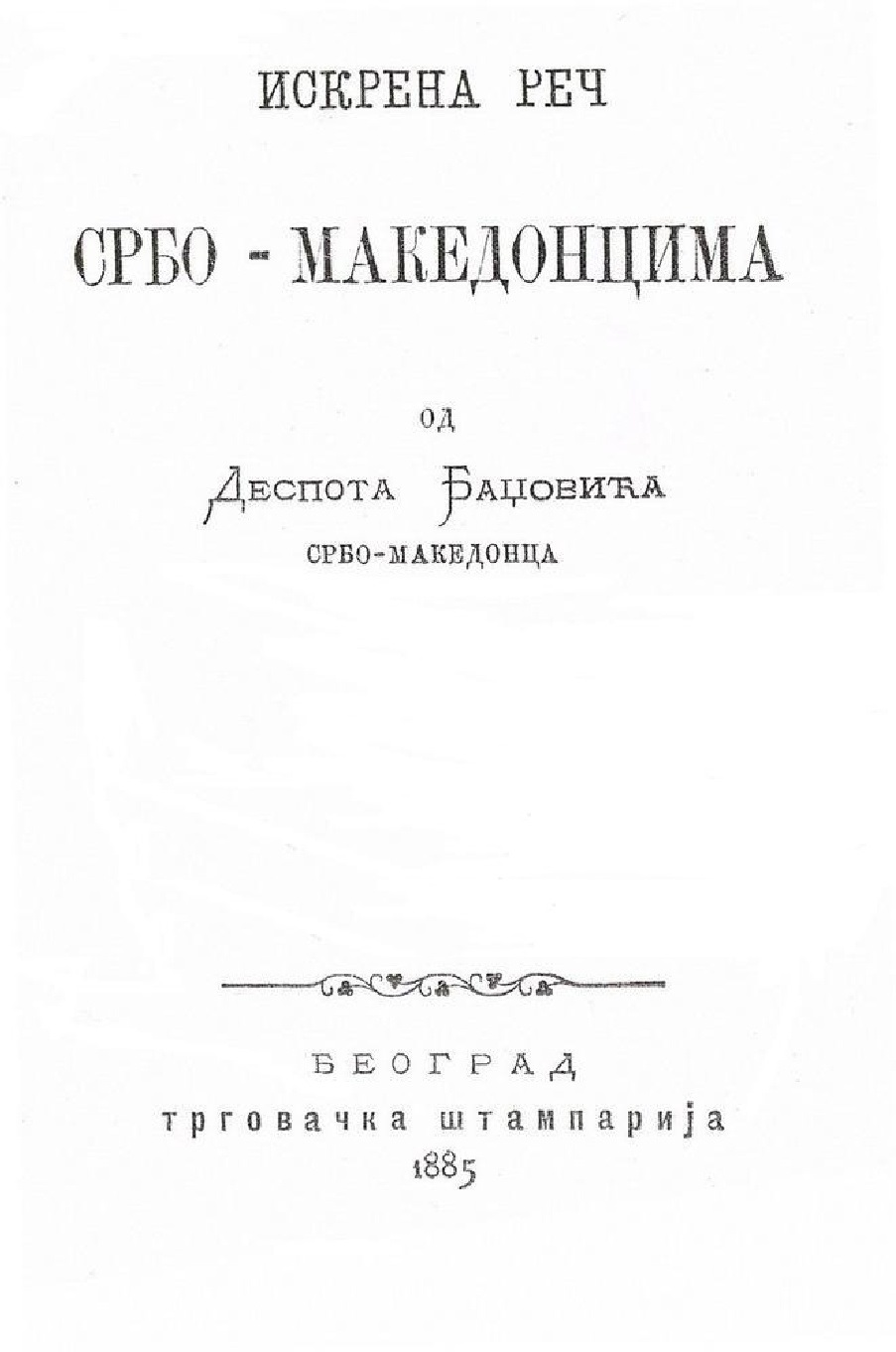
Honest Word of Serb-Macedonians (1885).

At the end of 1879, with approval of Matija Ban, Badžović authored the Alphabet Textbook for Serbo-Macedonian Primary Schools (Serbian: Буквар за србо-македонске основне школе) written in the "Serbo-Macedonian dialect". According to Tchavdar Marinov, Badžović developed a kind of pro-Serbian Slav Macedonian identity after his move to Serbia. Per Kosta Tsarnushanov, at that time the idea of using Macedonism as a means of gradual Serbianisation of Macedonian Slavs began to be promoted, for which Badžović himself advocated, due to the strong Bulgarian activity in the area. According to Stojan Novaković then the Bulgarian idea was deeply rooted in Macedonia and it was almost impossible to shake it completely by opposing it merely with the Serbian national idea. That was why the Serbian idea saw an ally in Macedonism. Matija Ban proposed to the Serbian government to establish a Main Board with eight members who would maintain connection with smaller sub-boards in places in Old Serbia and Macedonia for educational purposes.

In 1885, the Ottoman Empire allowed the Serbian government to release textbooks in Serbian schools in Ottoman territories. The textbooks were however held at the Ottoman border as the authorities mistrusted that the Serbian publishers held to Ottoman censure directives. Due to this, Stojan Novaković worked on having Serbian textbooks stamped at Constantinople, which was accepted by the Ministry of Education and work began to implement this in May 1888. Novaković sought a special Macedonian Primer (Makedonski bukvar), which would also serve in the Serbian interest of influencing the local dialects with the Serbian literary language. The primer of Stevan Čuturilo was reworked by Kosta Grupčević and Naum Evrović, but Minister of Education Vladan Đorđević wanted involvement of more people as to reach the best quality, and thus engaged Badžović as well. Badžović edited his earlier textbook and sent it to the Ministry of Education under the name Alphabet book for Macedonian Schools in Turkish Empire (Serbian: Буквар за македонски училишта у Турској Царевини). The Grupčević–Evrović and Badžović textbooks used the Brsjak–Mijak dialect (of western North Macedonia) as basis, Milojko Veselinović composed a third textbook, (bukvar za narodne škole) based on the Ovče Pole–Strumica dialect (of eastern North Macedonia), which was chosen by the Ministry of Education.

- Badžović, Despot (10 May 1878). Pavlović, Stevan (ed.). "Којој словенској грани припадају Словени у Горњој Албанији и у Македонији". Застава. XIII (73). Novi Sad: Državna štamparija: 2–3.
- Badžović, Despot (1885). Искрена реч Србо-Македонцима (PDF). Belgrade: Трговачка Штампарија.
- Badžović, Despot (1893) [1892]. Македонско питање. Предлог за споразум између Срба, Грка и Бугара о савезу балканских народа. В. Градиште, шт. Штампарија Ане М. Драшхоција.

== Annotations ==
1. He called himself a "Serb of Old Serbia" (1877–78) and a "Serb-Macedonian". In his work True Word of Serb-Macedonians (1885), he stated "we [Macedonians] are same-blooded brothers with the rest of the Serbs in Šumadija, Bosnia, Herzegovina, Montenegro, Banat, Bačka, Srem, Dalmatia and Croatia".
2. The organization was named "Board for Old Serbia and Macedonia" (Одбор за Стару Србију и Македонију) in 1877, and was also called "Brotherhood of Serb-Macedonians and Old-Serbians" (Братство Србо–Македонаца и Старо–Србијанаца) and "Serb-Macedonians and Old-Serbs" (Србомаћедонци и Старосрби), in 1885.
3. In the treatise Badžović concludes that the speech of Slavs of Albania and Macedonia (that of Mijaks and Brsjaks who inhabit said lands, until the Struma river) belongs to the Serbian language as a sub-speech (podnarečje), noting the usage of Ć (Ћ), Đ (Ђ), Dž (Џ), as opposed to Št (Щ), Žd (Жд), G (Г), in pronunciation; the Yat reflexes; belonging to the "Shtokavian-Ekavian subdivision". He noted that the local epic poetry is most often decasyllable, as in Serbian, and traditionally mentioned medieval Serbian rulers.

== See also ==
- Association of Serbo-Macedonians

== Sources ==
- Arhiv Srbije (1983). Građa za istoriju makedonskog naroda iz Arhiva Srbije: knj. 1. 1868-1873. Arhiv Srbije. pp. 18–.
- Cvetković, Sonja C. (2019). "СИНЕСТЕЗИЈА ВИЗУЕЛНОГ И МУЗИЧКОГ – ВИЋЕНТИЈЕ ПЕТРИК: МАРШ МИЛОША С. МИЛОЈЕВИЋА". Баштина (48). Приштина–Лепосавић.
- Džambazovski, Kliment (1965). "Stojan Novaković i makedonizam". Историјски Часопис. 14–15. Istorijski institut.
- Hadži-Vasiljević, Jovan (1933). "Баџовићи". Вардар. II (46–47): 2–.
- Hadži-Vasiljević, Jovan (1921). "Милојко В. Веселиновић". Братство. XV. Београд: 262–268.
- Jagodić, Miloš (2011). "Планови o политици Србије према Старој Србији и Македонији (1878-1885)". Историјски Часопис. 60: 435–460.
- Lilić, Borislava (2015). "ОСЛОБОЂЕЊЕ НИША У ДРУГОМ СРПСКО-ТУРСКОМ РАТУ 1877/78. У СПИСИМА САВРЕМЕНИКА" (PDF). Zbornik. 13. Niš: Narodni muzej Niš: 155–172.
- Mitrović, Andrej (1996). Stojanu Novakoviću u spomen: o osamdesetogodišnjici smrti. Srpska književna zadruga. p. 68. ISBN 9788637906247.
- Perić, Miodrag (2015). "Македонска емиграција у балканским земљама у време Источне кризе 1875-1881. године". Politička revija. 46 (4): 187–202. doi:10.22182/pr.4642015.11.
- Šešum, Uroš (2020). "Српске школе и учитељи у Старој Србији и Македонији у Великој источној кризи". Јован Ристић, Државник И Дипломата-Берлински Конгрес-(140 Година Од Међународног Признања И Независности Србије): 147–200.
- Vojinović, Staniša (2016). "Учитељ, публициста и национални радник Деспот с. Баџовић". Вардарски Зборник. 11: 109–120.
- Vučetić, Biljana (2012). Наша ствар у Османском царству [Our Issue in the Ottoman Empire]. Istorijski institut. pp. 27–28, 143, 166. ISBN 978-86-7743-095-5.
- Vučetić, Biljana (2018). Богдан Раденковић (1874-1917). Istorijski institut. ISBN 978-86-7743-123-5.
- Javni zborovi Srbo-Maćedonaca i Starosrba držani u Beogradu, Nišu i Vranji u februaru i martu 1885 g. kao i sastanak beogradskih velikoškolaca od 10. marta 1885. o bugarskim težnjama na Maćedoniju. Štamparija Napredne stranke. 1885.
- Годишњица Николе Чупића (1914). "Годишњица Николе Чупића". Годишњица Николе Чупића. 33: 315–.
