= Macedonian kinship =

The Macedonian language has one of the more elaborate kinship (сродство, роднинство) systems among European languages. Most words are common to other Slavic languages, though some derive from Turkish. Terminology may differ from place to place; the terms used in the Standard are listed below, dialectical or regional forms are marked ^{[Dial.]} and colloquial forms ^{[Coll.]}.

There are four main types of kinship in the family: biological a.k.a. blood kinship, kinship by law (in-laws), spiritual kinship (such as godparents), and legal kinship through adoption and remarriage. Traditionally, three generations of a family will live together in a home in what anthropologists call a joint family structure (reminiscent of the historical zadruga units), where parents, their son(s), and grandchildren would cohabit in a family home.

== Direct descendance and ancestry ==
Words for relations up to five generations removed—great-great-grandparents and great-great-grandchildren—are in common use. The fourth-generation terms are also used as generics for ancestors and descendants. There is no distinction between the maternal and paternal line.

Macedonian Cyrillic	Transliteration	Relation
чукунвнука	chukunvnuka	great-great-granddaughter
чукунвнук	chukunvnuk	great-great-grandson
правнука	pravnuka	great-granddaughter
правнук	pravnuk	great-grandson
внука	vnuka	granddaughter
внук	vnuk	grandson
ќерка	kjerka	daughter
син	sin	son
мајка	majka	mother
татко	tatko	father
баба	baba	grandmother
дедо	dedo	grandfather
прабаба	prababa	great-grandmother
прадедо	pradedo	great-grandfather
чукунбаба	chukunbaba	great-great-grandmother
чукундедо	chukundedo	great-great-grandfather

== Ego's generation ==
Macedonian does not have separate terms for first cousins, second cousins and so forth, but uses втор братучед (lit. "second cousin"), трет братучед (lit. "third cousin"), etc.

Macedonian Cyrillic	Transliteration	Relation
брат	brat	brother
сестра	sestra	sister
батко, бато	batko, bato	older brother
дада	dada	older sister
братучед	bratuched	male cousin
братучетка	bratuchetka	female cousin

== Relatives ==
Macedonian Cyrillic	Transliteration	Relation
вујко	vujko	uncle (mother's brother)
вујна	vujna	aunt (mother's brother's wife)
стрико, чичко	striko, chichko	uncle (father's brother)
стрина, нина	strina, nina	aunt (father's brother's wife)
тетка	tetka	aunt (father's or mother's sister)
тетин	tetin	uncle (father's or mother's sister's husband)

== Step-relatives ==
Macedonian Cyrillic	Transliteration	Relation
очув	ochuv	stepfather
маќеа	makjea	stepmother
пасинок, пoсинок, пасторок	pasinok, posinok, pastorok	stepson
паштерка	pashterka	stepdaughter
полусестра	polusestra	stepsister
полубрат	polubrat	stepbrother

== In-laws ==
Macedonian Cyrillic	Transliteration	Relation	English translation
свекор	svekor	husband's father	father-in-law
свекрва	svekrva	husband's mother	mother-in-law
тест, дедо	test, dedo	wife's father	father-in-law
тешта, баба	tešta, baba	wife's mother	mother-in-law
зет	zet	daughter's or sister's husband	son-in-law or brother-in-law
снаа	snaa	son's or brother's wife	daughter-in-law or sister-in-law
шура	shura	wife's brother	brother-in-law
шурнајка	shurnajka	wife's brother's wife	sister-in-law
свеска, балдаза	sveska, baldaza	wife's sister	sister-in-law
баџанак	badjanak	wife's sister's husband	co-brother-in-law
девер	dever	husband's brother	brother-in-law
золва	zolva	husband's sister	sister-in-law
јатрва	jatrva	husband's brother's wife	co-sister-in-law
сват	svat	child's spouse's father	co-father-in-law
сваќа	svakja	child's spouse's mother	co-mother-in-law
