= Ivan Gologanov =

Bulgarian teacher (1839–1895)

- Иван Илиев Гологанов
- Born: 1839; Tarlis, Ottoman Empire, today Drama, Greece
- Died: 1895 (aged 55–56); Krushovo, Ottoman Empire, today Serres, Greece
- Occupations: Teacher and folklorist

Ivan Gologanov (Bulgarian: Иван Гологанов; 1839–1895) was a Bulgarian teacher who forged the collection Veda Slovena. He was a collaborator of folklorist Stefan Verković.

== Biography ==
Ivan Iliev Gologanov was born in 1839 in Tarlis, Ottoman Empire (modern Drama, Greece). His brother was Theodosius Gologanov. He received education in his birthplace in Greek. In the 1850s, he learned the Cyrillic script. Gologanov was fluent in ancient and modern Greek, knew Greek mythology and the work of Homer, and wrote original mythological poetry. He worked as a teacher in Tarlis, Krushevo, and Serres (where he also engaged in trade). After pan-Slavic ethnographer and folklorist Stefan Verković arrived in Serres in 1865, he started collaborating with him. Through this collaboration, he forged the collection Veda Slovena. However, Verković issued the collection under his own name. Gologanov claimed that he personally found and wrote down the songs. He took Georgi Rakovski's theories about the Sanskrit origin of the Slavs and Greek mythology as a basis for the songs.

Gologanov participated in the Bulgarian church movement. In 1893, Atanas Shopov, general secretary of the Bulgarian Exarchate in Constantinople, wrote about him:

That Mr. Iv. Gologanov enjoyed and enjoys great importance and fame in Serres area. The influential Greek circles in Serres, as well as the leadership of the Serres Monastery "St. Ivan the Forerunner" gives him great honors because he has influence among his compatriots. Mr. Ivan Gologanov has deep knowledge of the Greek language, and in the Bulgarian book he is self-educated.

Gologanov went to Constantinople in 1894. He died in 1895 in Krushovo, Ottoman Empire (modern Serres, Greece).
