= Temko Popov =

Serbian national activist (1855–1929)

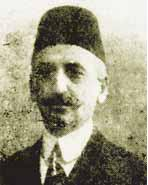
- Born: Темистокли Попов c. 1855; Ohrid, Ottoman Empire
- Died: 1929; Ohrid, Kingdom of Serbs, Croats and Slovenes
- Other names: Temko Popov (Темко Попов); Temko Popović (Темко Поповић)
- Organizations: Secret Macedonian Committee; Association of Serbo-Macedonians; Society of Saint Sava; Serb Democratic League
- Known for: Being a Macedonian national activist and an activist of the Serbian national movement in Macedonia

Temko Popov(ić) (Macedonian: Темко Попов(иќ); Serbian: Темко Попов(ић); 1855–1929) was a pro-Macedonian activist and Serbian national worker in the Ottoman Empire. He was an early proponent of the idea that the Macedonians Slavs are a distinct nation. Popov was among the founders and leaders of the Sofia-based organization Secret Macedonian Committee and ended up siding with the Serbian national cause.

== Life ==
Popov was born in 1855 in Ohrid, then part of the Ottoman Empire. As part of the Ottoman Macedonian upper-middle class, he received a Greek education. However, the Greek education did not manage to make him feel as a Greek. Instead, the education resulted in him developing a vague feeling of Macedonianness, as a supra-national identity. Apart from Athens, Greece, he was also educated in Ohrid, and worked as a teacher in schools in Edirne and Bitola. Historians do not know when exactly he came into contact with Serbian diplomatic circles or an official Serbian agenda. After the Serbo-Bulgarian War in 1885, he moved to Sofia, Bulgaria, where he was among the first Macedonists, founders and leaders of the anti-Bulgarian Secret Macedonian Committee (SMC), which promoted the idea that the Macedonian Slavs are a distinct nation. The other founders and leaders were Naum Evro(vić), Kosta Grupče(vić) and Vasil(ije) Karajovov(ić). It marked the beginning of the pro-Serbian activities of its activists. At that time, he assisted in the authorship of the brochure Serbian Propaganda, which was anonymously published in Sofia.

In August 1886, SMC's leaders went to Belgrade, where they had negotiations with the Serbian government and reached an agreement for cooperation and assistance, for the restoration of the Archbishopric of Ohrid with its own hierarchy, creation of schools and hiring teachers for education the Macedonian language (but in the Serbian alphabet), etc. A newspaper and booklets in that language were printed, all with Serbian financial support. SMC wanted a compromise with Serbian interests in Ottoman Macedonia, so Popov abandoned the autonomist program. After the Bulgarian authorities discovered and dismantled SMC, he emigrated to Belgrade. He switched from his vague feeling of Macedonianness to Serbian nationhood. Popov sided with the Serbian national cause. Serbian politician Stojan Novaković was among his sponsors. He followed Novaković's philological views and wanted to bring the Macedonian vernacular closer to standard Serbian, avoiding the use of definite articles and introducing Serbian terms. For him, these were "more natural" to Macedonian than the standard Bulgarian loanwords. He promoted the introduction of Serbian loanwords into the Macedonian language to challenge Bulgarian influence. In 1887, he wrote the anti-Exarchist treatise "Who is to blame", which was written in his native Ohrid dialect and in a phonetic orthography close to Vuk Karadžić's orthography. From Belgrade, he was sent by the Serbian authorities in Thessaloniki, where he was infiltrated to work in the Bulgarian high school as an economist. However, in 1887, he was expelled because of his pro-Serbian propaganda. In 1888, in a letter to Despot Badžović, Popov emphasized the most important aim: to Macedonize the Macedonian Slavs. In the same letter, he stated:

"Let us not lie to ourselves, Despot, the national spirit in Macedonia has reached such a stage today that even if Jesus Christ had come to the Earth, he would not have been able to persuade the Macedonian that he was a Bulgarian or a Serb, excepting those Macedonians in whom Bulgarian propaganda has already taken root."

At that time, "Macedonism" was seen by Novaković as a possible counterweight to Bulgarian influence in Ottoman Macedonia and as a stage to the gradual Serbianization of the Macedonian Slavs.

Bulgarian national activist Kuzman Shapkarev wrote in a letter to Marin Drinov on 10 September 1888 about him and Kosta Grupčević: "A freak - Temko Popov, who is the son of Stefan Vladikov, the illegitimate son of the Ohrid Greek bishop, an earlier traitor to the late Dimitar Miladinov... Temko Popov and Kosta Grubchev [i.e. Grupčević] - today these two gnaw the bones of the Serbian embassy in Constantinople, lying that they will turn the Macedonian Bulgarians into old Serbs." Popov moved back to Belgrade where the Saint Sava Society helped him materially to his new assignment at work. This compromise with the Serbian interests led later to the abandonment of the separatist program altogether. On 23 June 1889, the Serbian consul in Thessaloniki confirmed in a letter that Popov was promoting the Serbian cause around cities in Ottoman Macedonia. From 24 April 1889, he received a salary from the Serbian Ministry of Internal Affairs for work in Thessaloniki's Serbian consulate. In 1905, the publishers of the Belgrade newspaper Autonomous Macedonia invited him to join their "autonomist program", however he declined, as he was working in the Serbian embassy in Athens and was entirely in the service for Serbian interests. After the Young Turk Revolution, Popov became a Serbian deputy in the Ottoman parliament in 1908/1909, when he lived in Constantinople. Here, along with Kosta Grupčević, he issued the Serbian newspaper Carigradski glasnik, which was issued in standard Serbian and promoted Serbian ideas. After the death of Grupčević, he became the main editor of the newspaper in 1909. In 1913, after the Balkan Wars, he became the first Serbian mayor of Ohrid, just ceded to Serbia, until the Bulgarian occupation in 1915. After World War I, he was again the mayor of Ohrid. He was also a deputy in the Yugoslav parliament in the 1920s. Popov died in Ohrid in 1929.

== Sources ==
- Društvo Sv. Save (1936). Spomenica Društva Svetoga Save, 1886-1936. Društvo Sv. Save.
- Биљана Вучетић (1 September 2012). Наша ствар у Османском царству: Our Issue in the Ottoman Empire. Istorijski institut. pp. 63, 107. ISBN 978-86-7743-095-5.
