= Folk Songs of the Macedonian Bulgarians =

1860 collection of folk songs

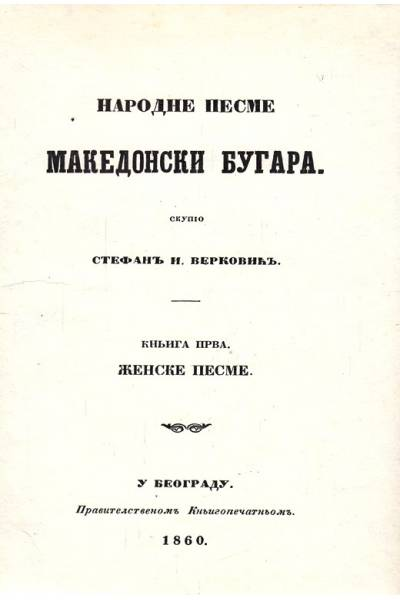
The cover of the book.

Folk Songs of the Macedonian Bulgarians (Serbian: Народне песме Македонски Бугара, Bulgarian: Народни песни на македонските българи, Macedonian: Народни песни на Македонските Бугари) is an ethnographic collection of folk songs collected by Stefan Verković, considered to be his most valuable contribution to the field of Bulgarian folklore. It was published in Serbian in 1860, in Belgrade.

== Content ==
The book was published in Belgrade in 1860 by Stefan Verković. Its subtitle is "Book One: Female Songs". It contains 335 folk songs that are lyrical, sung only by women and were therefore called female by Verković. 270 of the songs were collected from the singer Dafina of Serres region, who was praised by Verković as the "Bulgarian female Homer". The songs were collected by him during his time as a Serbian ethological agent in then-Ottoman town of Serres (today in Greece). The collected material was from the eastern parts of the Macedonian region. The title, preface, notes and explanations of the songs are in Serbian, while also containing a dedication to Julia Hunyadi, who was princess consort of Serbia. At the end there is an explanation of unknown words in Serbian. However, the songs are in their original form. In the preface, Verković states that he called the songs "Bulgarian" as opposed to Slavic because "if you ask a Macedonian Slav "What are you?", he will immediately answer to you: "I am Bulgarian and I call my language Bulgarian". He also clarifies that the Macedonian Bulgarians were called Slavs in the books of Cyril and Methodius and their disciples (9th century), and later they did adopt the name "Bulgarian", which was a political, rather than an ethnic name.

== Publications and reception ==
Verković states that he was planning to publish a second volume of the collection. Due to his involvement in the Veda Slovena debate, he was unable to publish the second volume and the materials he collected were published as "Сборникъ Верковича. Ι. Народныя пѣсни македонскихъ болгаръ" (Verković's Collection. Folk Songs of the Macedonian Bulgarians) in 1920 in Petrograd.

In 1961, the book was re-published by Macedonian folklorist Kiril Penušliski in Skopje under the title "Македонски народни песни" (Macedonian Folk Songs), although Verković did not describe in his collection any presence of Macedonian national consciousness then. All references to 'Macedonian Bulgarians' and the original foreword explaining the Bulgarian ethnicity of the Macedonian Slavs were omitted from the publication. According to Bulgarian sources, its goal was "the obliteration of the Bulgarian historical and collective memory and building a new Macedonian national identity in its place."

The book was re-published for the second time in Bulgarian by Bulgarian literary historian and folklorist Petar Dinekov in 1966. In addition to the original text, a translation into Bulgarian of Verković's preface was made and an introductory study was added.

The collection is regarded as Verković's most valuable contribution to the field of Bulgarian folklore. Dinekov criticized the book for having too many inaccuracies, irregularities, inconsistencies in the recordings of the songs and the language being often corrupted; a number of materials being unfinished; the size of the poetic lines often changing; numerous individual verses being incomplete or elongated, disrupting the metrics and rhythm due to carelessness and haste in recording (perhaps also due to a lack of musical sense), and because the songs were mostly spoken, recited, and not sung; the absence of a clearly expressed melody led to metrical instability in the reproduction of the text.

== See also ==
- Bulgarian Folk Songs
- Political views on the Macedonian language
