= Mihail Petruševski =

Yugoslav Macedonian academic, philologist

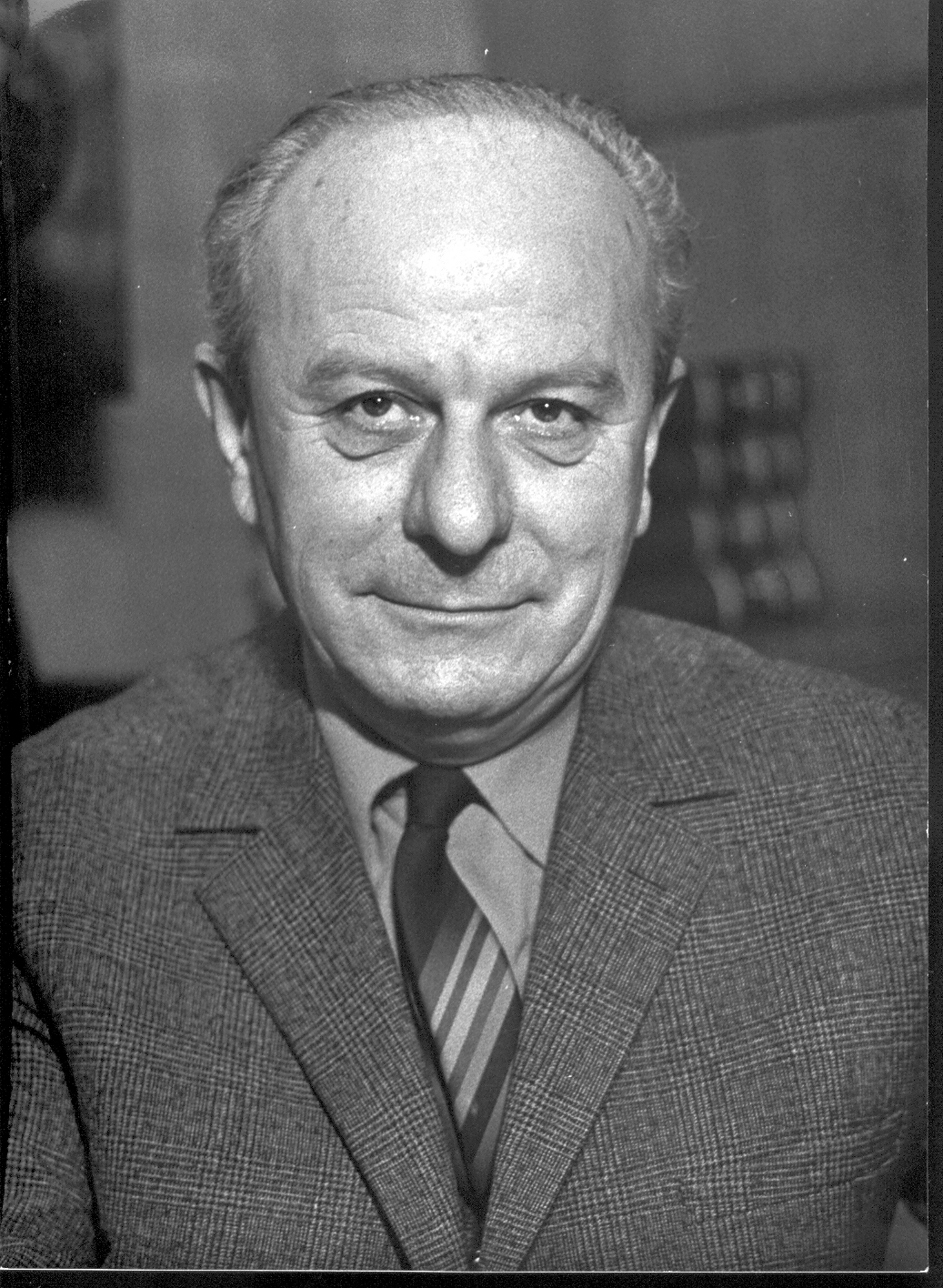
Mihail Petruševski

Mihail Petruševski (Macedonian and Serbian Cyrillic: Михаил Петрушевски; July 2, 1911, Bitola – February 27, 1990) was a Yugoslav Macedonian academic, philologist and founder of the Faculty of Philosophy at the Skopje University. He published over 200 philosophic works, but his translation of Homer's "Iliad" and his adaptation of "Skanderbeg" by Grigor Parlichev were considered particularly significant for Macedonian culture.

Petruševski was also a committee member on the first Committee for the Standardization of the Macedonian Alphabet, and a former rector of Saints Cyril and Methodius University, Skopje.
