= Spasoje Hadži Popović =

Serbian teacher and newspaper editor (1882–1926)

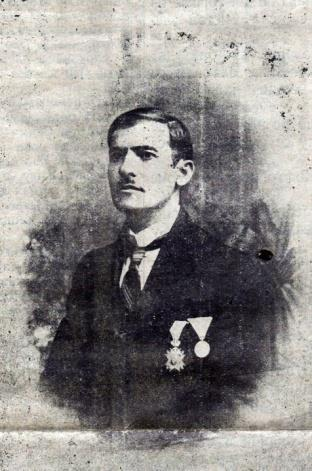
Spasoje Hadži Popović in 1910

Spasoje Hadži Popović (Serbian Cyrillic: Спасоје Хаџи Поповић; 18 August 1882 – 3 July 1926) was a Serbian teacher in Bitola and editor of the newspaper Južne Zvezde (Southern Stars). He was born in Buf, in the Ottoman Empire (now Greece). Growing up, he was a witness to the conflict between the Ecumenical Patriarchate of Constantinople and the Bulgarian Exarchate, which divided the Slavic Christian people in Ottoman Macedonia. He enrolled in the Serbian Gymnasium in Bitola in 1899 and subsequently in the teacher school in Aleksinac, which had been moved there from Belgrade, together with many pupils from Ottoman territory. He was a member of the Saint Sava Society. Popović was murdered by VMRO agents, who conducted a range of assassinations and terrorist acts against Serbs at that time.

== Sources ==
- Društvo sv. Save (1927). Brastvo. Vol. 21. Društvo sv. Save. pp. 323–.
- Popović, Bogdan; Skerlić, Jovan (1926). Srpski književni glasnik. Vol. 18–19. pp. 559–.
