= Stefan Verković =

Bosnian ethnographer and folklorist (1821–1893)

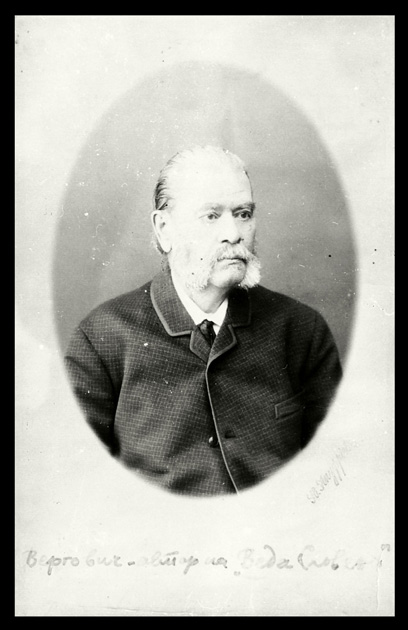
- A photograph of Verković
- Born: Stjepan Ilija Verković; March 4, 1821; Ugljara, Sanjak of Zvornik, Ottoman Empire
- Died: December 30, 1893 (aged 72); Sofia, Bulgaria
- Citizenship: Ottoman, Bulgarian
- Occupations: Ethnographer, folklorist

Stefan Ilija Verković was a 19th-century Bosnian ethnographer and folklorist. He initially supported the South Slav and Serbian cause, and later the Bulgarian national cause.

== Early life and work ==
Verković was born in the village of Ugljara near Orašje in the region of Bosanska Posavina, Ottoman Empire, on March 4, 1821, into a poor peasant family. He was christened as Stjepan. Per historian Ivo Banac, Verković was a Serbianized Croat. Verković was orphaned early and taken in by relatives. He passed his education in the Franciscan school of Tolisa from 1830 to 1833. In 1835, he became a monk at the Franciscan Sutjeska monastery. He studied philosophy and theology at the Zagreb University, where he was influenced by the ideas of the pan-South-Slavic Illyrian movement and became an acquaintance of the Croatian linguist Ljudevit Gaj. Verković left the Franciscan order in 1842 and theological studies in 1843, after the Illyrian movement was banned by the Austrian authorities. The career of a Catholic clergyman had failed to captivate him.

Verković came into contact with Serbian Interior Minister Ilija Garašanin through Toma Kovačević, and became Garašanin's agent. According to Verković himself, he became his agent in 1862. Verković became a proponent of the Serbian national cause. In the period of 1843–1850, he travelled to Montenegro, bringing confidential post to Petar II, and collected information in northern Albania, Kosovo, Macedonia and Bulgaria. Since 1851, he was only in Belgrade temporarily, mostly travelling in Macedonia and Bulgaria where he collected manuscripts, coins and folk songs. Verković collected folk material himself and also used collaborators, mostly teachers. He lived in Belgrade in 1854–55 during the Crimean War, and converted to Orthodox Christianity.

== Later work ==
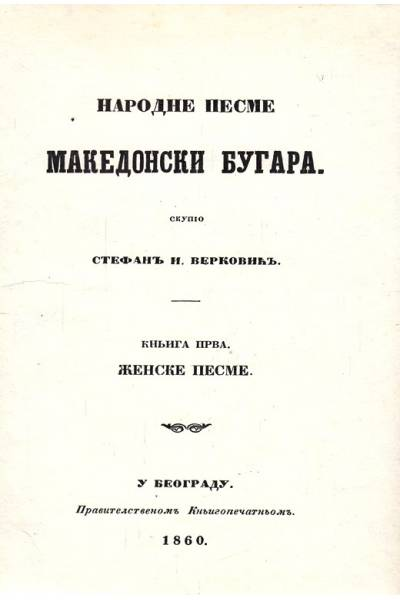
The cover of the book Folk Songs of the Macedonian Bulgarians

He moved to the Ottoman Empire and settled in Serres in 1857, and was given the task of countering the Hellenization of Macedonian Slavs and convince them that they are Serbs by Garašanin. His pseudonym was "Petar Vlašić" in correspondence. In 1860 and 1862, he lived in Belgrade where he published Folk Songs of the Macedonian Bulgarians. Verković noted in the foreword of book that the title was chosen because the locals identified themselves as Bulgarians. In 1862, Verković says he was sent by Garašanin to work on Macedonian Slavs to consider themselves as Slavs, rather than Greeks, and thus helping to resolve the Eastern Question. He became a member of Society of Serbian Letters in 1863.

With the increased conflict between Serbian and Bulgarian propaganda in Macedonia, he favored the latter, which went unnoticed. After 1868, he gradually disassociated himself from the official Serbian position due to his sympathy for the locals. He received irregular payments between 1872 and 1876, when his tenure as Serbian agent ended.

He published the mystification Veda Slovena under his name in two volumes, 1874 and 1881, which claimed to have contained " Bulgarian folk songs of the pre-historical and pre-Christian age, discovered in Thrace and Macedonia". With Veda Slovena, Verković attempted to prove that Slavic values and culture existed before Homer and that the Greeks appropriated them. It is unclear whether Verković was aware of the forgery. Verković believed that the Macedonian Bulgarians originated from ancient Macedonians and Thracians. In February 1877, he moved to Russia, where he lived in poverty. The Principality of Bulgaria granted him a pension and citizenship, and he moved to Sofia in early 1891. In this period, he conducted ethnological expeditions in the region of the Rhodope Mountains, where he unsuccessfully attempted to prove the authenticity of Veda Slovena. Verković has been subject to criticism by researchers of his work for inaccuracy in transmitting the formal and linguistic features of songs. He died in Sofia on December 30, 1893.

== Legacy ==
His work had contributed to a general upsurge of Bulgarian folklore studies. Some unpublished folklore material by him was published after his death, such as: 9 songs in the Collection of Folk Thoughts, volume X, 1894; two tales from Thessaloniki (magazine Macedonian Review, volume IV, 1928); tales and songs in Greek script (published by Bulgarian philologist Stoyan Romanski). Materials by Verković were also published in two books, such as Verkovich's Collection, I, Folk Songs of Macedonian Bulgarians (Petrograd, 1920), edited by Russian linguist Pyotr Lavrov and South Macedonian Folk Tales. From the Manuscripts of St. Verkovich, published in Prague in 1932 by Lavrov, along with Czech linguist Jiří Polívka. Scholars Ivan Shishmanov, Kiril Penušliski and Mihail Arnaudov published biographies about him.

== Sources ==
- Banac, Ivo (1988). The National Question in Yugoslavia: Origins, History, Politics. Cornell University Press. ISBN 0801494931.
- Dinekov, Petar (2007). "Делото на Стефан Веркович". LiterNet (in Bulgarian).
- Dokletić, Ljubiša (1981). "Životni put Stjepana Verkovića (1821-1894)". Radovi (in Croatian). 14 (1).
- Heraclides, Alexis (2021). The Macedonian Question and the Macedonians: A History. Routledge. pp. 12, 196. ISBN 9780429266362.
- Leerssen, Joep (2016). "Gods, Heroes, and Mythologists: Romantic Scholars and the Pagan Roots of Europe's Nations". History of Humanities. 1 (1). doi:10.1086/685061.
- Trencsényi, Balázs; Kopeček, Michal (2007). "Veda Slovena". National Romanticism: The Formation of National Movements Discourses of Collective Identity in Central and Southeast Europe 1770–1945, volume II. Budapest: Central European University Press. ISBN 978-963-7326-60-8.
- Sardella, Ferdinando; Jacobsen, Knut A. (2020). Handbook of Hinduism in Europe (2 Vols). Brill. ISBN 978-90-04-43228-4.
- Sampimon, Janette (2006). Becoming Bulgarian: The Articulation of Bulgarian Identity in the Nineteenth Century in Its International Context: an Intellectual History. Pegasus. ISBN 9789061433118.
- Vojvodić, Vaso (1979). "Атанасије Николић: Опис радње". Мешовита грађа [Miscellanea]. 7. Belgrade: Istorijski institut.
- Rutar, Sabine (2014). Beyond the Balkans: Towards an Inclusive History of Southeastern Europe. LIT Verlag Münster. ISBN 9783643106582.
