= Marko Tsepenkov =

Bulgarian folklorist (1829–1920)

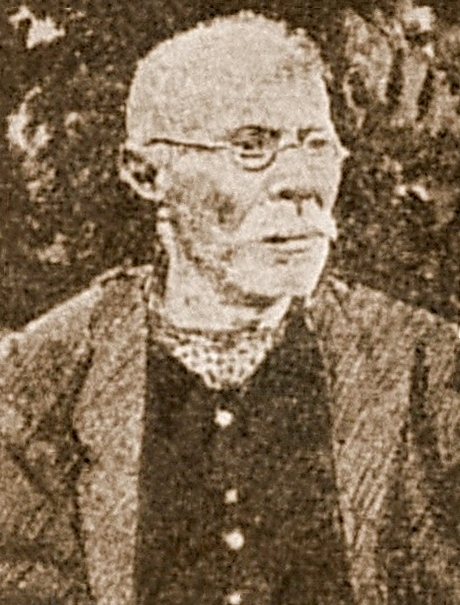
Marko Tsepenkov

Marko Kostov Tsepenkov (Bulgarian and Macedonian: Марко Костов Цепенков; 1829 – 1920) was a Bulgarian folklorist from Ottoman Macedonia. He was born in Prilep.

== Biography ==
His family moved to the town of Prilep in the Ottoman Empire from the nearby village of Oreovec. His father, Kosta, lived in Kruševo for some time before Marko was born in 1829 in Prilep. Since his father was a traveler, Tsepenkov earned the opportunity to travel. He lived in Ohrid and Struga and visited other places in the country by the time he was fourteen. Tsepenkov was educated in small Greek schools. In 1844 he moved to Prilep, where he attended the private school of Hadji pop Konstantin Dimkov and father Aleksa, for two years. He also became a tailor and while working in the shop he met a lot of people who would tell him folk stories. Since then, he became a collector of folk stories and other folk works. In 1857, Tsepenkov was a teacher in Prilep. After he met Dimitar Miladinov he started collecting more folk works: songs, stories, riddles, and others. In that time, he knew more than 150 stories and wrote one to two stories per week, as he mentioned in his Autobiography. Tsepenkov contacted with other figures of the Bulgarian National Revival period who noted down folklore, such as Kuzman Shapkarev and Metodi Kusev. He was influenced by the works of Georgi Rakovski, Vasil Cholakov, Ivan Blaskov and Dimitar Matov. In his tales, he depicted the Macedonian Christians as Bulgarians and the Macedonian Muslims as Pomaks, and the Macedonian vernacular as Bulgarian.

He moved with his family to Sofia in 1888. Here he was encouraged by professor Ivan Shishmanov, who included his recordings in several volumes of the “Collection of works of the popular spirit” (SBNU). In this collection, published until in 1900, Tsepenkov published many tales and legends, songs, a great number of beliefs and curses, interpretations of dreams, magic formulas, habits and rites, proverbs, riddles and folklore for children. Between 1896 and 1911, he published about 10 of his poems and his play "Cane Voivoda". He also wrote about a dozen songs with patriotic themes. Tsepenkov was in close relations with his countryman, then Metropolitan of Stara Zagora, Metodi Kusev. His writing career lasted over almost 40 years. He had collected 5,032 proverbs, 681 stories, 170 poems, 100 riddles, 389 beliefs, 46 incantations, 201 dreams and their interpretations, and 67 children's games. His "Autobiography" documented life in Prilep. He died in 1920 in Sofia.

== Legacy ==
The "Institute of Folklore" of the Bulgarian Academy of Sciences has a complete edition in six volumes of his folk materials. His collected folk works were published in ten books in the Socialist Republic of Macedonia in 1972. A selection of his folktales have been published in English, such as 19th Century Macedonian Folktales by the Macquarie University in Sydney in 1991. In his honor, the Macedonian institute for folklore is named after him. According to the Macedonian historiography in the post-World War II period, he was an ethnic Macedonian writer and poet. Per an UDBA document, the Macedonian cultural historian and folklorist Blaže Ristovski, who was director of the Institute of folklore "Marko Cepenkov" in Skopje, said there is no document where Tsepenkov presented himself as an ethnic Macedonian. A local publication in present-day North Macedonia published a non-redacted version of his work Siljan the Stork in 2006.
