= Society of Saint Sava =

- Formation: 1886
- Type: Non-governmental cultural association
- Location: Belgrade, Serbia
- Key people: Dr. Svetomir Nikolajević
- Affiliations: Serbian Ministry of Foreign Affairs

The Society of Saint Sava or Saint Sava Society (Serbian: Друштво „Свети Сава“/Društvo „Sveti Sava“) was a Serbian non-governmental association with the aim of promoting Serbian nationalism in Serb-claimed regions (such as Kosovo and Macedonia) in the Ottoman Empire, founded in 1886 in Belgrade, the capital of the Kingdom of Serbia.

== History ==
Ruling Serbian circles took the stance that only through books, schools and church there can be opposition against the strong Bulgarian and Greek propaganda in Kosovo and Macedonia. The Society of Saint Sava was founded in 1886 in Belgrade with the purpose of promoting Serbian nationalism in Serb-claimed regions, through education and propaganda. Its official motto was "A brother is dear, whatever his faith" (Serbian: "Брат је мио, које вере био"). A goal of the association was to protect Serbs in Ottoman Macedonia, suppress Bulgarian politics and the influence of the Bulgarian Exarchate. Svetomir Nikolajević was elected as the association's first president, who was moderate towards Greek claims, but strongly opposed Bulgarian claims in Ottoman Macedonia. The Ottoman administration in Macedonia supported the Serbs' activities, hoping to use them to counter the rising Bulgarian influence. The members of the association cooperated with the Serbian Ministry of Education and Church Affairs and the Ministry of Foreign Affairs, which funded the society. The Ministry of Education and Church Affairs approved the opening of schools and school programs. The Sant Sava Evening School was founded by the end of 1887, to provide basic education to youths from Kosovo and Macedonia. Apart from regular subjects, the students also had lessons in Serbian language, history and literature. The association disseminated Saint Sava's veneration in the Ottoman Empire.

The association's main task was to establish schools in Serb-claimed regions. In 1888 and 1889, the Serbs attracted many youths away from Bulgarian schools, with scholarships from the association to Belgrade and were active as far as Thessaloniki and Chalkidiki, which brought them in opposition with Patriarchist Greeks and Exarchist Bulgarians. By 1889, the association had opened 42 elementary schools. The association came under the direct authority of Serbia's foreign ministry. Later, some students came into opposition with the school authorities, who tried to convince them that they were Serbs and not Bulgarians. Some students returned home to continue their education and some former students protested the society's ideas, stating that they were Bulgarians, such as Dame Gruev, Kliment Boyadzhiev, Vladimir Boyadzhiev, Krste Misirkov and others.

The Serbian agency in Thessaloniki, propagating Yugoslavism, created organized groups of Serbian supporters in Skopje, Ohrid, Prizren, Veles, Bitola and Debar. This agency was assisted by the association. It organized special schools for children from Macedonia in Serbia and developed propaganda activities among Macedonian expatriates in Serbia. Due to the increased number of students in 1890, the Saint Sava Home was built, where the association's administration was located. In the same year, the association's support for an Ottoman subject led to a temporary halt in diplomatic relations between Bulgaria and Serbia. The association was supported by religious figures, such as Belgrade metropolitan Mihailo Jovanović. After 1890, the activity of the association was weakened. Serbian official circles tried to suppress its independence, while the Ottoman authorities increased the persecution of the association's members. Some students also publicly expressed pro-Bulgarian sentiments. In September 1891, the Ministry of Foreign Affairs suspended its support of the association, apparently to let Serbian consuls work on the Serbian cause. In 1895, the association gave credit to a church community in Pristina. The Bulgarians countered the activity of the Serbs with the organization Brotherhood of Mercy, which they founded in March 1897 in Thessaloniki, succeeding in limiting Serbian influence. In 1904, the association supported the bilingual magazine Albania. From 1887 to 1912, around 20,000 students from the southern regions studied in the association's schools in Belgrade.

== Members ==
Founders

- Svetomir Nikolajević, founder
- Kosta Šumenković, founder
- Stevan Vladislav Kaćanski, founder
- Milan Đ. Milićević, founder
- Ljubomir Kovačević, founder
- Panta Srećković, founder
- Miloš Milojević, founder
- Milojko Veselinović, founder
- Firmilijan Drazic, founder

Others

- Temko Popović
- Jovan Hadži-Vasiljević, secretary, editor of Brastvo
- Spasoje Hadži Popović

Students

- Dame Gruev
- Petar Poparsov
- Dimitrija Čupovski
- Krste Misirkov

== Legacy ==
In 1994, an association with the same name was founded by 80 university professors.
