= Mogorče =

- Village
- Могорче
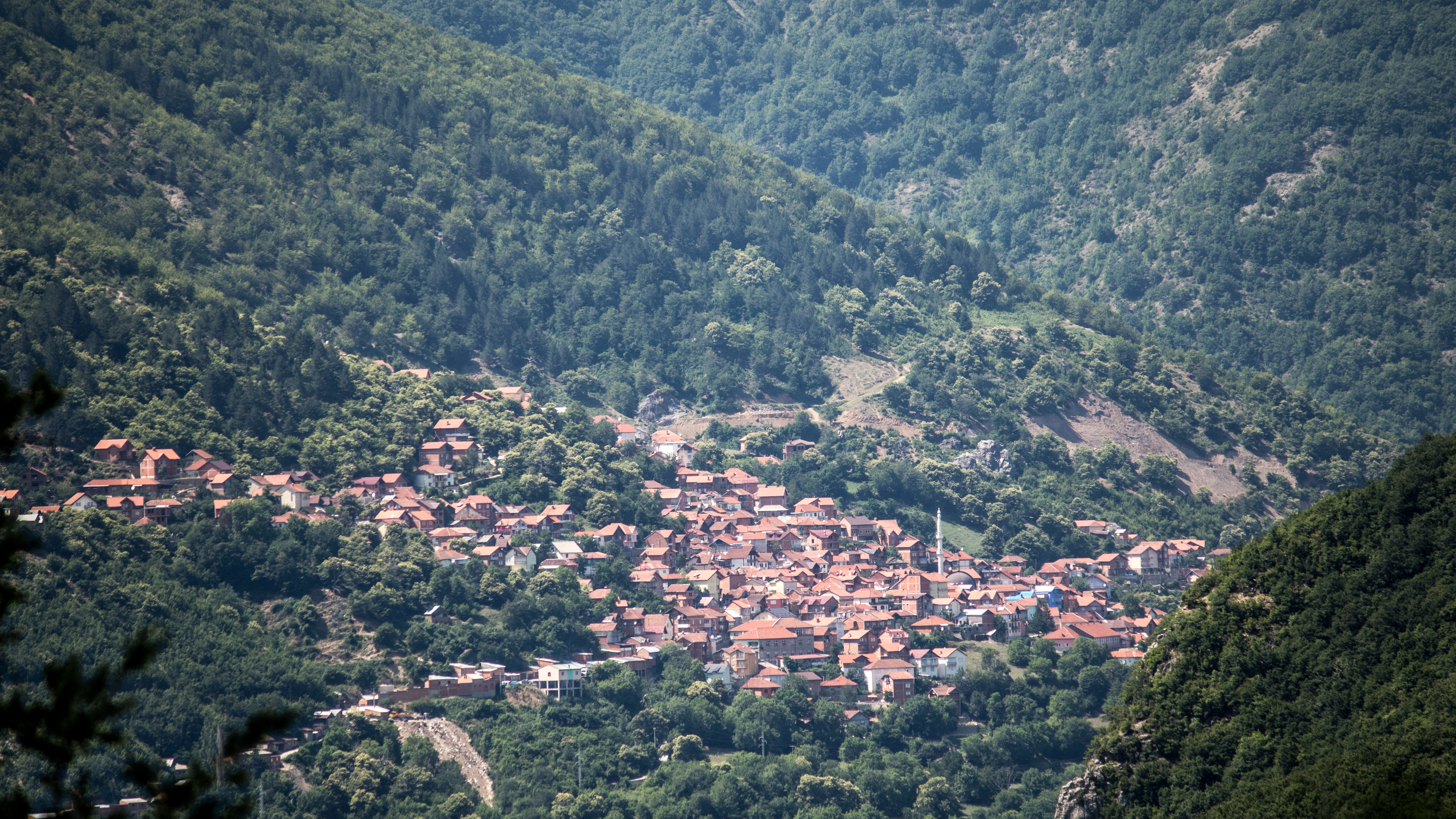

- Location within North Macedonia
- Coordinates: 41°32′N 20°37′E
- Country: North Macedonia
- Region: Southwestern
- Municipality: Debar

Population (2021)
  - Total: 1,334
- Time zone: UTC+1 (CET)
  - Summer (DST): UTC+2 (CEST)
- Car plates: DB
- Website: .

Mogorče (Macedonian: Могорче) is a village in the municipality of Debar, in the area of Mala Reka, North Macedonia. Near the village is the Elen Skok bridge.

== Demographics ==
Mogorče (Movirçe) is recorded in the Ottoman defter of 1467 as a settlement in the ziamet of Reka. The village had a total of five households, the heads of which in majority bore typical Albanian personal names, albeit in minority alongside Slavic personal names: Nenka i Kojos; Pop Janko; Peter Berisha; Petër Lasteniça; Vasili from Çermenika.

Mogorče has also traditionally been inhabited by Orthodox Macedonians and a Torbeš population.

According to the 2002 census, the village had a total of 1,794 inhabitants. Ethnic groups in the village include:

- Macedonians 1,408
- Turks 350
- Albanians 26
- Bosniaks 1
- Romani 1
- Others 7

According to the 2021 census, the village had a total of 1,334 inhabitants. Ethnic groups in the village include:

- 104 Macedonians
- 4 Albanians
- 884 Turks
- 2 Bosniaks
- 10 others
- 320 without data
