= Ugljara =

Village in Bosnia and Herzegovina

- Village
- Location within Bosnia and Herzegovina
- Coordinates: 45.036072°N 18.6747855°E
- Country: Bosnia and Herzegovina
- Entity: Federation of Bosnia and Herzegovina
- Canton: Posavina
- Municipality: Orašje

Area
  - Total: 0.59 sq mi (1.52 km^{2})

Population (2013)
  - Total: 1,205
  - Density: 2,050/sq mi (793/km^{2})
- Time zone: UTC+1 (CET)
  - Summer (DST): UTC+2 (CEST)

Ugljara is a village in the municipality of Orašje, Bosnia and Herzegovina.

== Demographics ==
According to the 2013 census, its population was 1,205.

Ethnicity in 2013
Ethnicity	Number	Percentage
Croats	1,165	96.7%
Serbs	12	1.0%
Bosniaks	8	0.7%
other/undeclared	20	1.7%
Total	1,205	100%
