= Veda Slovena =

19th-century collection

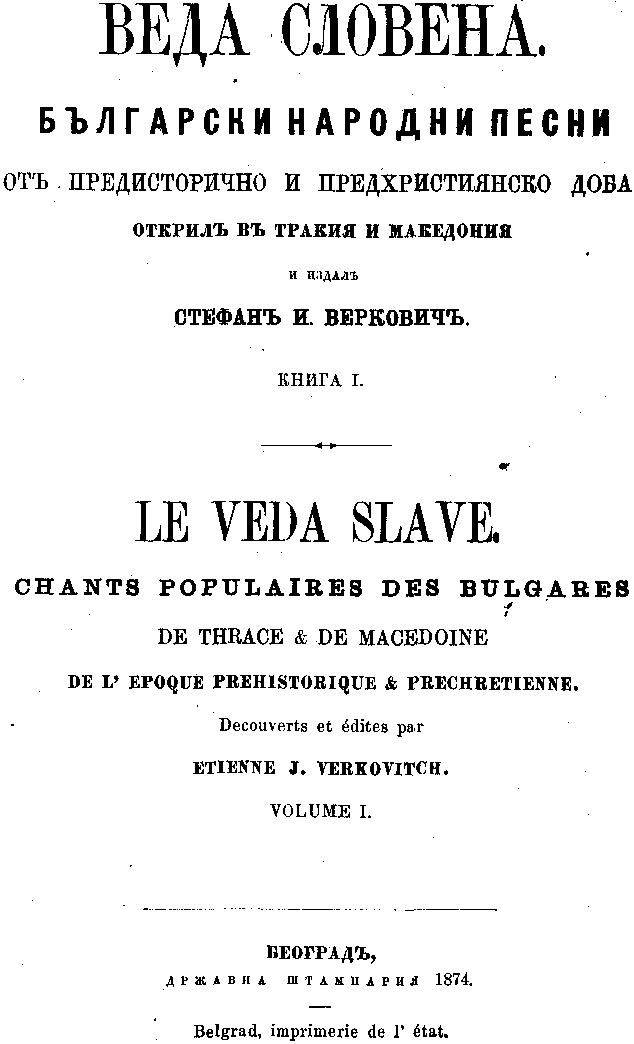
Cover of the first volume

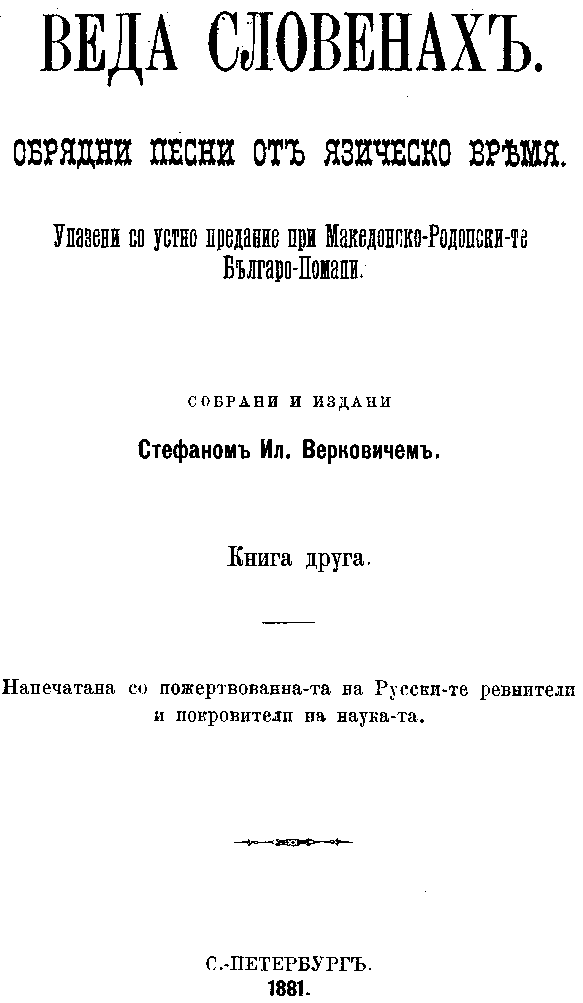
Cover of the second volume

Veda Slovena (Bulgarian: Веда Словена), (Note: Originally published as Веда Словена. Български народни песни от предисторична и предхристиянска доба. Открил в Тракия и Македония и издал Стефан Н. Веркович. Книга І, Београд, 1874 (Veda Slovena. Bulgarian folk songs from pre-historical and Pre-Christian Age. Discovered in Thrace and Macedonia and edited by Stefan N. Verkovich. First book, Belgrade, 1874) and Веда Словенахъ. Обредни песни от язическо време. Упазени со устно предание при македонско-родопските българо-помаци. Книга друга, С.-Петербург, 1881 (Ritual songs from the pagan age. Preserved in oral legends of the Macedonian-Rhodopian Bulgaro-Pomaks. Second book, Saint Petersburg, 1881).) also known as Slavic Veda, is a collection of songs and legends published by Bosnian Croat folklorist Stjepan Verković. The first volume was printed in 1874 in Belgrade and the second in 1881 in Saint Petersburg. The collection is a famous forgery.

== Publication and content ==
The first volume was published in Belgrade in 1874 and the second in Saint Petersburg in 1881 under the name of Stjepan Verković. However, the author was the Bulgarian teacher Ivan Gologanov, who claimed that he personally found and wrote down the songs. The collection consists of 23,809 lines.

In the introduction, Verković claimed a "strange kinship" between the mythology of the texts and the Rigveda. The book was presented as a collection of folk songs and myths, in the style of the Vedas, containing legends about the origin of the plough, sickle, viticulture, and writing, but also stories about the Hindu gods, Vishnu, Shiva and Agni, Greek mythological figures Orpheus and Atlas, Philip II and Alexander the Great, the Trojan War, etc. The collection also narrated about the emigration of the Slavs from India. Verković claimed that the songs originated from prehistoric and pre-Christian times, and were collected "from the Macedonian-Rhodopean Bulgarian Pomaks". The songs were heavily influenced by the theories about the Sanskrit origin of the Slavs and the Thracians by Bulgarian national activist Georgi Rakovski. Apart from the theories of Rakovski, Gologanov took Greek mythology as a basis for the songs.

== Authenticity ==
Veda Slovena caused a scientific debate about its authenticity. The collection was initially accepted as authentic by European and Russian scholars, including Albert Dumont. Initially, scholars believed that Gologanov as a village teacher was unable to create the works. However, Gologanov had received Greek education, knew ancient and modern Greek, was familiar with Greek mythology and the work of Homer, and wrote original mythological poetry.

Petko Slaveykov theorized that the collection was authored by multiple people, who took money from Verković for the works. It is unclear whether Verković was aware of the forgery. In 1891 and 1892, when he was receiving pension from Bulgaria, Verković went back to the Western Rhodopes (Chepino Valley and Batak Mountain), in an unsuccessful attempt to find the singers of the songs and demonstrate the authenticity of the collection. Most scholars, including Vatroslav Jagić, Alexander Pypin, Konstantin Jireček, as well as the leading Bulgarian scholars then, Ivan Shishmanov, Marin Drinov, and Aleksandar Teodorov-Balan, did not believe in the authenticity of the collection's songs and thought that Verković was misled by Gologanov. Jireček said that the collection imitated the quasi-historical songs that Rakovski made in Some words about Asen I. Pypin said that the collection was a response to Rakovski's demands about the collection of national material. Leading Western European, Russian and Bulgarian scholars demonstrated that the collection is a forgery, containing contemporary forgeries. The singers, by whom the songs were supposedly collected, never existed, and such songs were never known. Bulgarian literary historian Mihail Arnaudov concluded that the collection is a forgery in his study "Verkovich and the Veda Slovena" in 1968. The Bulgarian Encyclopedia referred to the collection as a mystification.

== Legacy ==
During the Bulgarian National Revival, the collection became more popular abroad than among Bulgarian literary circles. The collection gained popularity in Bulgaria. Shishmanov called Veda Slovena "the first Bulgarian book, which succeeded in arousing a lively interest among the European scholarly world in Bulgaria and in its past". In 1967, Macedonian literary historian Gane Todorovski wrote that the collection is "the supreme monument of extreme national enthusiasm" and that it is part "the phase of romantic self-indulgence, the phase when in the mirror of national vanity, every gesture and move, every movement and recollection, every unspoken word acquires grandiose significance, a heroic pose, a historical act."

New interest in the collection appeared in the 1980s in Bulgaria, aligning with the national communist interest in cultural politics. A documentary about the collection was released in Bulgaria in 2012.

== See also ==
- Folk Songs of the Macedonian Bulgarians
- Ossian
