= Secret Macedonian Committee =

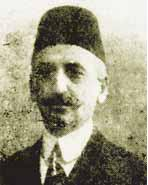
Temko Popov, one of the leaders of the society

The Secret Macedonian Committee (Macedonian: Таен македонски комитет, romanized: Taen makedonski komitet; Serbian: Тајни македонски комитет, Tajni makedonski komitet; TMK) was a secret organization established in 1885 or 1886 by Macedonian Slavs in Sofia, Bulgaria. It promoted а Slavic Macedonian identity, distinguished especially from the ethnic identity of the Bulgarians, the re-establishment of the Archbishopric of Ohrid as a separate entity from the Bulgarian Exarchate, the promotion of the Macedonian language, etc. Its leaders were Naum Evro(vić), Kosta Grupče(vić), Vasil Karajovev and Temko Popov(ić).

== History ==
The organization was established in 1885 or 1886 by Macedonian Slavs in Sofia, Bulgaria, operating illegally. It was anti-Bulgarian and its establishment marked the beginning of the pro-Serbian activities by its activists. According to the Bulgarian police, it had around 20 young people who promoted the idea of Macedonian separatism, especially that Macedonians were distinct from Bulgarians. Its leaders went to Belgrade in 1886, where they had negotiations with the Government of Serbia on collecting funds for the restoration of the Archbishopric of Ohrid and opening church-school communities, publishing a magazine Macedonian Voice in Macedonian in Constantinople (which would be against Bulgarian influence and pro-Ottoman), opening schools throughout Ottoman Macedonia and hiring teachers that would teach Macedonian, printing books in Macedonian, etc. These activists were educated in Serbia or at least under Serbian influence. In accordance with the Serbo-Macedonian cooperation in the same year in Constantinople, the Association of Serbo-Macedonians was founded. This compromise with the Serbian interests in Macedonia later led to abandonment of its separatist program altogether. The Bulgarian police discovered and disbanded TMK. Most of its members left Bulgaria and some went to Serbia. Those who went to Belgrade supported the Serbian policy. The Macedonian historiography has perceived the beginning of Macedonian separatism with TMK's activity.
