= Veselinka Malinska =

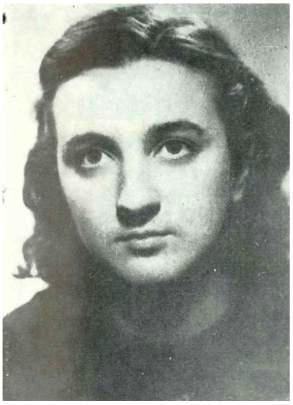

Veselinka Malinska (Kumanovo, Bulgarian occupation zone of Serbia, January 4, 1917 – Skopje, SFR Yugoslavia, November 12, 1987) was a Macedonian Communist, feminist, participant in World War II in Yugoslavia and prominent member of the Women's Antifascist Front of Macedonia.

She became a member of the League of Communists of Yugoslavia in 1936. After the beginning of the Communist resistance in Vardar Macedonia, Malinska came to the Bulgarian occupation zone in May 1942. As Secretary of the Regional Committee of Communists in Macedonia, after her verdict of Bulgarian military court in 1942, before joining the partisan detachments, she hid in Tanuševci and other villages in the Albanian occupation zone of Yugoslavia. She participated in the first session of the Anti-fascist Assembly for the National Liberation of Macedonia.

She was a director of Radio Skopje from April 1, 1952, to November 25, 1961.
