= Association of Serbo-Macedonians =

The Association of Serbo-Macedonians (Serbian: Друштво Србо-Македонаца; Macedonian: Друштво Србо-Македонци, romanized: Društvo Srbo-Makedonci), also known as Society of Serbo-Macedonians, was a group founded by intellectuals from the region of Macedonia in 1886, and based in Constantinople, Ottoman Empire. The association promoted the Serbian national cause in Ottoman Macedonia.

== History ==
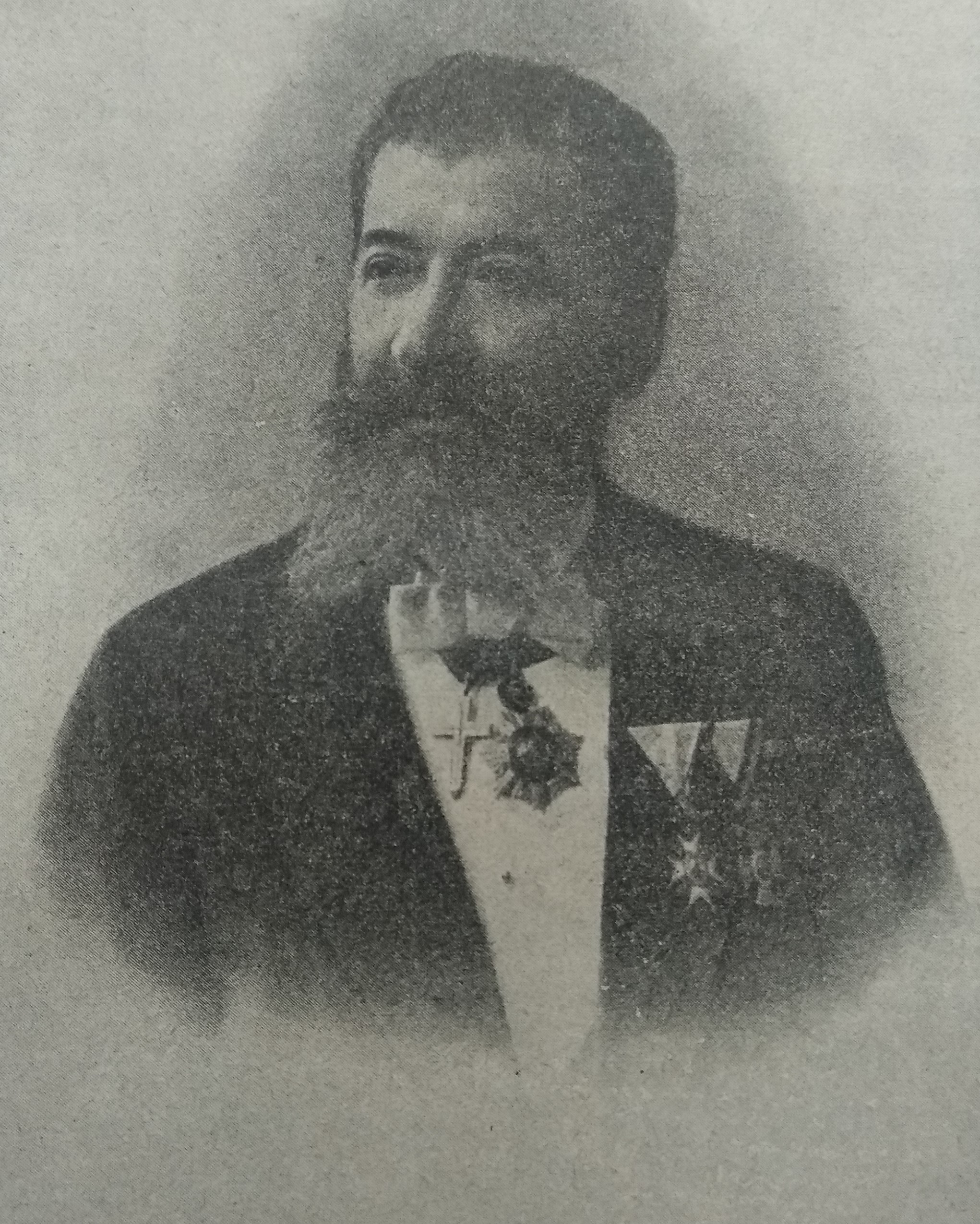
Kosta Grupčević, an activist of the association.

The founders of the association had all formerly been members of the Secret Macedonian Committee (SMC). SMC was founded by Slavic Macedonian expatriate students in Sofia, Principality of Bulgaria, but it was quickly uncovered by the Bulgarian authorities and disbanded. Four of its members left Bulgaria, and went to Belgrade, Kingdom of Serbia, to support Serbian policy. The first "Gathering of Serbo-Macedonians and Old Serbs" was held in Belgrade on February 23, 1885, where the participants requested the implementation of Serbian national policy in Ottoman Macedonia to protect Serbian national interests by the Serbian prime minister Milutin Garašanin.

Serbia tried to promote Macedonism as a stage towards the Serbianisation of the Macedonian Slavs. In Belgrade, the group's members met with the Serbian politician Stojan Novaković who pledged his support. The decision to create the association in Constantinople was taken at a meeting of the Serbian government in early August 1886. At the same meeting, a decision to create the Saint Sava Society was taken. Both had the purpose to promote Serbian propaganda in Ottoman Macedonia.

Novaković became the Serbian ambassador in Constantinople, where he met with two former SMC members, Kosta Grupčević and Naum Evrović, having established the association for the realisation of the Serbian cause. They were partially successful in imposing strong Serbian linguistic influence on Macedonian. Serbian schools were opened in the region of Macedonia, and books were printed in the Macedonian dialect with Serbian linguistic influence. The schools attempted to develop a middle road between Serbian and Bulgarian by teaching a combination of Serbian and Macedonian. The association provided scholarships for people who identified themselves as Serbo-Macedonians and conducted propaganda among Macedonian Slavs in Serbia. Due to its success, the association's executive body became part of the Serbian Ministry of Foreign Affairs.

== Programme ==
The programme of the association consisted of the following points:

- Protection of the interests of the Ottoman Empire;
- Printing of a newspaper (Macedonian Voice) in Constantinople in the "pure Macedonian language";
- Macedonian Slavs should abandon the Bulgarian Exarchate;
- Restoration of the Archbishopric of Ohrid (under the jurisdiction of the Ecumenical Patriarchate);
- Countering Bulgarian influence in Macedonia and reinforcing the Serbian influence;
- Expulsion of Bulgarian bishops and teachers;
- Opening of schools where teachers will use the local Macedonian vernacular;
- Replacement of the Bulgarian linguistic influence with the Serbian one (writing in the Serbian Cyrillic alphabet, following the rules of Serbian grammar and the replacement of Bulgarian phrases with Serbian ones).

== See also ==
- Macedonian Bulgarians
