= Naum Evro =

Ottoman pro-Serbian activist

Naum Evro (Serbian: Наум Евро; fl. 1871–1888) or Evrović, was a pro-Serbian activist in the Ottoman Empire. He is regarded by some to be among the first Macedonists. Evro was a founder and member of the anti-Bulgarian organization Secret Macedonian Committee.

== Life ==
Naum Evro was born in Struga, at the time part of the Ottoman Empire. He received primary education in his birthplace. In 1871, he (as "Naum Evrović from Struga in Old Serbia") petitioned the Ministry for Education and Church Affairs of Serbia to receive a stipend to attend school in the Principality of Serbia. Evro later was educated at the Theological School in Belgrade, after which he was appointed as an intern in the Vranje district. In Vranje, he, as many Serbs hailing south of the borders, associated with the Đinovski family that hailed from Galičnik. He also studied philology in Belgrade and learned French in Paris for a specialist degree for one year.

While working in the administration, he was "expelled" due to promoting a Serbian stance in the "Macedonian question" and moved to Sofia, allegedly "fleeing due to persecution". Along with Temko Popov(ić), Kosta Grupče(vić) and Vasil(ije) Karajovov(ić), he established the pro-Serbian and anti-Bulgarian Secret Macedonian Committee (TMK) in Sofia. Evro served as the secretary of TMK. He advocated for the restoration of the Archbishopric of Ohrid, the rejection of the Bulgarian Exarchate and the introduction of the Macedonian language in education and administration.

In August 1886, along with the other leaders of TMK, he attended negotiations with the Serbian government in Belgrade on collecting funds for the restoration of the Archbishopric of Ohrid and opening church-school communities, publishing a newspaper Macedonian Voice in Macedonian in Constantinople (which would be against Bulgarian influence and pro-Ottoman), opening schools throughout Ottoman Macedonia and hiring teachers that would teach Macedonian, printing books in Macedonian, etc.

In 1886, he became part of the Association of Serbo-Macedonians, headquartered in Constantinople, founded and led by Serbian politician Stojan Novaković, for the realization of the Serbian cause. Novaković was his sponsor. In early June 1887, Evro and Grupčević petitioned the Grand Vizier in allowing the publication of Makedonski glas ("Macedonian voice"), a magazine written in Macedonian dialect for Ottoman subjects in the region. In 1888, Evro and Grupčević translated Stevo Čuturilo's Serbian-language primer into the Brsjak–Mijak dialect of western Macedonia, and it became one of three potential basis for the Macedonian Primer (Makedonski bukvar) motioned by Novaković. The third suggestion, of Milojko Veselinović based on the Struma dialect of eastern Macedonia, was accepted in the end. In 1888, Bulgarian philologist Marin Drinov wrote to folklorist Kuzman Shapkarev that Evro "sold himself to the Serbs." Bulgarian Exarchate's secretary Atanas Shopov wrote that Evro made a request to be a Bulgarian teacher in Macedonia. Per Shopov, he returned to Struga ill.

== Legacy ==
He is regarded by some to be among the first "Macedonists".

== See also ==
- Despot Badžović
- Kosta Šumenković

== Annotations ==
1. In Ottoman documents, his name was Naum Evro. In Serbian, his name was written Naum Evrović (Serbian: Наум Евровић), which is how he spelt his own name. Another spelling was Naum Jevrović (Наум Јевровић).

== Sources ==
- Džambazovski, Kliment (1983). Građa za istoriju makedonskog naroda iz Arhiva Srbije: knj. 1. 1868-1873. Arhiv Srbije.
- Džambazovski, Kliment (1965). "Stojan Novaković i makedonizam". Историјски Часопис. 14–15. Istorijski institut.
- Hadži-Vasiljević, Jovan (1928). Prosvetne i politicke prilike u juznim srpskim oblastima u XIX V.: do srpsko-turskih ratova 1876-78.
- Jagodić, Miloš (2011). "Планови o политици Србије према Старој Србији и Македонији (1878-1885)". Историјски Часопис. 60: 435–460.
- Šešum, Uroš (2020). "Српске школе и учитељи у Старој Србији и Македонији у Великој источној кризи". Јован Ристић, Државник И Дипломата-Берлински Конгрес-(140 Година Од Међународног Признања И Независности Србије): 147–200.
- Vučetić, Biljana (2012). Наша ствар у Османском царству [Our Issue in the Ottoman Empire]. Istorijski institut. ISBN 978-86-7743-095-5.
