= Kosta Grupčević =

Serbian newspaper editor and publisher

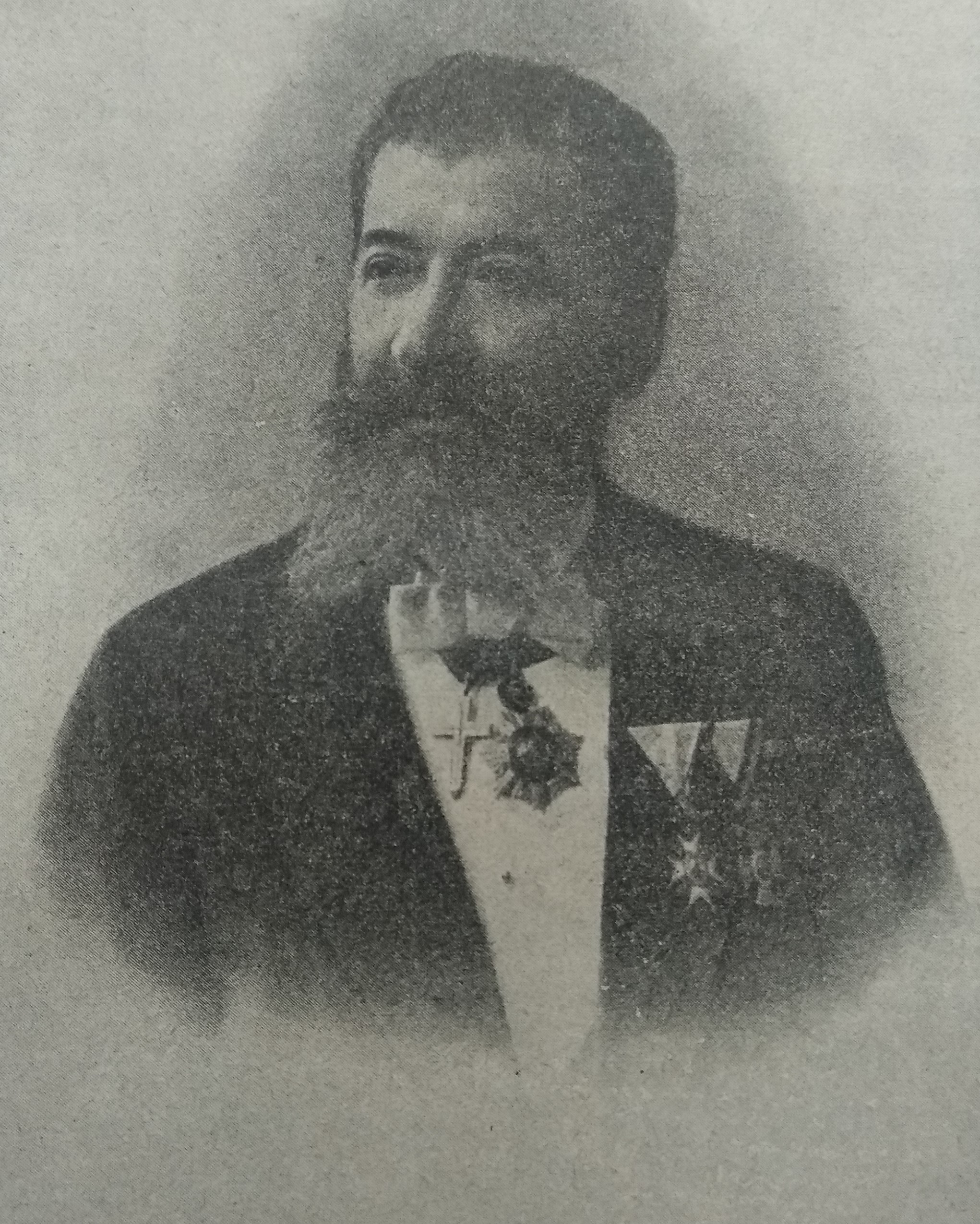

Kosta Grupče(vić) (Macedonian: Коста Групче(виќ); Serbian: Коста Групче(вић); 1849–1907) was a Serbian newspaper editor, publisher and translator. He was among the first Macedonists, a founder and leader of the Secret Macedonian Committee, and later promoted Serbian interests.

== Life ==
He was born in Ohrid, Ottoman Empire, in 1849. Grupčević was part of the Ottoman Macedonian upper-middle class. He received his primary education in his hometown as a student of Grigor Parlichev, who became his close friend. Grupčević was a member of the Ohrid Educational and Students Society "Saint Clement". He developed a vague sense of Macedonianness, as a supra-national identity. Historians do not know when exactly Grupčević came into contact with Serbian diplomatic circles or an official Serbian agenda. Along with Temko Popov(ić), Naum Evro(vić) and Vasil(ije) Karajovov(ić), he established and led the anti-Bulgarian Secret Macedonian Committee (SMC) in Sofia. The establishment of SMC marked the beginning of the pro-Serbian activities by its activists. He was among the first Macedonists. In August 1886, along with the other leaders of SMC, he attended negotiations with the Serbian government in Belgrade on collecting funds for the restoration of the Archbishopric of Ohrid and opening church-school communities, publishing a newspaper Macedonian Voice in Macedonian in Constantinople (which would be against Bulgarian influence and pro-Ottoman), opening schools throughout Ottoman Macedonia and hiring teachers that would teach Macedonian, printing books in Macedonian, etc. Later, he switched from the vague sense of Macedonianness to Serbian nationhood.

Grupčević was close to Stojan Novaković, Serbia's ambassador in Constantinople, who was also his sponsor. In 1886, he became part of the Association of Serbo-Macedonians, headquartered in Constantinople, founded and led by Novaković, for the realization of the Serbian cause. Grupčević settled in Constantinople. Along with Evro, he assisted Novaković, being partially successful in imposing strong Serbian linguistic influence on Macedonian. In 1887, Grupčević tried to publish the newspaper titled Macedonian Voice in Constantinople to promote Serbian interests, but was not permitted to do so. With Serbian support, along with the rest of SMC's leaders, he tried to publish the newspaper Macedonian Leaf in Macedonian in Constantinople on 26 July 1887.

Bulgarian national activist Kuzman Shapkarev wrote in a letter to Marin Drinov on 10 September 1888 about him and Temko Popov: "Temko Popov and Kosta Grubchev [i.e. Grupčević] - today these two gnaw the bones of the Serbian embassy in Constantinople, lying that they will turn the Macedonian Bulgarians into old Serbs." Shapkarev also referred to him as "worthless, vile and despicable." According to Atanas Shopov, who served as a secretary of the Bulgarian Exarchate in Constantinople, Grupčević propagated that the Slavs in Macedonia were Serbs and Bulgarians as much as they are Russians, Czechs or Poles. Per Shopov, Grupčević also claimed also that the Macedonians were a perfectly separate Slavic nationality, descendants of Alexander the Great, with a glorious past and a great history. However, per Shopov, Grupčević did not dare to preach openly that the Bulgarian element in Macedonia was Serbian, because he knew that every local would laugh at him.

In 1888, together with Evro, he prepared the Macedonian Primer, in Macedonian, under the influence of the Serbian language. It was sent to Belgrade for evaluation in June 1888. However, the primer was not accepted due to relying predominantly on Macedonian, thus the primer by Milojko Veselinović was accepted and published instead. Per Macedonian linguist Trajko Stamatoski, their primer was declined because it did not comply with Novaković's instructions. From August 1892, Grupčević was in charge of the central Serbian bookshop in Constantinople, distributing Serbian books. In 1895, he became the editor of the Serbian newspaper Carigradski glasnik, which was published in standard Serbian and promoted Serbian ideas. In 1897, he became the owner of the newspaper. Grupčević also collaborated with the newspapers Golub, Zornica and Novini. He authored the tourist guide book About Ohrid and Lake Ohrid, published on 1 January 1900 in Constantinople. Grupčević worked as a translator for Greek language at the Serbian embassy in Constantinople. He was a recipient of the Order of St. Sava and Order of the Medjidie Third Class. Grupčević died in poverty in Constantinople on 3 February 1907.
