= List of people from Prilep =

Below is a list of notable people born in Prilep, North Macedonia, or its surroundings:

- Ipče Ahmedovski, singer
- Gregory Akindynos, theologian
- Ezgjan Alioski, football player
- Metodija Andonov-Čento, first president of ASNOM and of the Socialist Republic of Macedonia
- Mirče Acev, organizer of the Yugoslav communist resistance in Vardar Macedonia
- Vera Aceva, communist
- George Atanasoski, politician and founder of several companies
- Georgi Atsev, revolutionary
- Atanas Badev, composer
- Kole Čašule, dramatist
- Marko Cepenkov, folklorist
- Matea Churlinovska, handballer
- Krste Crvenkovski, communist politician
- Kuzman Josifovski Pitu, communist partisan
- Haris Hajradinović, football player
- Blaže Koneski, poet, writer, literary translator, linguistic scholar (codification of standard Macedonian)
- Gorančo Koteski, army officer
- Tamara Kotevska, filmmaker
- Prince Marko, ruler of Prilep
- Ilčo Naumoski, football player
- Petar Naumoski, former basketball player and current politician
- Mile Nedelkoski, writer
- Jane Nikolovski, football goalkeeper
- Dositej Novaković, Orthodox bishop
- Ali Fethi Okyar, diplomat and politician
- Ordan Petlevski, artist
- Elena Petreska, pop singer
- Gjorče Petrov, leader of the Internal Macedonian-Adrianople Revolutionary Organization (IMARO)
- Petar Popović, architect
- Toše Proeski, musician
- Goce Sedloski, football player, defender
- Metodi Shatorov, communist
- Mihail Solunov, journalist and monk
- Ljubica Štefan, historian
- Vlatko Stefanovski, ethno-rock jazz fusion guitar player
- Dimitar Talev, writer
- Borko Temelkovski, communist
- Elena Velevska, turbo folk and popular music singer
- Petar Zdravkovski, educator, statesman, diplomat
