= Petar Atsev =

Bulgarian revolutionary (1877–1939)

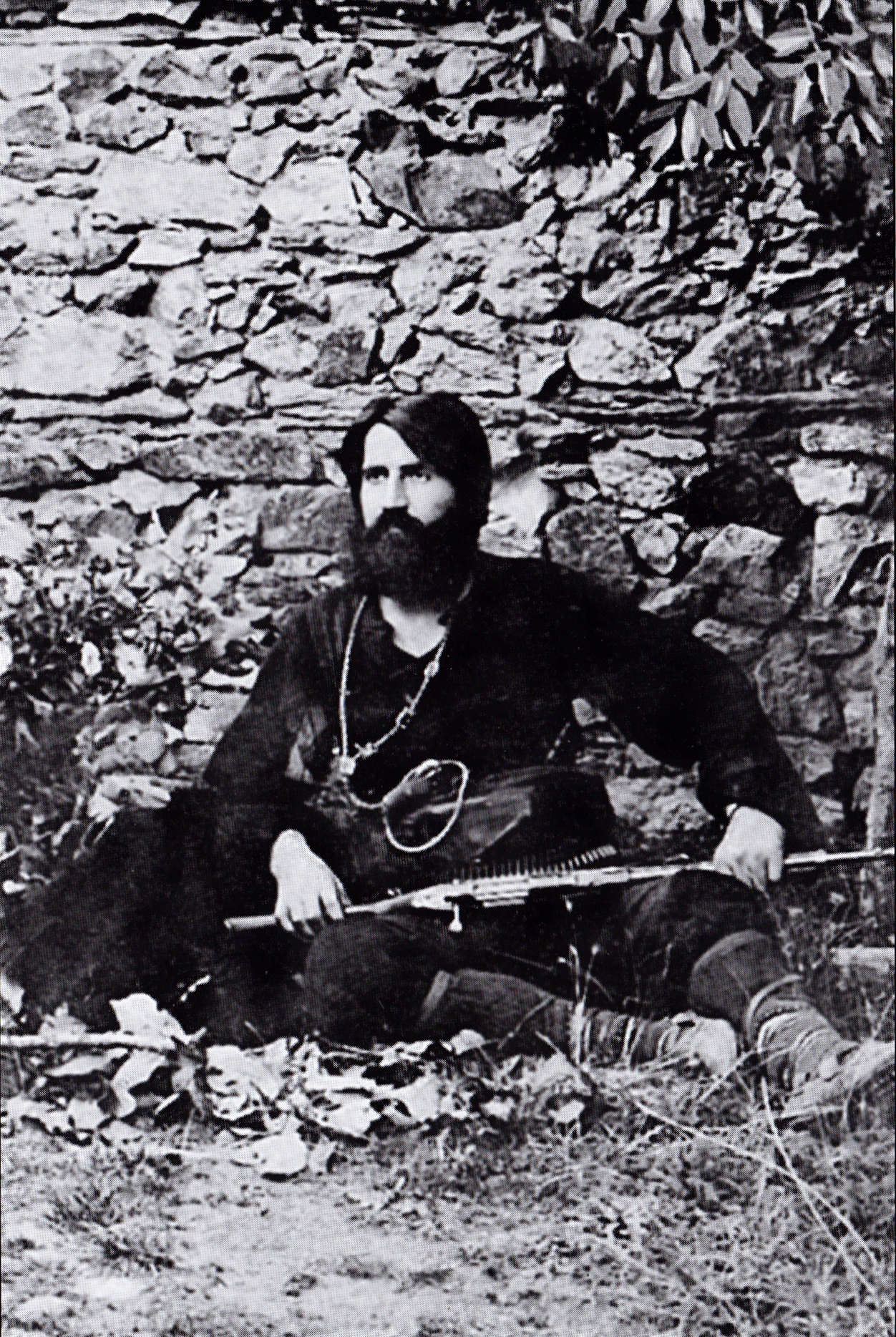
- A photograph of Petar Atsev
- Born: 7 June 1877; Oreovec, Manastir Vilayet, Ottoman Empire (present-day North Macedonia)
- Died: 20 April 1939 (aged 61); Plovdiv, Bulgaria
- Organization: the IMARO

Petar Atsev (Bulgarian: Петър Ацев, Macedonian: Петар Ацев; 1877–1939) was a Macedonian Bulgarian revolutionary, and a voyvoda of the Internal Macedonian-Adrianople Revolutionary Organization (IMARO) for the region of Prilep. He worked as a Bulgarian teacher.

== Biography ==
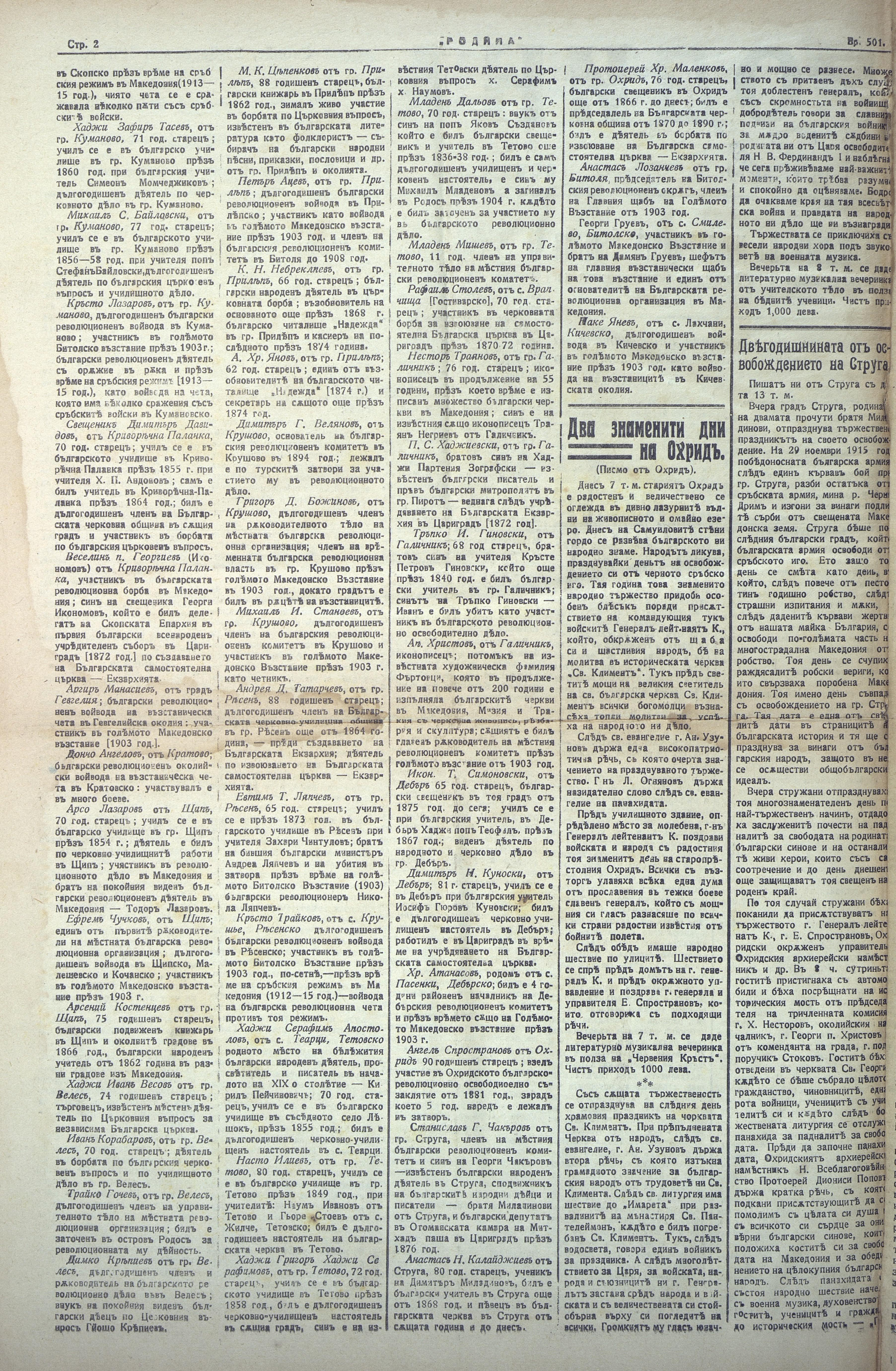
Page 2 of the protest memoir of the Macedonian Bulgarians signed by Atsev (Rodina newspaper, Skopje; 27 December 1917).

Petar Atsev was born in 1877 in the village of Oreovec, then part of the Manastir Vilayet of the Ottoman Empire. From 1897 to 1901, he worked as a teacher in Prilep and Kruševo as well as in some villages in Macedonia. Together with his brothers Mirche and Georgi, he joined the revolutionary activity of the IMARO.

In 1901, Krastyu Germov, later known as Shakir voyvoda, became a member of his revolutionary band. At the beginning of 1902, Petar also became a freedom fighter, and in May 1902, he became a regional voyvoda for the Prilep region. Atanas Ivanov was then a member of his band. Petar Atsev was a representative of the Prilep revolutionary region at the Congress of Smilevo, where he was one of the principal antagonists to the idea of organizing and carrying out the Ilinden-Preobrazhenie Uprising. To explain his opposition to the Uprising, he emphasized the lack of armaments and ammunition in his revolutionary region. Petar Atsev, together with Georgi Pophristov and Lazar Poptraykov, was chosen a reserve member of the Uprising Staff, which was led by Dame Gruev, Atanas Lozanchev and Boris Sarafov.

After the end of the Ilinden-Preobrazhenie Uprising, Petar was chosen as an illegal member of the regional committee together with Pavel Hristov and Pando Klyashev. Milan Matov, Petar Neshev and Mihail Rakadzhiev were the legal members of this committee. Petar Atsev fought a number of battles against Turkish military units and Serbian and Greek bands in Macedonia. On 28 June 1904 the revolutionary bands of Petar Atsev and Nikola Karandzhulov, had a battle against a Turkish military unit near "Kyuleto", a place in the vicinity of the village of Selce, in which Nikola Karandzhulov was killed. In 1905, Trayko Kralya, Petar Atsev and Gyore Spirkov, nicknamed Lenishtanets, and Krastyo Germov had a meeting with Gligor Sokolovich, who used false documents to persuade them to let him enter Macedonia.

At the Congress of Kyustendil in 1906, Petar Atsev was chosen an additional member of the Central Committee of the IMARO, together with Petko Penchev, Pavel Hristov, Efrem Chuchkov, Argir Manasiev and Stamat Ikonomov. In 1907, he participated in the Battle of "Nozhot" (the Knife), together with the voyvodas Tane Nikolov, Ivan Naumov, Mihail Chakov, Hristo Tsvetkov and Mircho Naydov.

After the Young Turk Revolution in 1908, he was no longer an illegal freedom fighter and settled in Prilep. Two years later, he was arrested and for 15 months he was imprisoned in different prisons in Macedonia and Anatolia. He was released in the middle of 1911 and settled in Plovdiv, Bulgaria. He participated as a Bulgarian Army volunteer in the Balkan Wars, and also later in the First World War. Petar Atsev was a member of the Ilinden Organization. After the establishment of IMRO (United), an attempt was made to attract him to the organization, but Atsev refused. He died in 1939 in Plovdiv. On the occasion of his death, the revolutionary Lazar Tomov wrote an obituary on behalf of the Ilinden organization in the magazine Illustration Ilinden, which among other things reads: On April 20 of this year the almost life-long chairman of the congress bureau of the Ilinden Organization was commemorated in the city of Plovdiv. On the same day, the radio broadcast the sad news of the death of the great Bulgarian and fighter for the freedom of Macedonia to all corners of the Bulgarian lands.
