= Oreovec =

Oreovec may refer to:

- Oreovec, Makedonski Brod, North Macedonia
- Oreovec, Prilep, North Macedonia
