= Mirche Atsev =

Bulgarian revolutionary

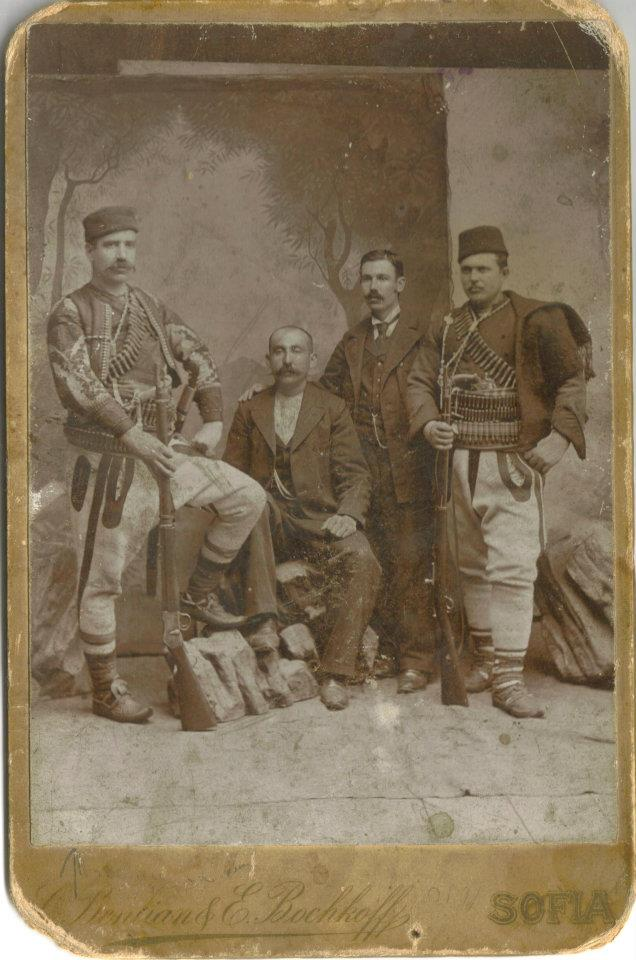
- Atsev (standing in left) with comrades in Sofia.
- Born: 1859; Oreovec, Ottoman Empire (modern North Macedonia)
- Died: 1901 (aged 41–42); Ulanci, Ottoman Empire (modern North Macedonia)
- Organization: IMARO

Mirche Atsev (Bulgarian: Мирче Ацев), or Mirče Acev, nicknamed Orovchanets, was a Bulgarian revolutionary from Ottoman Macedonia, a leader of an Internal Macedonian-Adrianople Revolutionary Organization (IMARO) revolutionary band.

== Biography ==
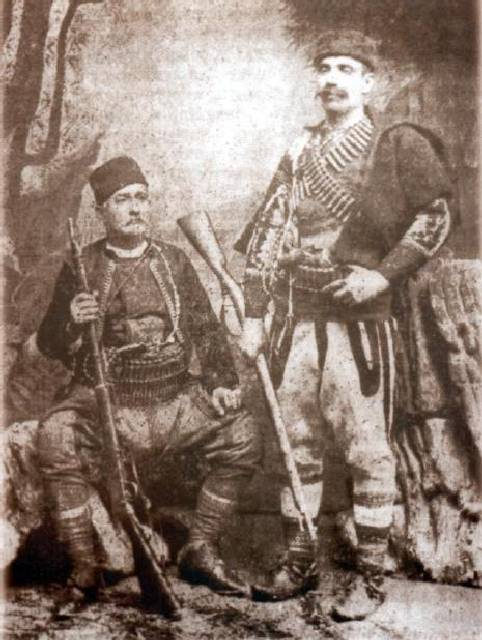
Mirche Atsev standing

Mirche Atsev was born in 1859 in the village of Oreovec in the Prilep district, then part of the Ottoman Empire. He was named after his father, Mirche Atsev, who was a well-known voyvoda. He schooled himself in Prilep and then he worked as a shepherd. After Turks murdered his father, he joined the Hayduk's band of Kone Pavlov in 1885. However, in the next year, he was arrested and imprisoned in Solun. After having escaped from the prison, Atsev moved to Bulgaria. During his stay in Sofia, he was accused of involvement in the murder of Stefan Stambolov, as a result of which he was imprisoned for three years in the Black Mosque, (now Sveti Sedmochislenitsi Church). In Sofia, together with his brothers Petar and Georgi, he joined the revolutionary activity of the IMARO against the Turkish authorities. In 1899, Atsev entered with a revolutionary band into Ottoman Macedonia, in the region of Nevrokop. Later, he was a voyvoda in the region in Prilep. In 1901, on the way to the village of Ulanci, in the Tikveš region, his band was chased and crushed by a Turkish military detachment. Mirche Atsev died in this battle.

The Macedonian partisan Mirče Acev was a nephew of Mirche Atsev, on his brothers' side.

== Sources ==
- Енциклопедия България, том 1, Издателство на БАН, София, 1978.
- Кратка биография на Мирче Ацев
