= Mirče Acev =

Macedonian organizer of the Yugoslav communist resistance in Vardar Macedonia during WW2

- Мирче Ацев
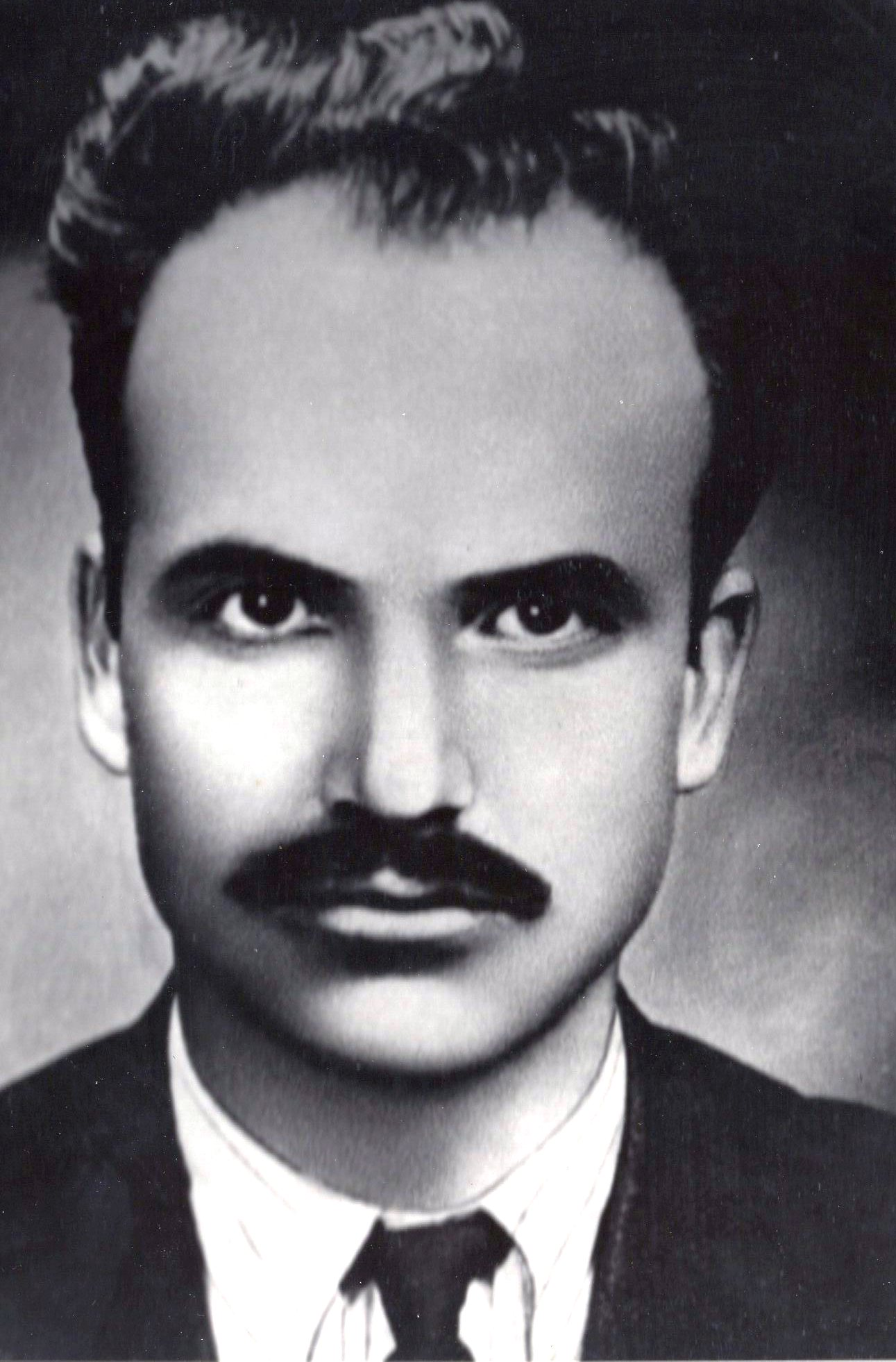
- Born: 20 October 1915; Prilep, Kingdom of Serbia
- Died: 4 January 1943 (aged 27); Skopje, Kingdom of Bulgaria

Mirče Acev (Macedonian: Мирче Ацев; 20 October 1915 – 4 January 1943) was a Macedonian organizer of the Yugoslav communist resistance in Vardar Macedonia during World War II. He graduated from the University of Belgrade Faculty of Law in Kingdom of Yugoslavia. During World War II in Yugoslav Macedonia he became a leader of the Regional Committee of Communists in Macedonia and was declared postmortally a People's Hero of Yugoslavia, on 29 July 1945.

== Biography ==
He was born in 1915 in Prilep, in the Kingdom of Serbia, during the Bulgarian invasion during the First World War. He was named after his uncle Mirche Atsev a IMRO revolutionary. His sister Vera Aceva, also participated in the World War II in Yugoslav Macedonia and was declared a Yugoslav national hero. After graduating from the primary four-grade school in Oreovec, he went to study at a high school in Prilep. He was forced to drop out of school in Prilep due to the policy of the regime of Petar Živković, that is to close all the high schools, except in Skopje, Bitola and Štip. Mirče went to Bitola and in the school year of 1933/1934 he enrolled in the fifth grade in the Bitola high school. He graduated in the summer of 1937.

He then enrolled at the Faculty of Law in Belgrade. From the very beginning of his studies he joined the organization of advanced students. Through this organization, run by the CPY, advanced students took over various professional associations, boards, and the student canteen. He became friends with Kuzman Josifovski - Pitu, and his friendship with Strašo Pindžur also dates back to those days.

He became a member of the Communist Party of Yugoslavia in 1939. He was also responsible for the organization and management of the student colony in Ohrid. In the summer of 1939 he formed the first party organization and the first local committee of the CPY in the city. He was the head of the colony in Ohrid in the following 1940. In the beginning of 1940 he was sent to work illegally in Skopje and until 6 April 1941 he stayed in the city. There he organized the Provincial Committee and together with Strašo Pindžur prepared the printing of the party materials, the newspaper "Iskra".

From the very beginning of the Bulgarian occupation he joined the Yugoslav communist resistance movement. A few days after the attack of Nazi Germany, he and Strašo left for Kavadarci, and then Mirče moved to Prilep. After a short time he returned to work in the Provincial Committee in Skopje. As a party instructor of the Provincial Committee, he toured the party organizations in several cities in Macedonia.

From the end of 1941 until the spring of 1942, Mirče Acev resided in Bitola. Although in deep illegality, he worked with organizations in Resen and Ohrid. In meetings with leading figures and in letters, Mirče criticized the inaction of the Provincial Committee, which had an impact on the change in its composition in the spring of 1942. In June of that year he became interim secretary of the Provincial Committee. Together with Kuzman Josifovski - Pitu, he advocates the application of the course for armed struggle and approaches the formation of several new partisan detachments in Macedonia. However, in a letter from August 9, 1942 to the Central Committee of the Yugoslav Communist Party, he admitted that the Macedonian people had not yet outlived their illusions of liberation and continued to trust the Bulgarian authorities.

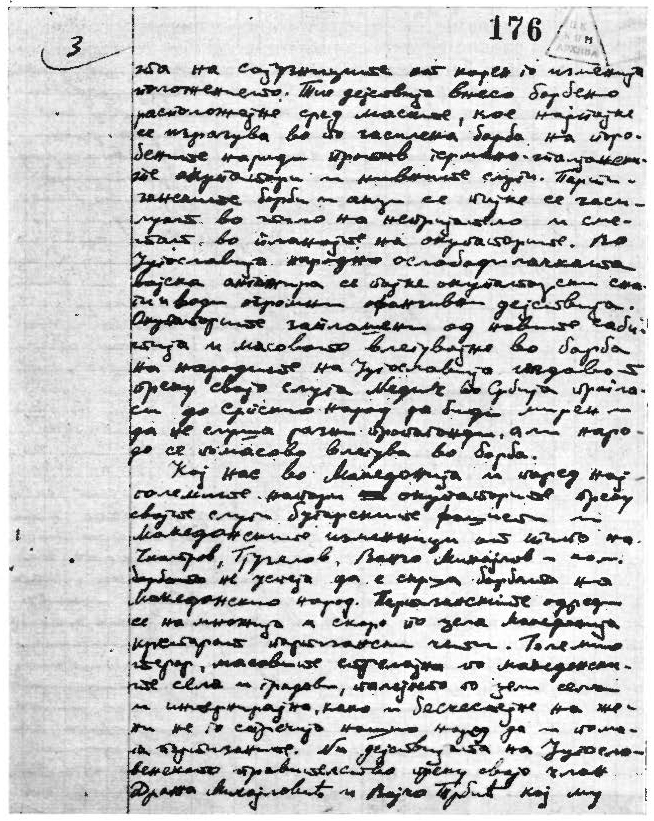
Handwritten letter from Mirče Acev, from 30 November 1942.

In a letter sent by Mirče Acev to Ljupčo Arsov (who was then interned), written on 30 November 1942, he describes the plight of the population, the physical terror, and point out that there was psychological terror from local Bulgarians, led by Dimitar Chkatrov, Dimitar Gyuzelov, etc. close to Ivan Mihailov. The manuscript letter preserved by Mirče Acev was written in an alphabet close to the Macedonian alphabet, which was formalized in 1945. The letter is kept in the archives of INI, arch. No. 176.

== Death ==
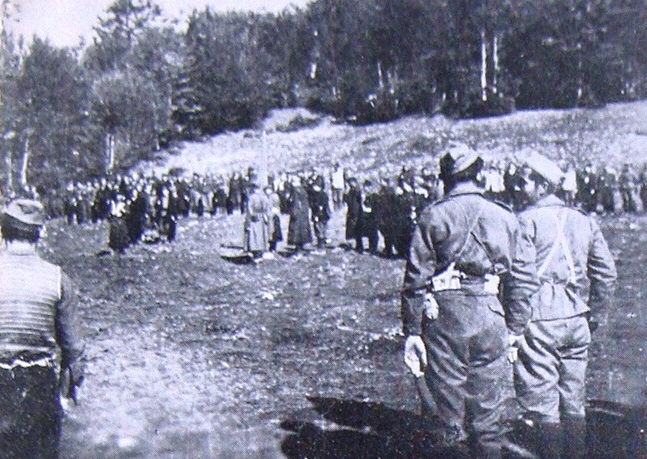
The first battalion of the Macedonian communist partisans, formed on 18 July 1943, was named after Mirče Acev.

Together with Strašo Pindžur in September 1942, they went to visit the partisan detachments and party organizations in Veles and Prilep region. He was accidentally arrested on December 19, 1942 in Veles, together with Strašo Pindžur. He was transferred from Veles to the infamous Skopje police prison. Direct testimonies about the torture and murder of Mirče Acev are given by the head of the Bulgarian state security Ljubomir Jordanov.

"He refused to give any information about his activity, so we beat him to extort recognition from him. On several occasions he was severely beaten on the soles. His legs were terribly swollen... I wondered how he could bear so much beating without saying a word. He was the most tortured prisoner, and he proved to be the strongest, as well. He could barely walk and told me that he could no longer feel anything in his legs because they had been beaten. During all the time he was beaten, he did not shout, did not utter a single word. Around 6 pm, Hristo Stoilov and Vasil Tsankov and I were sitting in Tsankov's office. It was at that time that agent Krum Pankov came and addressed Tsankov with the following words:

"Mr. Chief, Mirče Acev is in a very difficult position, he is dying." Then Tsankov said: "Okay, go there."

When Krum Pankov came out, Tsankov told me: "Tell Simeonov (director of the District Police) that he killed himself. We did that."

Per Yugoslav communist era sources containing the testimony by the Bulgarian police officers, after a long period of physical torture at the Skopje District Police Headquarters and without a trial, after five days of brutal torture, both he and Strašo Pindžur were thrown out of the windows of the police station by the Bulgarian police on 4 January 1943. Per Bechev, he committed suicide jumping from a Police station's window on 4 January 1943. After the news of the martyrdom of Mirče Acev and Strašo Pindžur, their comrades issued a leaflet-letter on the occasion of their murder, in which they expressed in detail their clear aspirations for the struggle for freedom of the Macedonian people. They also describe their heroic families, as families that fought for the freedom of Macedonia and the preservation of the ideals and the path set by the Ilinden revolutionaries. A small part of the letter describes the terror and the horrible image of their bodies:

"...How many thousands of honest Macedonians "lost their hair" when they saw Mirče's body in the hospital morgue, and in Prilep when they buried him with severed fingers, nails and torn flesh from the bones. Macedonian mothers, fathers and sisters have seen their sons and brothers tortured and beaten, but so far they have not seen such brutal and inhuman torture. Torture made by like Hitler and the Bulgarian fascists, cannot be compared not even to the torture of the Turkish janissaries, bashibozluci and krdzali. While they hid the Pindzur's body, so that his broken bones could not be seen, because they have learned from Mirče's case, that they've became mortification in the eyes of the people."

In honor of Mirče Acev, the first battalion of the Macedonian Partisans, formed on 18 July 1943, was named after him. In his honor and in honor of Strašo Pindžur, the songs "Ajde ke te prašam, bre Donke“ and „Vardare gord, podzapri“ were sung. Today many objects, streets, schools including the army garrison in the city of Prilep, are named after him.
