= Vera Aceva =

Macedonian communist and Yugoslavian national hero

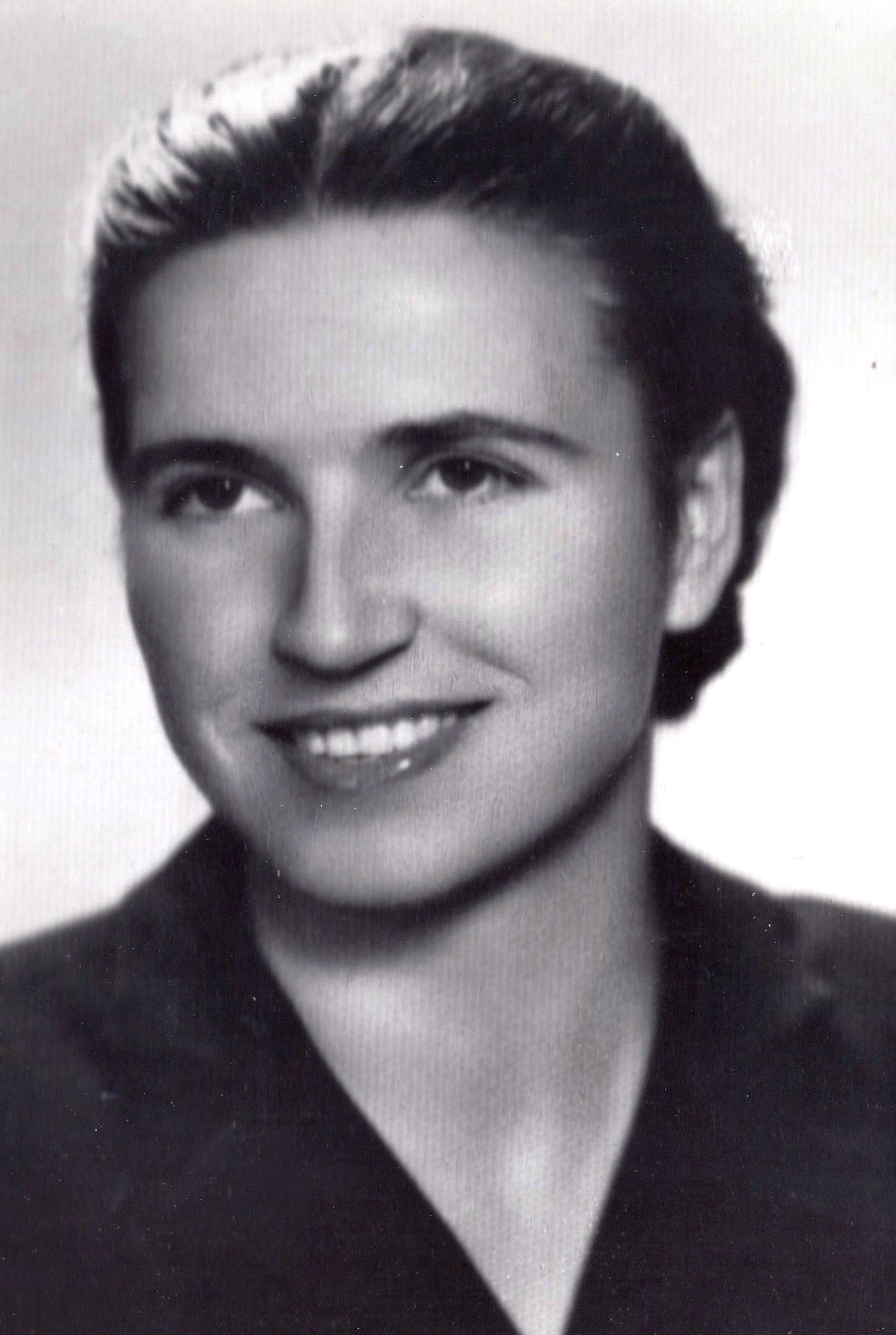
Vera Aceva

Vera Aceva-Dosta (November 24, 1919 – November 10, 2006) was a Macedonian communist, participant in the World War II in Yugoslavia and a national hero of Socialist Federal Republic of Yugoslavia (SFRY).

Authorization and directives to Vera Aceva given by Presidium of ASNOM.

== Early life and interwar period ==
Vera Aceva was born in 1919 in the village Oreovec, near Prilep. Her brother was Mirče Acev. Facing a difficult financial situation, Aceva had to cease her education after her second year of gymnasium and to find work, eventually finding employment in the tobacco industry.

Aceva joined the labor movement when she was 16 years old and became a member of the League of Communists of Yugoslavia in early 1940. In September of the same year, at the provincial conference she was elected as a member of the Regional Committee of the League of Communists of Yugoslavia for Macedonia. From September 1940 to November 1941, she was the Secretary of the Local Committee in Prilep.

== World War II in Yugoslavia ==
Aceva was one of the first organizers of the Prilep Partisan Detachment. In early 1942 she worked in the League of Communists of Yugoslavia in Skopje, then as a party instructor in Strumica, Bitola and Štip. In August 1943 she became the commissioner of the Shar detachment, and when on 11 November 1943 the First Macedonian-Kosovo Brigade was formed, Aceva was elected deputy political commissar. She was at this position until January 1944 when she became the political secretary of the Third and Fourth District Committee of the League of Communists of Macedonia. In August 1944 she participated in the first session of the Anti-fascist Assembly for the National Liberation of Macedonia, at which she was selected in its presidium.

== After liberation ==
In the 1945 Yugoslavian parliamentary election, Aceva was elected as a member of the Constitutional Assembly as part of 22 women out a total of 537 deputies. After liberation Aceva performed in more managerial positions. In 1948 she was the Mayor of the City of Skopje. At the Fifth Congress of the Communist Party of Yugoslavia in July 1948 she was elected to the Central Committee of the League of Communists of Yugoslavia. In March 1949, during the reconstruction of the People's Republic of Macedonia government, she was elected as Minister of Agriculture. She was then a member of the Federal Executive Council, Member of Parliament in more of the convocations of the People's Republic of Macedonia and SFRY.

In 1960 Aceva came into conflict with the then-Secretary of the Communist Party of Macedonia Lazar Koliševski, accusing him of making decisions together with Vidoe Smilevski - Bato outside of the Executive Committee of the League of Communists of Macedonia. At the meeting on 18 October 1960 Aleksandar Rankovic came from Belgrade, and stood on the side of Koliševski. Aceva was forced to retreat and moved to work in Belgrade.

In 1991 she published the book Letter to Svetozar Vukmanovik - Tempo.
