= Ilinden (organization) =

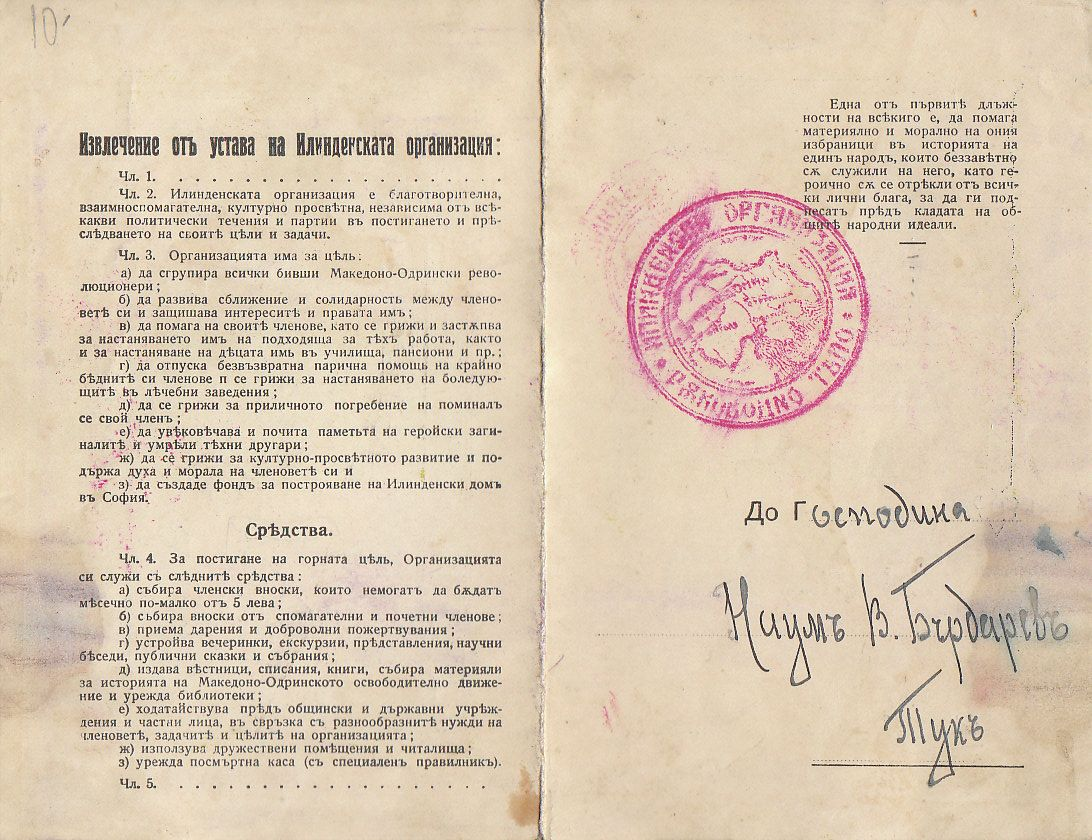
Еxcerpt from Statute of the Ilinden organization.

Ilinden was a veteran unpolitical organization established in Sofia in 1921 with branches in the whole of Bulgaria.

== History ==
=== Founding ===
It was founded by leaders of the former Internal Macedonian Adrianople Revolutionary Organization, who did not participate into the new Internal Macedonian Revolutionary Organization (IMRO) founded by Todor Alexandrov after the First World War. It supported the creation of a federal Macedonian state within a future Balkan Federation, which concept was similar to the ideas proclaimed by the Balkan Communist Federation at that time.

=== Role ===
In 1924 Alexandrov several times spoke with Petar Atsev, then president of the organization, on the occasion of a growing communist propaganda among its members. In 1924 Aleksandrov was killed, but as participants in the conspiracy against him were suspected the leaders of the Ilinden organization. Subsequently, many of them became victims of the Gorna Dzhumaya events and the subsequent fratricidal killings among the IMRO factions. In the following years, the Ilinden organization was primarily engaged in cultural and educational activities.

=== Disestablishment ===
The organization was formally dissolved after the military coup d'état from 19 May 1934, but it continued its existence. After the accession of most of the Vardar Macedonia to Bulgaria in April 1941, the organization created there its branches. After the coup d'état from 9 September 1944 a new leadership was elected, loyal to the Communist government.

On 15 June 1947 the communist authorities disbanded the organization.

== See also ==
- Macedonian Bulgarians

== Sources ==
- "История на България - електронна енциклопедия", ИК Труд, (Илинденска организация) (in Bulgarian)
