= Nebregovo =

Nebregovo Небрегово
- Village
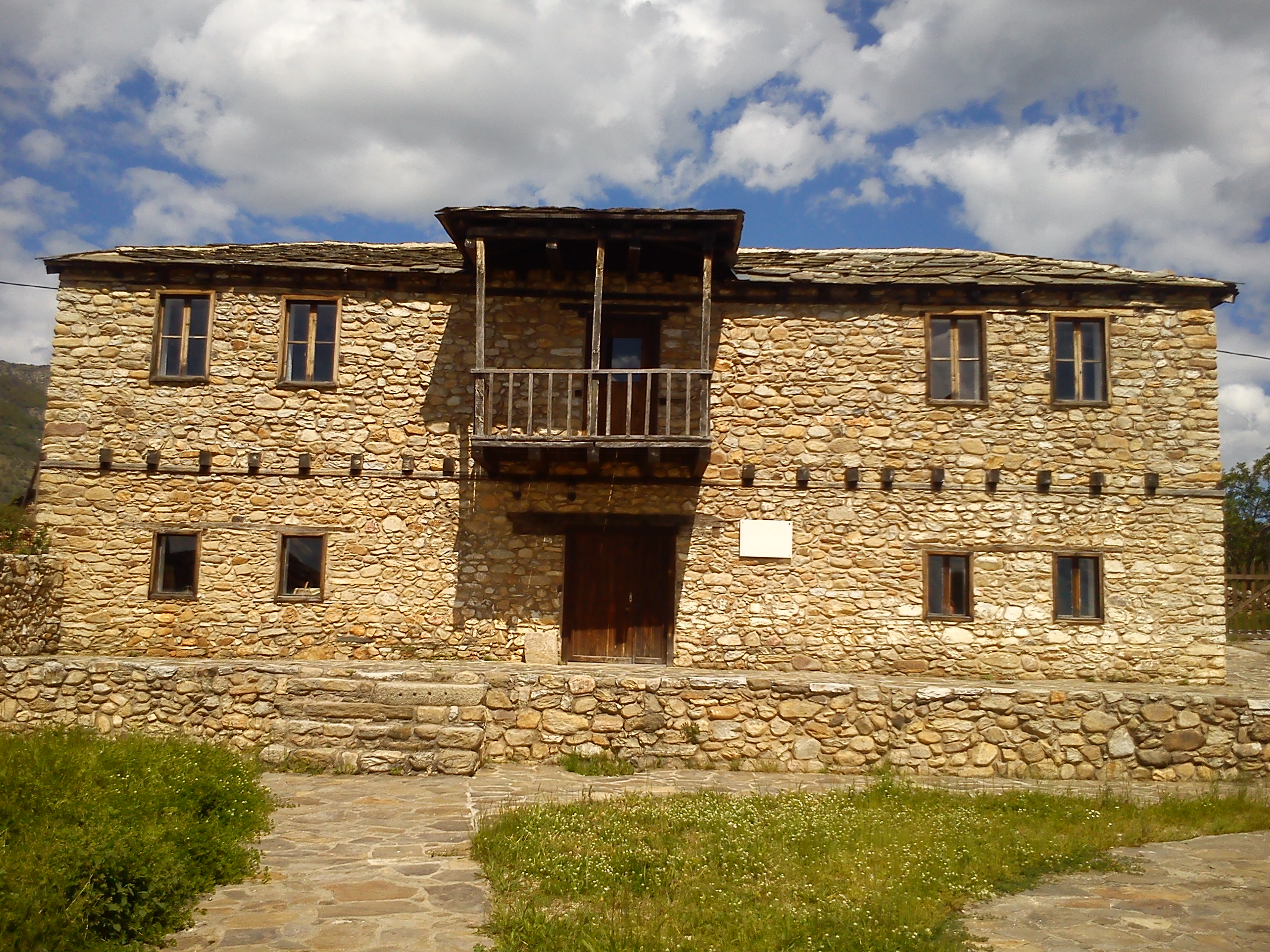
- Blaže Koneski's birthplace, now a memorial house

- Location within North Macedonia
- Country: North Macedonia
- Region: Pelagonia
- Municipality: Dolneni
- Elevation: 710 m (2,330 ft)

Population (2021)
  - Total: 118
- Time zone: UTC+1 (CET)
- Area code: +38948

Nebregovo (Macedonian: Небрегово) is a village in the municipality of Dolneni, North Macedonia.

== History ==
Toponyms such as Arbanasi, literally meaning "Albanians", as well as toponyms referring to the presence of Latins such as Latinska Crkva - Latin Church, or Latinski Grobišta- Latin Graves are found in Nebregovo. The well-known poet and linguist Blaže Koneski considers the latter to be nothing more but churches and tombs of a former Catholic Albanian population in the village, with Latini representing a term used by Orthodox Slavs to refer to Catholic Albanians.

== Demographics ==
According to the 2021 census, the village had a total of 118 inhabitants. Ethnic groups in the village include:

- Macedonians 105
- Others 13

Year	Macedonian	Albanian	Turks	Romani	Vlachs	Serbs	Bosniaks	Persons for whom data are taken from admin. sources	Total
2002	156	...	...	...	...	...	...	...	156
2021	105	...	...	...	...	...	...	13	118

== Notable people ==
- Blaže Koneski (1921-1993), poet
- Gligor Sokolović (1872-1910), Chetnik leader
