= Georgi Atsev =

Bulgarian revolutionary (1884–1906)

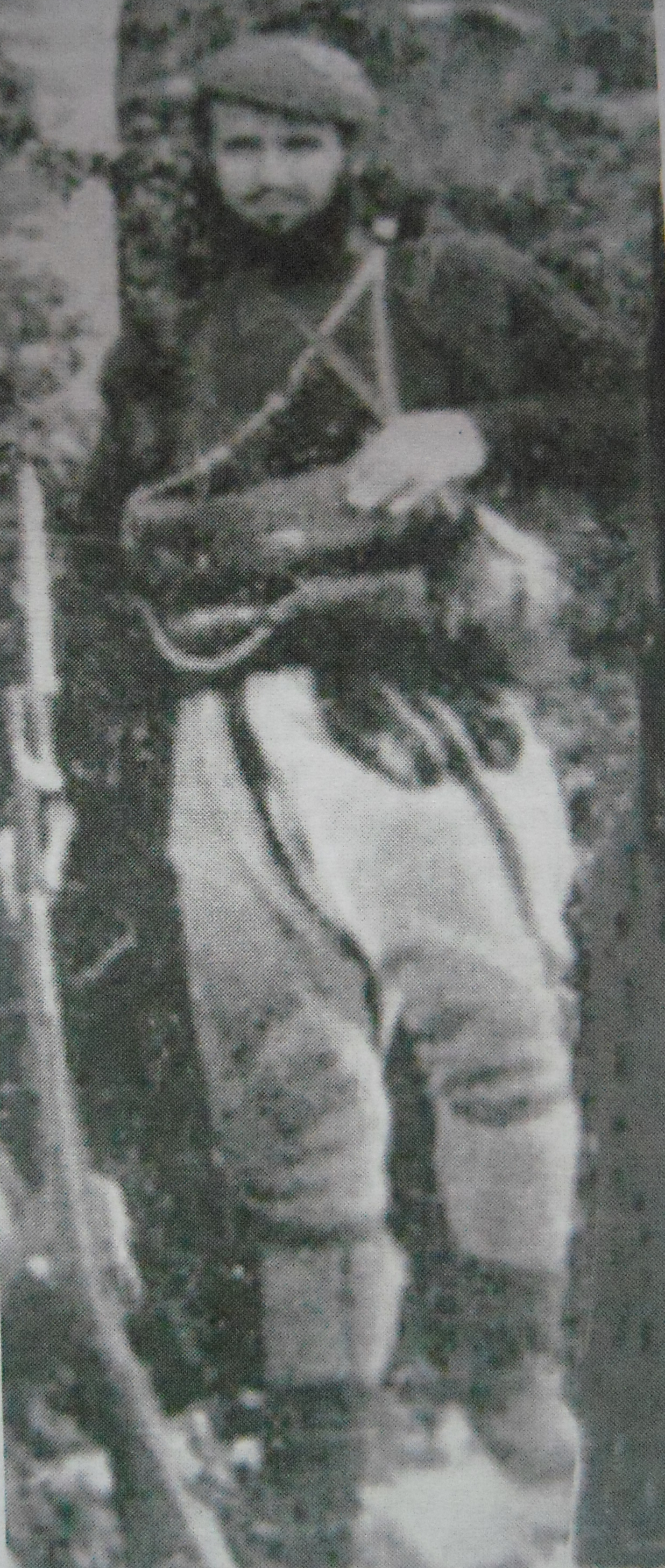
- A photograph of Georgi Atsev
- Born: 1884; Oreovec, Manastir Vilayet, Ottoman Empire (present-day North Macedonia)
- Died: 25 June 1906 (aged 21–22); Krapa, today North Macedonia
- Organization: IMARO

Georgi Atsev (Bulgarian: Георги Ацев), known as Goga, was a Bulgarian revolutionary, a worker of the Internal Macedonian-Adrianople Revolutionary Organization (IMARO) in the Prilep region.

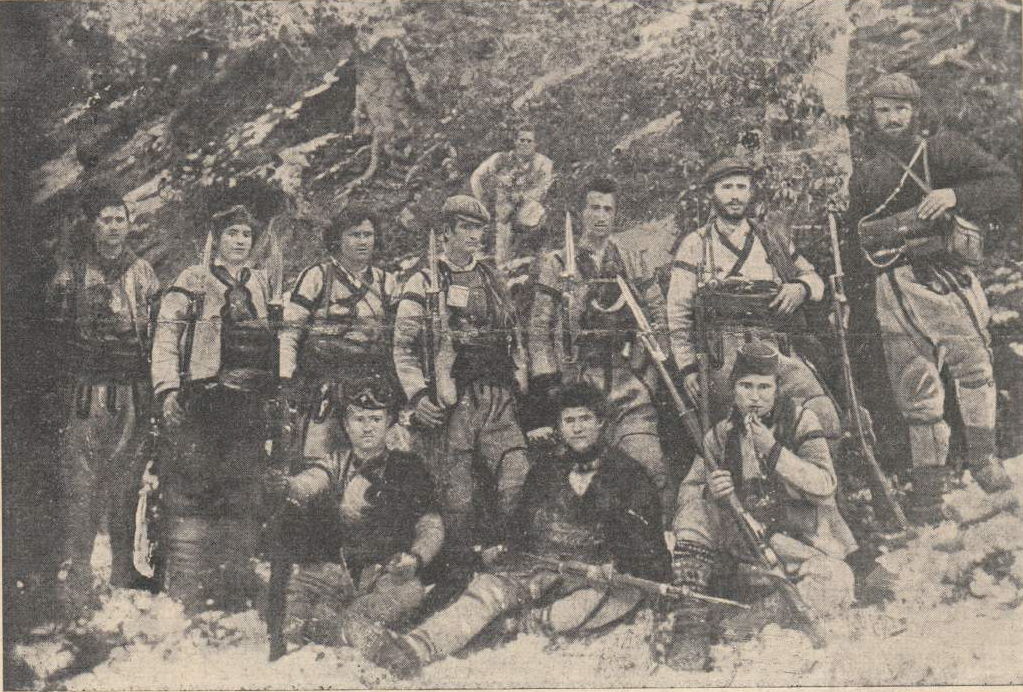
The revolutionary band of Georgi Atsev.

Georgi Atsev was born in 1884 in a small village of Oreovec, then part of the Manastir Vilayet of the Ottoman Empire.Georgi Atsev graduated from the Bulgarian Pedagogical School in Skopje. He worked as a teacher in the Tikveš region and joined the IMARO after the Ilinden-Preobrazhenie Uprising, in which his brothers Mirche and Petar took part as voyvodas. At the beginning, during the winter of 1904, he was a freedom fighter in his brother Peter’s revolutionary band, and later in 1905 he became a leader of his own revolutionary band. Atsev had a number of battles against Turkish soldiers and bands of the Serbian and Greek propaganda in Macedonia.

In September 1905, in the village of Polog, he defeated a Greek andart band composed of 10 members from Crete and 15 militia-men from the local Grecoman villages.

In the summer of 1906, he was betrayed, when he performed an act of revenge in the village of Krapa, and his band was attacked by the Serboman band of Gligor Sokolovic. He got injured in a skirmish with Serbian bands as a result of which he killed himself in order not to be captured alive.
