= Oreovec, Makedonski Brod =

Oreovec
- Village
- Ореовец
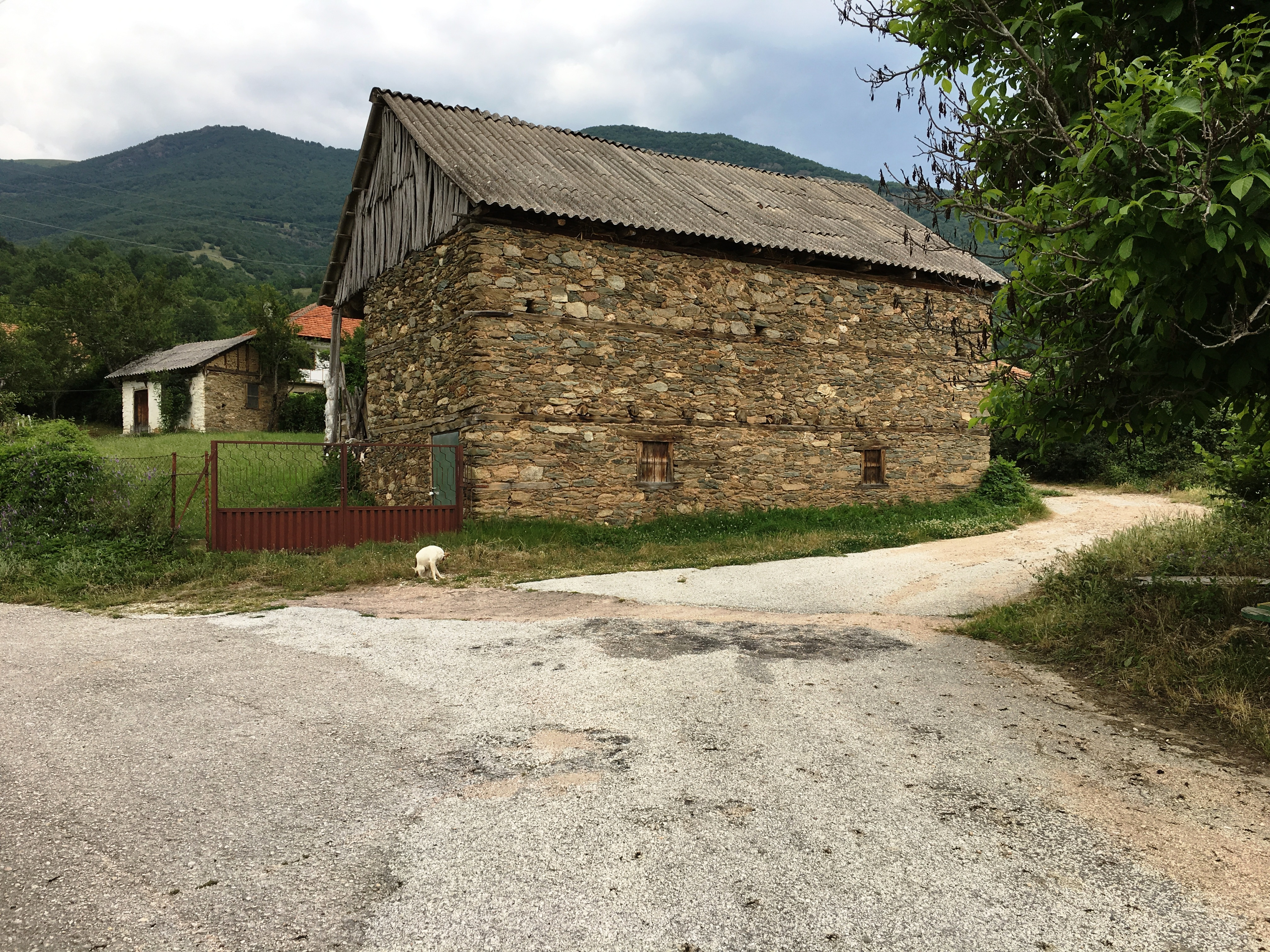
- Old houses in the village

- Location within North Macedonia
- Coordinates: 41°29′44″N 21°07′49″E
- Country: North Macedonia
- Region: Southwestern
- Municipality: Makedonski Brod

Population (2002)
  - Total: 155
- Time zone: UTC+1 (CET)
  - Summer (DST): UTC+2 (CEST)
- Car plates: MB
- Website: .

Oreovec (Macedonian: Ореовец) is a village in the municipality of Makedonski Brod, North Macedonia.

== Demographics ==
The village is attested in the 1467/68 Ottoman tax registry (defter) for the Nahiyah of Kırçova. The village had a total of 15 houses, excluding bachelors (mucerred).

According to the 2002 census, the village had a total of 155 inhabitants. Ethnic groups in the village include:

- Macedonians 26
- Turks 128
- Others 1
