= Kuzman Josifovski Pitu =

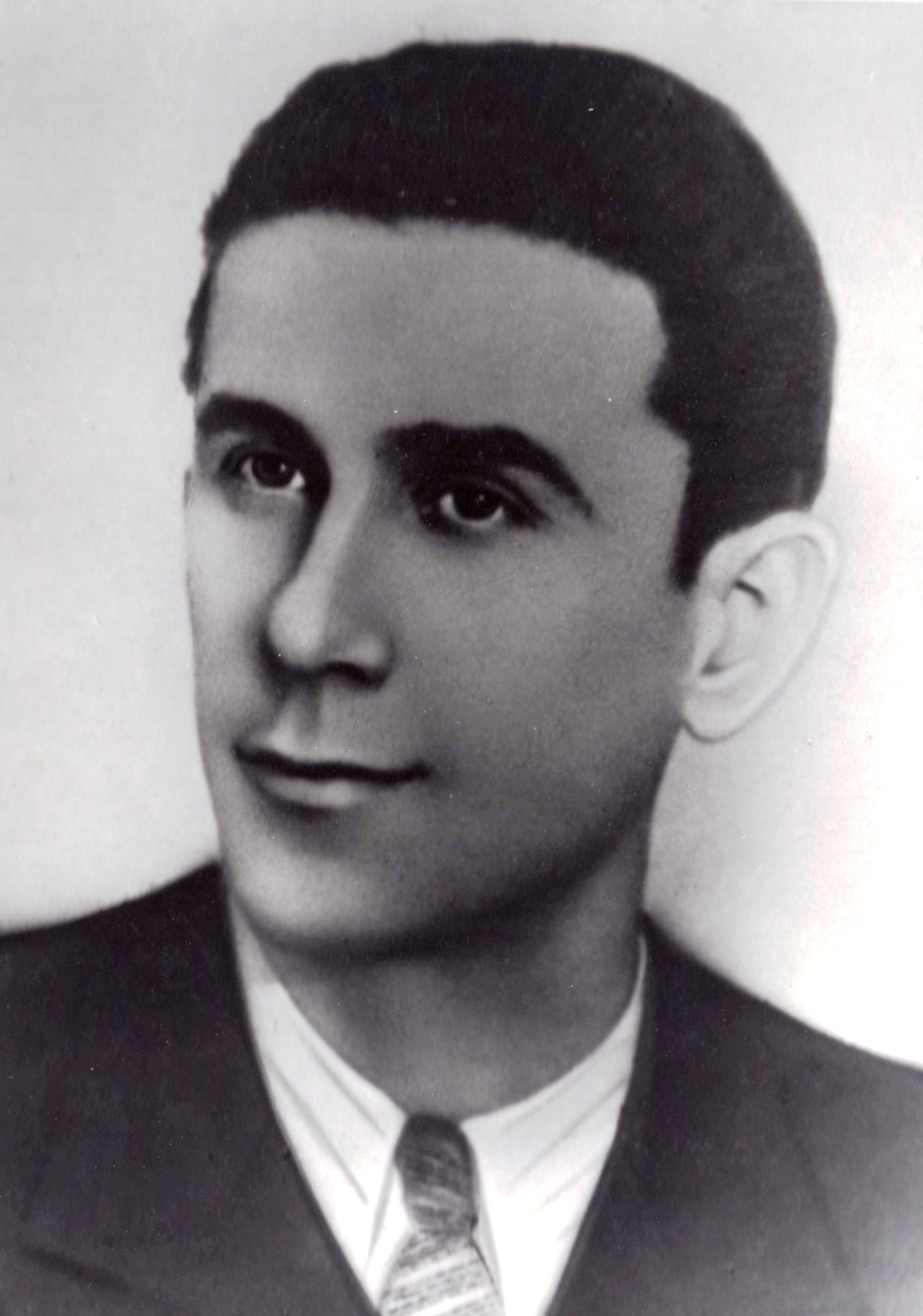
Kuzman Josifovski Pitu

Kuzman Josifovski Pitu (Macedonian: Кузман Јосифовски – Питу; 23 June 1915 – 25 February 1944) was a Macedonian communist partisan and one of the organizers of the Peoples's Liberation Struggle in Macedonia who was declared a People's Hero of Yugoslavia.

== Biography ==
He was born in 1915 in Prilep (then in the Kingdom of Serbia) and studied Faculty of Law in Belgrade from 1935. In 1938, he was elected as a member of the Communist Party of Yugoslavia. In 1939, he went back to Prilep, where he became a member of the Local Committee of the CPY and in September was elected a member of the Provincial Committee of the CPY for Macedonia. After Yugoslavia was occupied by the Axis forces in 1941, Kuzman was sent by CPY to Western Macedonia, which was occupied by Albanian and Italian forces. There he attended a number of local conferences and meetings dedicated to the organisation of the antifascist struggle in that area. In early 1943, Kuzman became a member of the Main headquarters of the People's liberation army and Partisan units of Macedonia.

On 25 February 1944, he went to Skopje (then annexed by the Kingdom of Bulgaria) for a secret meeting of the Central Committee of the Bulgarian Workers' Party. Bulgarian police discovered his location in the city and he was shot dead during the chase.

== Legacy ==
He was named "Pitu" in Pitu Guli's honor. There are a few of his busts in several cities in North Macedonia. Also, a number of schools and streets in North Macedonia bear his name.

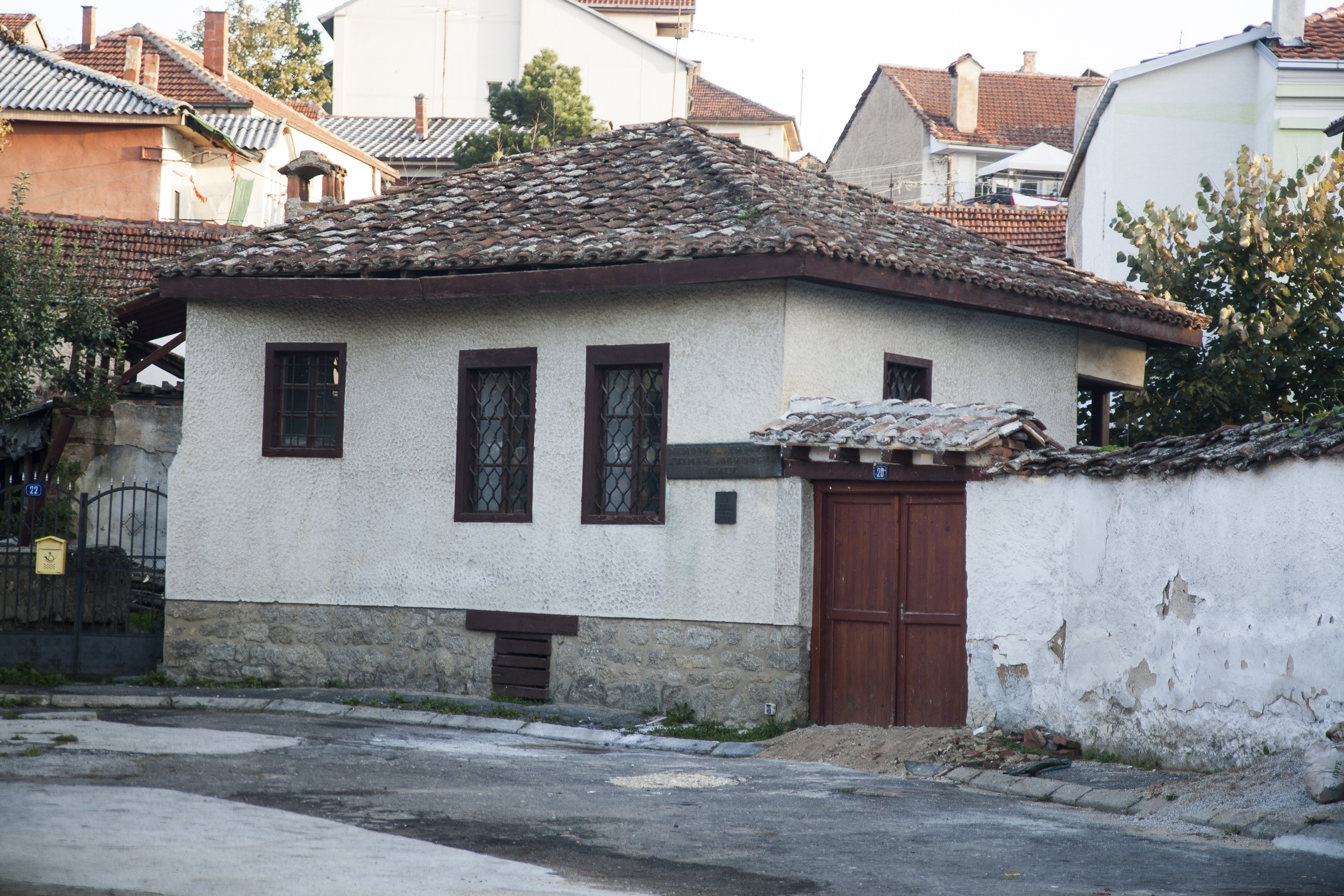
The Josifovski house in Prilep

=== Memorial museum ===
The house in which Josifovski Pitu and his brother and two sisters were born and raised serves today as a museum and memorial house, run by the Museum of Prilep. The exhibits of Josifovski Pitu's childhood and revolutionary activities are spread across three rooms. On display are photographs, letters and correspondences, books, and other objects.

== See also ==
- List of people from Prilep
