= Nikodin =

Nikodin Никодин
- Village
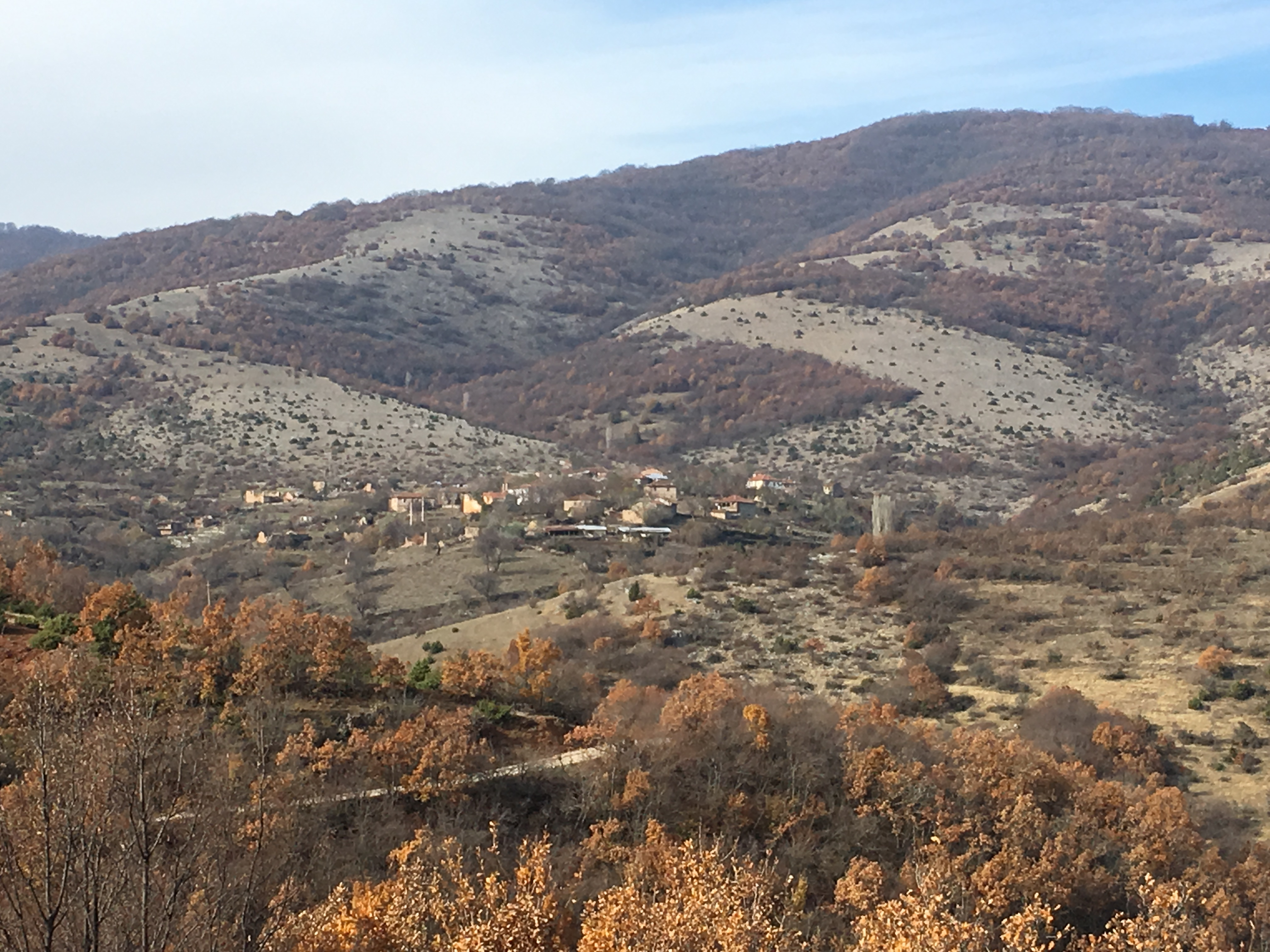

- Location within North Macedonia
- Country: North Macedonia
- Region: Pelagonia
- Municipality: Prilep
- Elevation: 548 m (1,798 ft)

Population (2002)
  - Total: 7
- Time zone: UTC+1 (CET)
- Area code: +389/48/4XXXXX

Nikodin is a village in Municipality of Prilep, North Macedonia.

== Demographics ==
According to the 2002 census, the village had a total of 7 inhabitants. Ethnic groups in the village include:

- Macedonians 6
- Others 1
