= Blaže Koneski =

Macedonian academic (1921–1993)

- Блаже Конески
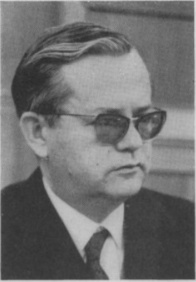
- Koneski in 1968
- Born: 19 December 1921; Nebregovo, Kingdom of Serbs, Croats and Slovenes
- Died: 7 December 1993 (aged 71); Skopje, Macedonia
- Citizenship: Macedonian/Yugoslav/Bulgarian
- Occupations: Writer, translator and linguistic scholar

Blaže Koneski (Macedonian and Serbian: Блаже Конески; 19 December 1921 – 7 December 1993) was a Macedonian poet, writer, literary translator, and linguistic scholar, who had a major contribution to the codification of the standard Macedonian language, for which he earned the reputation of father of the Macedonian literary language. He is the key figure who shaped Macedonian literature and intellectual life in the country. During his life and after his death, Koneski has been accused of deliberately serbianizing the Macedonian standard.

== Biography ==
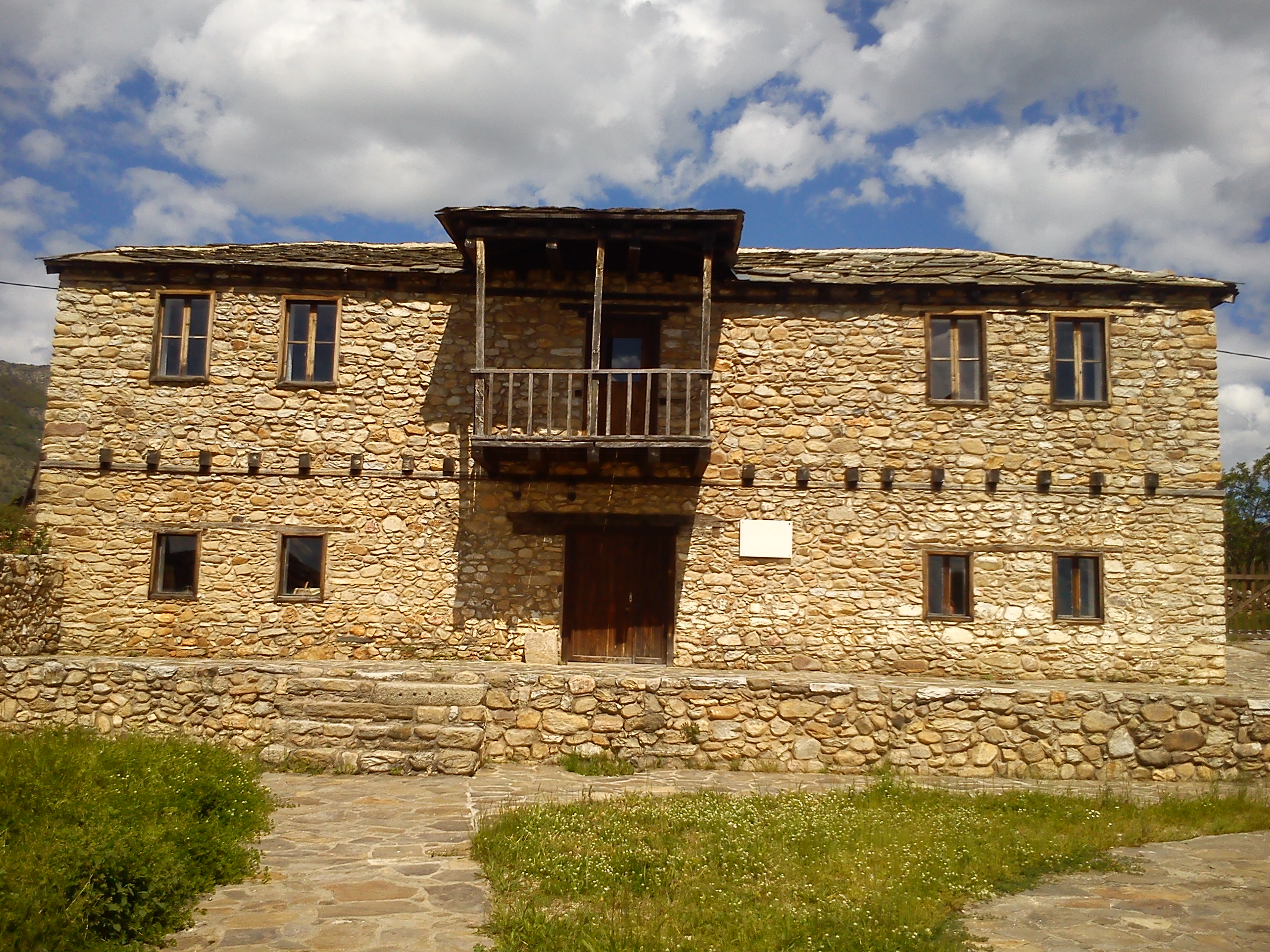
Blaže Koneski's house in his birthplace, now a memorial house

=== Early years ===
Koneski was born on 19 December 1921 in Nebregovo, near Prilep, in the province of South Serbia, part of the Kingdom of Serbs, Croats and Slovenes (current-day North Macedonia), in a pro-Serbian family. He belonged to the Ljamevci family, whose Slava (patron saint) was St. Nicholas Day. His maternal uncle, Serbian Chetnik Gligor Sokolović, was one of the champions of Serbian propaganda in Ottoman Macedonia in the early 20th century. According to Koneski himself, his village became oriented towards the Serbian propaganda in the early 20th century and Sokolović was responsible for this shift. However, per Koneski, this shift was not nationally motivated and his family did not raise him as a Serbian, rather he always felt as a Macedonian. Per the Macedonian Bulgarian authors Dragi Dragnev and Kosta Tsarnushanov, Konevski was born as Blagoje Ordan Ljameski or Ljamević in a family that was strongly pro-Serbian and identified as Serbian. According to historian Chris Kostov, in his youth, he regarded Serbian as his native language. The Internal Macedonian Revolutionary Organization revolutionary Traycho Chundev described him in his diary as a "Serboman" who insists on the Serbian alphabet.

He studied in his native village and Prilep. After receiving a Royal Serbian scholarship, he studied in the Kragujevac gymnasium or high school in central Serbia. In the gymnasium, he served as the editor of its magazine, wrote Serbian-language poems and completed his secondary education in 1939. When Koneski returned to his native village, he spoke a Serbianized language and was ridiculed for it by the locals, upon that he felt like he betrayed his people and started to re-learn the local dialect. In 1939, he studied medicine at the University of Belgrade, but switched to Slavic philology there in 1940, studying under Aleksandar Belić and Radovan Košutić, among others. In that period, he wrote his first linguistic work devoted to his native Prilep dialect, which was published in 1949. In 1941, after the defeat of Yugoslavia in Aufmarsch 25, and the subsequent Bulgarian rule of Macedonia, he enrolled in the Faculty of Slavic Studies at the Sofia University under the name Blagoy Konev, graduating in 1944. After the Bulgarian coup d'état in September 1944, he returned to his native land. In September 1944, Koneski was summoned to the village Gorno Vranovci, where he helped edit the newspaper Mlad Borec (Young Fighter) and translated content. Koneski also began working in the department for communist agitprop at the Main Headquarters of the Macedonian Partisans.

=== Early codification of Macedonian ===
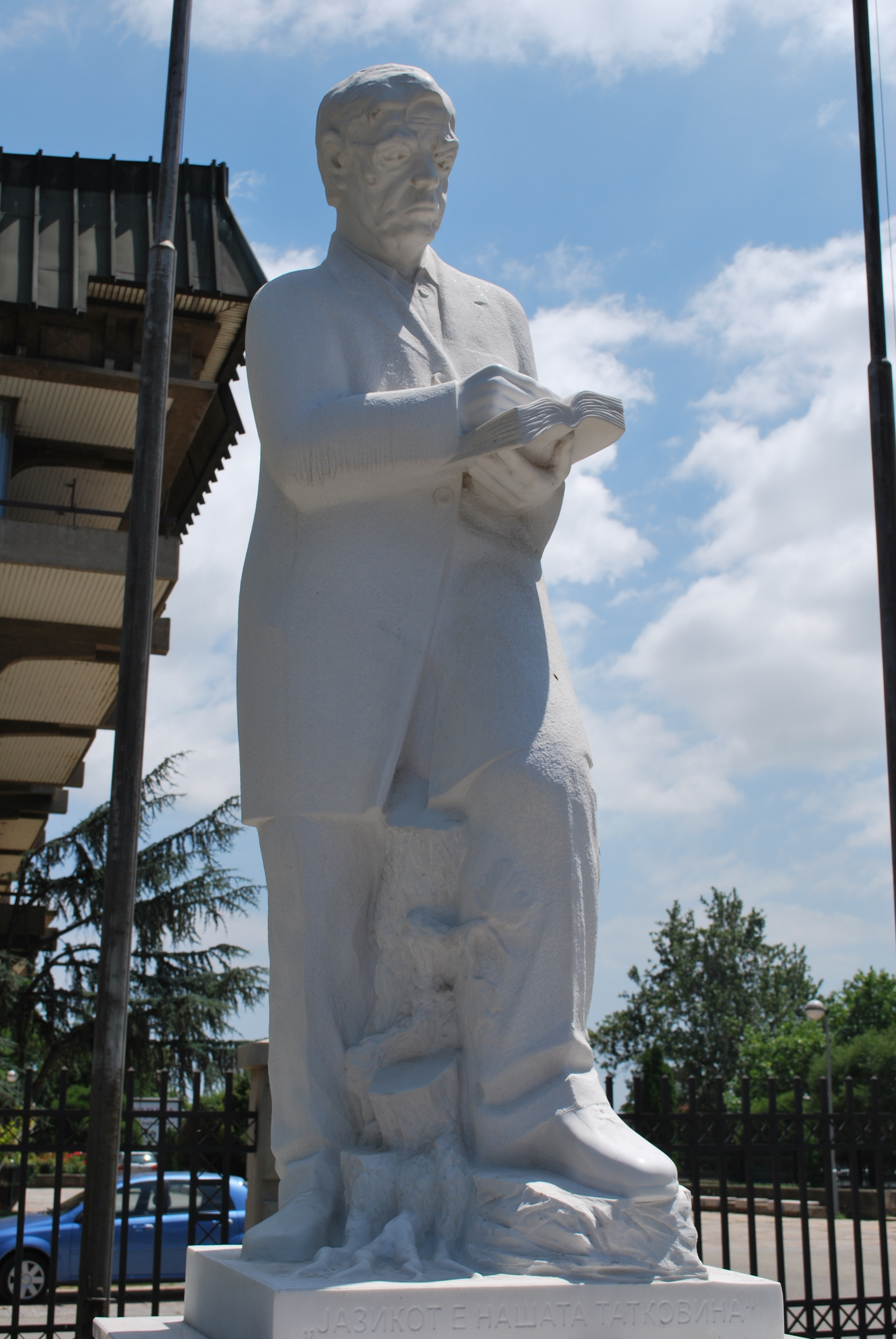
Monument of Koneski in front of the Macedonian Academy of Sciences and Arts in Skopje

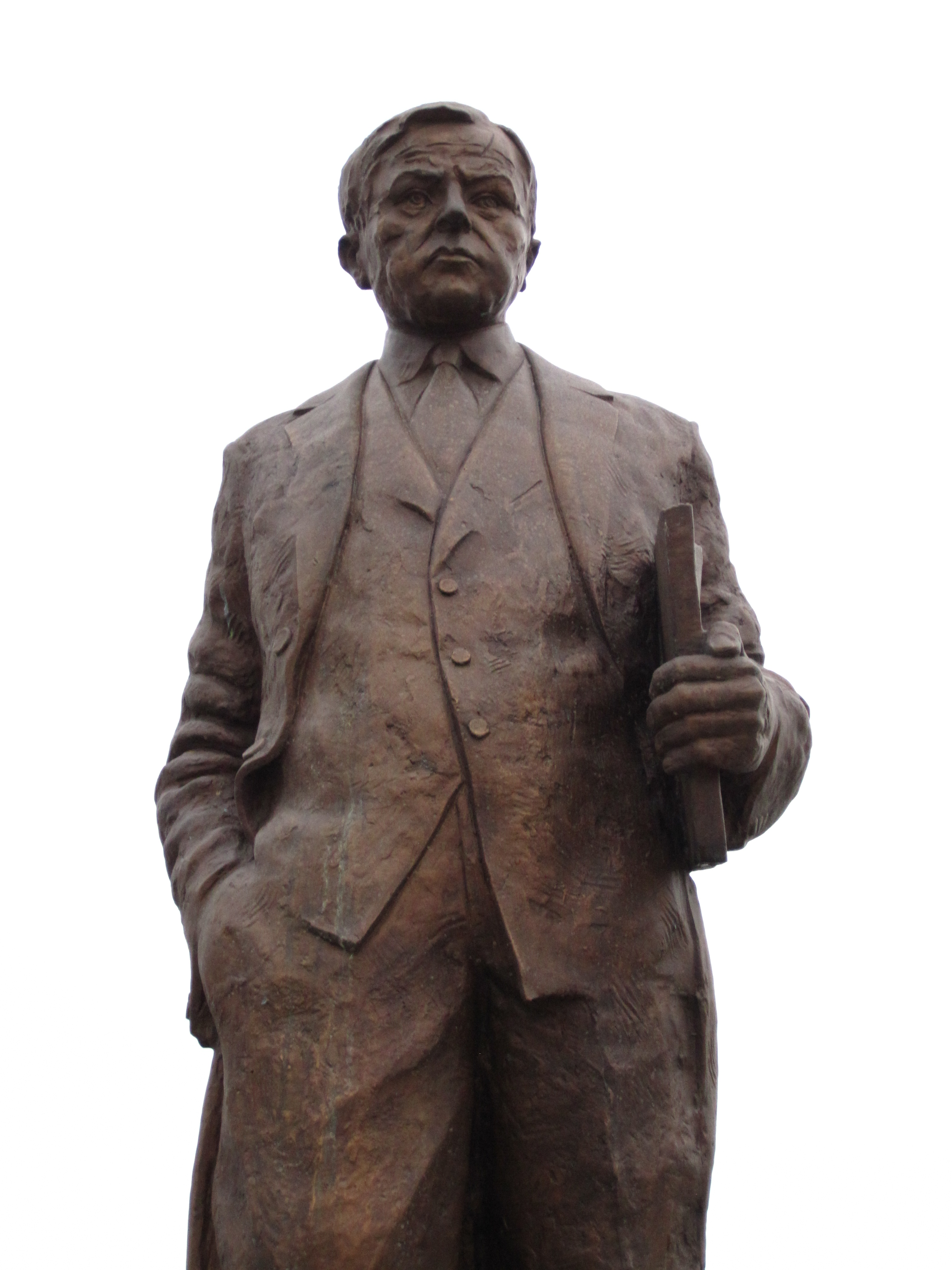
Statue of Koneski on the Art Bridge in Skopje

A Commission for the Establishment of the Macedonian Language, Alphabet and Orthography was tasked with establishing an alphabet and a standardized language, with three linguistic commissions of ASNOM functioning from 1944 to 1945. At the age of 22, he was nominated to join the commission. He was the youngest member of the commission and had the most recent education in Slavic linguistics then. A conflict emerged between Koneski and Venko Markovski. The letter yer divided Markovski and Koneski, which the former supported and the latter opposed. Koneski advocated for the full adoption of the Serbian Cyrillic alphabet. Slavist Victor Friedman has said that Koneski advocated for the adoption of Serbian Cyrillic on purely linguistic and pedagogical grounds. Koneski argued that at the time most Macedonians were educated with this orthography and insisted that any other choice would make them illiterate. Most members of the commission wanted to create a distinct Macedonian alphabet. There were long debates over the dorsopalatals kj and gj. Koneski proposed the signs for their Serbian palatal equivalents (ћ and ђ), but other members perceived them as "too Serbian." Vasil Iljoski convinced him that he was being "politically naive" in endorsing the use of Serbian Cyrillic for the dorsopalatal stops on purely linguistic grounds. He participated only in the first day of the conference as he felt that the commission would not produce results and more younger people were needed in it.

According to Chris Kostov, there were heated debates among the members of the commission, where Koneski insisted on the replacement of Bulgarian words with Serbian as much as possible, while Markovski was opposed to this. Per Macedonian revisionist historian Stojan Kiselinovski, Koneski who was from a family which followed Serbian traditional values, engaged in conflict with Markovski whose family nurtured Bulgarian Exarchate traditional values. Much later, in his memoirs, Markovski will depict this conflict as a national one and that he was trying to save the alphabet from total Serbification. However, the stenographic transcripts of the debates show that this opposition was not nationally based, since Markovski, the future pro-Bulgarian and Bulgarian nationalist, even apprised the historical legacy of Krste Misirkov to the other members of the commission. A personal conflict also arose between Koneski and the teacher and linguist Gjorgji Kiselinov as Kiselinov had already developed a project on the Macedonian alphabet and grammar that was not considered by the commission, largely because of Koneski. Kiselinov later also interpreted this conflict as a national one, as he said that he was marginalized by Koneski because his family was pro-Bulgarian, while Koneski's was pro-Serbian.

The first version of the Macedonian alphabet was announced on 28 December 1944. The proposed alphabet was original and introduced special characters. Yer was preserved. Koneski ended up leaving the commission, apparently because he considered the other participants to be "linguistically naive" and insufficiently prepared. The proposal was rejected by ASNOM. In April 1945, the agitprop section of the Central Committee of the Communist Party of Yugoslavia invited Koneski, Markovski and Veselinka Malinska to Belgrade. According to the memoirs of Yugoslav politician Milovan Djilas, Koneski's proposals were accepted. On 3 May 1945, a new alphabet proposal was presented to the Macedonian Ministry of Education, which approved it. This proposal was signed by ten people, including Koneski, Markovski and Iljoski. Koneski has been accused of deliberately serbianizing the Macedonian standard. A number of intellectuals considered the Macedonian alphabet as "too Serbified", such as Markovski, Vasil Ivanovski, Pavel Shatev and Panko Brashnarov. However, Koneski made sure to gradually correct errors, limiting the Serbian influence on Macedonian, by creating new words and an original lexicon. Koneski came up with the basic directives for the construction of a Macedonian vocabulary. His innovations were not promptly adopted by all Macedonians. Per Koneski, the newly created words, such as nastan (event) and prašanje (question), were initially perceived as "funny" by people. According to Koneski, opponents of literary Macedonian attempted to negate the influence of codification efforts by accusing them of being "Serbianizing".

=== Later work ===
Koneski came up with a new interpretation of national history, distinguishing the Macedonian revival from the Bulgarian revival. Combining the Marxist socioeconomic analytical perspective with the post-romantic national discourse, Koneski sought to de-Bulgarianize history and language, perceiving the Macedonian national consciousness as antagonistic to the Bulgarian national consciousness. In 1945, he worked as a lector in the Macedonian National Theater. As part of the theater, Koneski translated Othello by William Shakespeare, the works by Ivo Andrić and Vjekoslav Kaleb. He also translated poetry from German (works by Friedrich Gottlieb Klopstock, Johann Wolfgang Goethe, Friedrich Schiller, Friedrich Hölderlin, Heinrich Heine), Russian (works by Alexander Blok and Vladimir Mayakovsky), Serbo-Croatian (works by Petar Petrović Njegoš and Desanka Maksimović), Czech (works by Karel Jaromir Erben and Jan Neruda), Polish (works by Adam Mickiewicz, Juliusz Słowacki, Leopold Staff, Julian Tuwim, Tadeusz Różewicz), Slovenian (works by France Prešeren), and Bulgarian (works by Lazar Poptraykov and Nikola Yonkov Vaptsarov). On behalf of the ministry, he was included in a group that was to arrange the establishment of the Faculty of Philosophy. In 1946, he began working as a lecturer at the Department of Macedonian Language in the newly established Faculty of Philosophy. He was a member of the Macedonian PEN Center, one of the founders of the Macedonian Writers' Association in 1947 and its first president.

After the Tito-Stalin split, the Central Committee of the Bulgarian Communist Party criticized the "Serbified language" of the Socialist Republic of Macedonia in 1948. Koneski reacted to the Bulgarian accusations, regarding them as an attack on the Macedonian national identity. Bulgarian linguists also started claiming that the Macedonian standard was Serbianized in that period. In 1952, Koneski issued the Phonology of his Grammar of the Macedonian Language. In the same year, Bulgarian linguist Kiril Mirchev tried to prove that Macedonian was part of Bulgarian, but regarded its norm and lexicon as Serbified. Koneski issued a rebuttal in an essay.

In 1952/1953, he served as Dean of the Faculty of Philosophy of Skopje University. In 1957, he became as a full-time professor. Koneski served as the rector of Skopje University from 1958 to 1960. He was the editor of the periodicals Nov den (New day) and Makedonski jazik (Macedonian language). Koneski was an editor of the first Macedonian dictionary, Dictionary of the Macedonian language (Macedonian: Речник на македонскиот јазик), from 1961 to 1966. It also contained Serbo-Croatian translations. According to Slavist Christian Voss, the end of Soviet Union's support for the challenging of standard Macedonian's legitimacy from abroad coincided with the preparation of the Macedonian dictionary published between 1961 and 1966. This dictionary marked the end of the initial period of the implementation of the standard, which was characterized by a nativization of the lexicon, avoiding Serbian and Bulgarian loanwords. Voss has also argued that there has been a pro-Serbian bias in the dictionary. Major works of his include History of the Macedonian Language (Macedonian: Историја на македонскиот јазик; 1965), Grammar of Literary Macedonian (Macedonian: Граматика на македонскиот литературен јазик), and The Macedonian 19th Century: Linguistic and Literary Historical Contributions (1986).

Bulgarian linguists, such as Iliya Talev, have accused Koneski of plagiarizing and falsifying Kiril Mirchev's Historical Grammar of the Bulgarian Language with his History of the Macedonian Language because both authors analyzed the same corpus of texts. Koneski did claim the corpus of texts was linguistically distinct from Bulgarian. Bulgarian philologists also criticized Koneski for ignoring the parallels between Macedonian and Bulgarian. Koneski preferred to compare Macedonian with other Balkan languages, such as Albanian, Modern Greek, Romanian and Aromanian.

He became a member of the Macedonian Academy of Sciences and Arts (MANU) in 1967 and served as its first president, until 1975. At MANU, he directed the project Professional and Scientific Terminology of the Macedonian Language. Gradually he earned the reputation as "father of the Macedonian literary language". Koneski was also a corresponding member of the Austrian Academy of Sciences, Croatian Academy of Sciences and Arts, Serbian Academy of Sciences, Slovenian Academy of Sciences and Arts, Polish Academy of Sciences, Montenegrin Academy of Sciences and Arts, Academy of Sciences and Arts of Bosnia and Herzegovina, and Vojvodina Academy of Sciences and Arts. He was also an honorary doctor of the Universities of Chicago, United States, and Kraków, Poland. When Koneski visited Chicago in 1969 and received the title of "Doctor Honoris Causa" from a local university, letters of protest were sent to the rector by two Albanian intellectuals from Bitola living in Istanbul, claiming the Macedonian language was invented by the Yugoslav Communists to de-Bulgarianize the local Slavs. Koneski and Božidar Vidoeski were also active in international Slavist networks and expanded Macedonian studies abroad. In attempts to legitimize their point of view on the Macedonian identity and language, the leaders of the Bulgarian Communist Party, Bulgarian Academy of Sciences and state had also spread pro-Bulgarian propaganda in international scholarly circles, attempting to prevent the University of Chicago from awarding the honorary degree to Koneski. Friedman mentioned Koneski as one of his mentors. In the 1980s and 1990s, anti-Yugoslav Macedonian nationalists accused Koneski and the communist elite of Serbianizing the Macedonian standard language. In turn, they were accused of Bulgarophilia and Serbophobia. By the early 1990s, the right-wing media also made such accusations. From the 1990s, Macedonian historical revisionists, who questioned the narrative established in Communist Yugoslavia, have described the process of codifying Macedonian, to which Koneski was an important contributor, as 'Serbianization'. Koneski died in Skopje, Republic of Macedonia (now North Macedonia), on 7 December 1993.

== Literary works and awards ==
Koneski wrote poetry and prose. His collections of poetry include: Mostot, Pesni, Zemjata i ljubovta, Vezilka, Zapisi, Cesmite, Stari i novi pesni, Seizmograf, among others. He also wrote a collection of short stories named Vineyard Macedonian: Lozje. His 1948 poem Teškoto (named after the dance Teškoto) is taught in Macedonian elementary schools.

Koneski won a number of literary prizes such as the AVNOJ prize, the Njegoš prize, the Golden Wreath ("Zlaten Venec") of the Struga Poetry Evenings (in 1981), the Award of the Writer's Union of the USSR, Herder Prize (in 1971) and others.

== Legacy ==
In December 1993, shortly after Koneski's death, the doyen of Macedonian historians Blaže Ristovski criticized Koneski's alphabet and insisted on its reform, demanding changes in the Macedonian letters, with the proposed changes being described as Bulgarophilic. By the late 1990s, writers and journalists, who were close to the VMRO-DPMNE and pro-Bulgarian, made Serbification accusations against him, denouncing the Macedonian national identity in the same way as Bulgaria. They regarded Koneski as a "Serbian agent" and glorified his opponent Markovski. The Faculty of Philology at the University of Skopje was named after him on 26 March 1997. His birthplace has been transformed into a memorial and educational center in North Macedonia.

A Macedonian Historical Dictionary was published, edited by historian Stojan Kiselinovski from Greek Macedonia, which caused a public scandal due to the entry for Koneski, where instead of emphasizing his historical contribution, it simply stated that Koneski "advocated the use of the Serbian alphabet (that of Vuk Karadžić) in Macedonia." According to Bulgarian historian Tchavdar Marinov, it is nearly a taboo topic in North Macedonia to point out the Serbophilia of the Yugoslav Macedonian builders of the Macedonian language and national identity as Koneski, and this is considered there as a pro-Bulgarian act. Per Kostov, the works by him and his contemporaries were based on negative experiences with the Bulgarian authorities. According to Bulgarian academic Milen Mihov, Koneski was involved in cultural debulgarization and the imposition of Yugoslav cultural and political monopoly. Regarding Koneski and the codification process, Marinov wrote:

The fact that Macedonian was largely codified by a single individual–Blaže Koneski– is also not unnatural. Koneski had a number of illustrious precursors elsewhere whose activity had clear political stakes, including Vuk Karadžić (for Serbian and Serbo-Croatian), Aasen (New Norwegian or Nynorsk), Ben Yehuda (Modern Hebrew), Atatürk (Modern Turkish) and Aavik (Estonian). What the simplistic conclusions ignore is that every national language is an ‘artifact’, a result of meta-linguistic intervention that separates the ‘correct’ from the ‘incorrect’. It is a social and cultural reality, constructed through projects and actions that are eminently political.

== Bibliography ==
=== Poetry and prose ===
- Land and Love (poetry, 1948)
- Poems (1953)
- The Embroideress (poetry, 1955)
- The Vineyard (short stories, 1955)
- Poems (1963)
- Sterna (poetry, 1966), Hand - Shaking (narrative poem, 1969)
- Notes (poetry, 1974)
- Poems Old and New (poetry, 1979)
- Places and Moments (poetry, 1981)
- The Fountains (poetry, 1984)
- The Epistle (poetry, 1987)
- Meeting in Heaven (poetry, 1988)
- The Church (poetry 1988)
- A Diary after Many Years (prose, 1988)
- Golden Peak (poetry, 1989)
- Seismograph (poetry, 1989)
- The Heavenly River (poems and translations, 1991)
- The Black Ram (poetry, 1993)

=== Academic and other works ===
- Normative Guide with a Dictionary of Standard Macedonian with Krum Tošev (1950)
- Grammar of Standard Macedonian (volume 1, 1952)
- Standard Macedonian (1959)
- A Grammar of Standard Macedonian (volume 2, 1954)
- Macedonian Dictionary (1961)
- A History of Macedonian (1965)
- Macedonian Dictionary (volume 2, edited, 1965)
- Macedonian Dictionary (volume 3, 1966)
- The Language of the Macedonian Folk Poetry (1971)
- Speeches and Essays (1972)
- Macedonian Textbooks of 19th Century: Linguistic, Literary, Historical Texts (1986)
- Images and Themes (essays, 1987)
- The Tikveš Anthology (study, 1987)
- Poetry (Konstantin Miladinov), the Way Blaze Koneski Reads It (1989)
- Macedonian Locations and Topics (essays, 1991)
- The World of the Legend and the Song (essays, 1993)

== See also ==
- Haralampije Polenaković

Preceded by Miroslav Krleža	President of the Association of Writers of Yugoslavia; 1961-1964	Succeeded by Meša Selimović
