= Oreovec, Prilep =

Oreovec Ореовец
- Village
- Location within North Macedonia
- Country: North Macedonia
- Region: Pelagonia
- Municipality: Prilep
- Elevation: 780 m (2,560 ft)

Population (2002)
  - Total: 17
- Time zone: UTC+1 (CET)
- Area code: +389/48/4XXXXX

Oreovec is a village in Municipality of Prilep, North Macedonia.

== Demographics ==
According to the 2002 census, the village had a total of 17 inhabitants. Ethnic groups in the village include:

- Macedonians 16
- Others 1

A notable person born in this village was Mirche Atsev (Bulgarian: Мирче Ацев), or Mirče Acev, nicknamed Orovchanets, he was a Bulgarianrevolutionary from Ottoman Macedonia, a leader of an Internal Macedonian-Adrianople Revolutionary Organization (IMARO) revolutionary band.
