= Mustafino =

Mustafino may refer to:

North Macedonia

- Mustafino, Sveti Nikole

Russia

- Mustafino, Aurgazinsky District, Republic of Bashkortostan
- Mustafino, Bakalinsky District, Republic of Bashkortostan
- Mustafino, Sterlibashevsky District, Republic of Bashkortostan
- Mustafino, Tuymazinsky District, Republic of Bashkortostan
