= Viničani =

Viničani Виничани
- Village
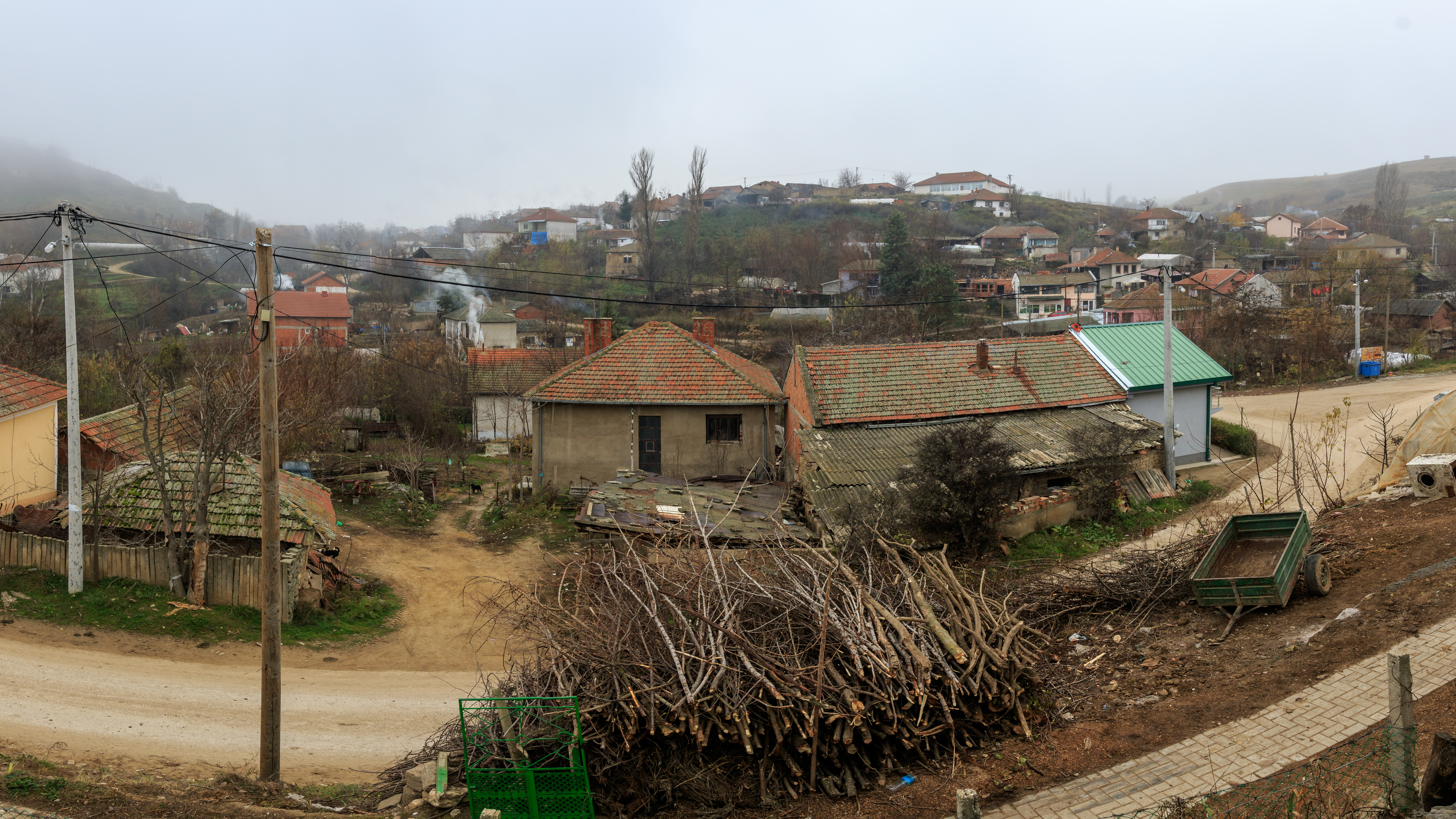

- Location within North Macedonia
- Coordinates: 41.600446°N 21.897827°E
- Country: North Macedonia
- Region: Vardar
- Municipality: Gradsko

Population (2002)
  - Total: 569
- Time zone: UTC+1 (CET)
  - Summer (DST): UTC+2 (CEST)
- Website: .

Viničani (Macedonian: Виничани) is a village in the municipality of Gradsko, North Macedonia.

== History ==
Viničani has a history over 550 years. The settlement is recorded with 2 names. As "Viniçani" as well as "Raçince" in the Ottoman Tahrir Defter number 370 dating to 1530 and as a village of the Köprülü kaza.

== Demographics ==
According to the 2002 census, the village had a total of 569 inhabitants. Ethnic groups in the village include:

- Macedonians 487
- Turks 22
- Serbs 1
- Bosniaks 58
- Others 1
