= Sveḱani =

Sveḱani Свеќани Sveqanë
- Village
- Location within North Macedonia
- Coordinates: 41.5978°N 21.8531°E
- Country: North Macedonia
- Region: Vardar
- Municipality: Gradsko

Population (2002)
  - Total: 130
- Time zone: UTC+1 (CET)
  - Summer (DST): UTC+2 (CEST)
- Car plates: VE
- Website: .

Sveḱani (Macedonian: Свеќани, Albanian: Sveqanë) is an abandoned village in the municipality of Gradsko, North Macedonia.

== Demographics ==
The settlement last had inhabitants in the 1961 census, where it was recorded as being populated by 11 Albanians and 5 Macedonians.

According to the 2002 census, the village had 0 inhabitants.
