= Milino =

Milino Милино Milinë
- Village
- Location within North Macedonia
- Coordinates: 41.804349°N 21.866950°E
- Country: North Macedonia
- Region: Vardar
- Municipality: Lozovo

Population (2002)
  - Total: 334
- Time zone: UTC+1 (CET)
  - Summer (DST): UTC+2 (CEST)
- Website: .

Milino (Macedonian: Милино,Albanian: Milinë) is a village in the municipality of Lozovo, North Macedonia.

== Demographics ==
According to the 2002 census, the village had a total of 334 inhabitants. Ethnic groups in the village include:

- Macedonians 237
- Turks 21
- Serbs 2
- Aromanians 1
- Albanians 35
- Bosniaks 34
- Others 4
