= Nogaevci =

Nogaevci Ногаевци
- Village
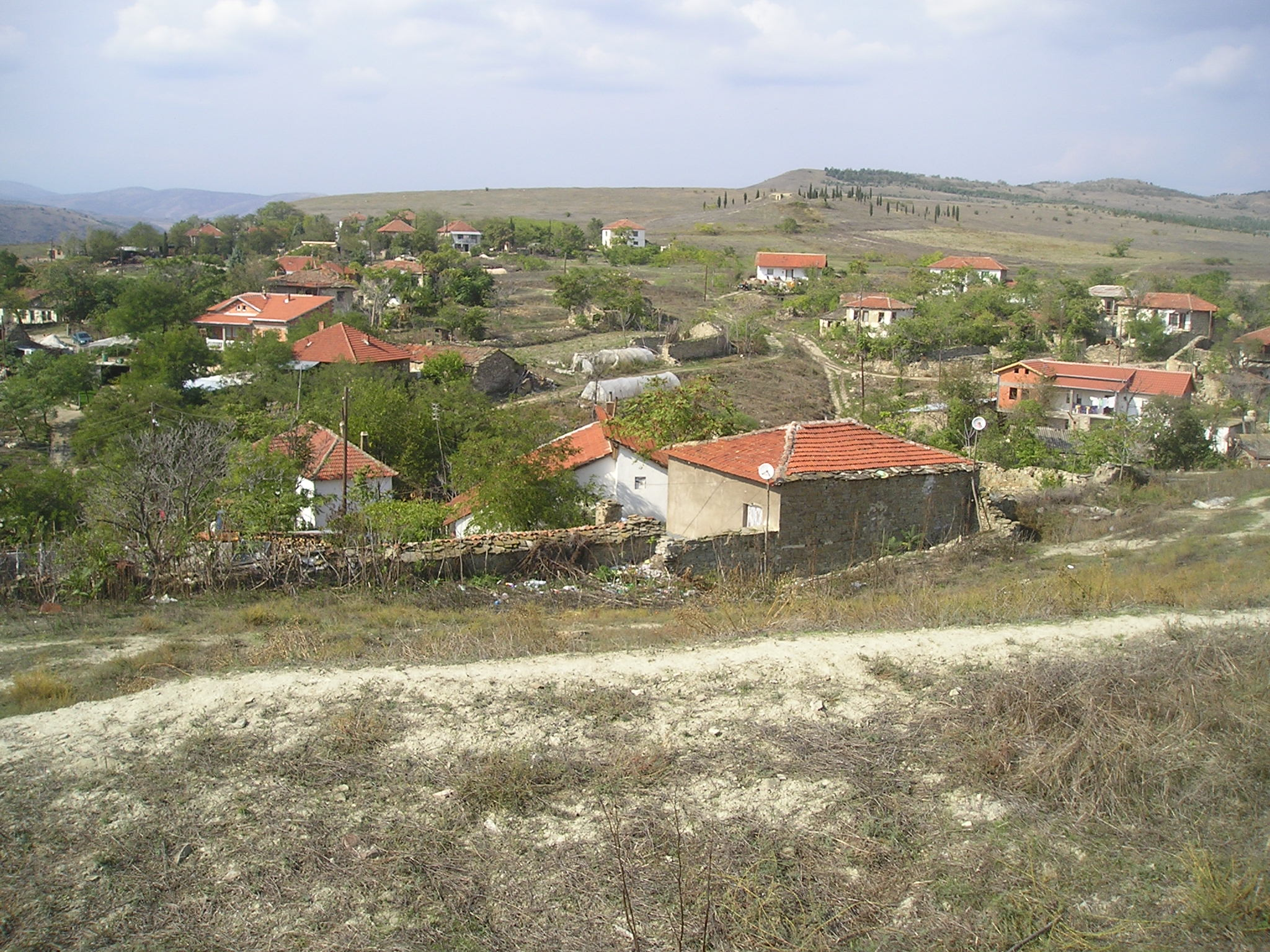

- Location within North Macedonia
- Coordinates: 41.628351°N 21.905409°E
- Country: North Macedonia
- Region: Vardar
- Municipality: Gradsko

Population (2002)
  - Total: 239
- Time zone: UTC+1 (CET)
  - Summer (DST): UTC+2 (CEST)
- Website: .

Nogaevci (Macedonian: Ногаевци) is a village in the municipality of Gradsko, North Macedonia.

== Demographics ==
On the 1927 ethnic map of Leonhard Schulze-Jena, the village is written as Nogajevci and as a fully Christian Bulgarian village. According to the 2002 census, the village had a total of 239 inhabitants. Ethnic groups in the village include:

- Macedonians 236
- Albanians 1
- Serbs 2
