= Bekirlija =

Bekirlija Бекирлија
- Village
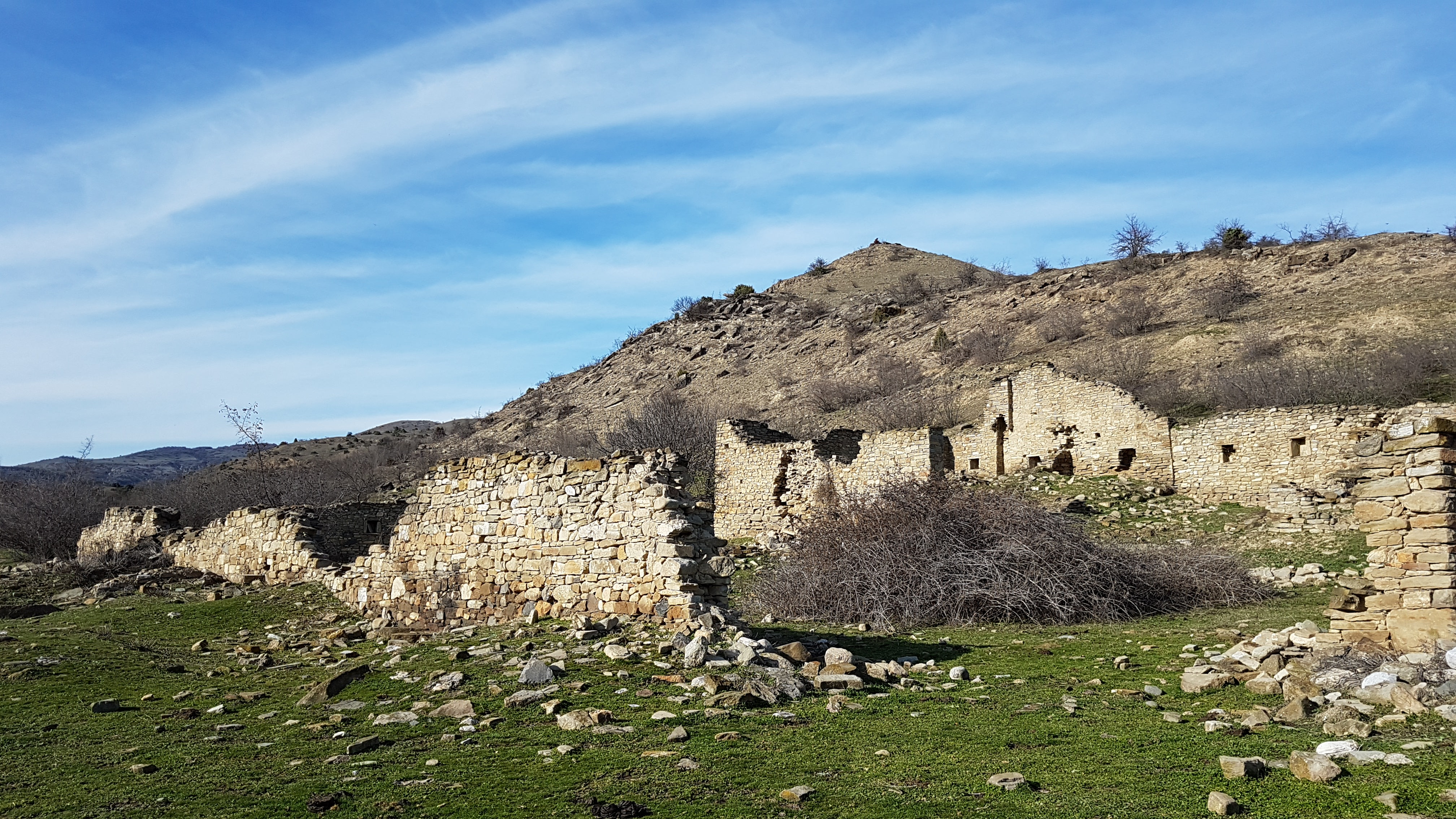
- Ruins of Bekirlija

- Location within North Macedonia
- Coordinates: 41°40′48″N 21°56′27″E
- Country: North Macedonia
- Region: Vardar
- Municipality: Lozovo

Population (2021)
  - Total: 1
- Time zone: UTC+1 (CET)
  - Summer (DST): UTC+2 (CEST)
- Website: .

Bekirlija (Macedonian: Бекирлија) is a village in North Macedonia in the Lozovo Municipality. It is the setting of the Academy Award-nominated documentary film Honeyland, which depicts it as an abandoned village with no electricity and inhabited by one, and then two families.

== Demographics ==
The Yugoslav census of 1953 recorded 161 people of whom 148 were Turks, 71 Macedonians and 12 others. The 1961 Yugoslav census recorded 116 people of whom 77 were Albanians, six Turks, two Bosniaks, one Macedonian and 30 others. The 1971 census recorded 70 people, of whom 33 were Albanians, 15 Turks, eight Bosniaks and 14 others. The 1981 Yugoslav census recorded 25 people, all Turks. The Macedonian census of 1994 recorded 15 people, all Turks. The Macedonian census of 2002 recorded five people, all Turks.

As of the 2021 census, Bekirlija had a single ethnically Turkish resident.
