= Vodovrati =

- Village
- Водоврати
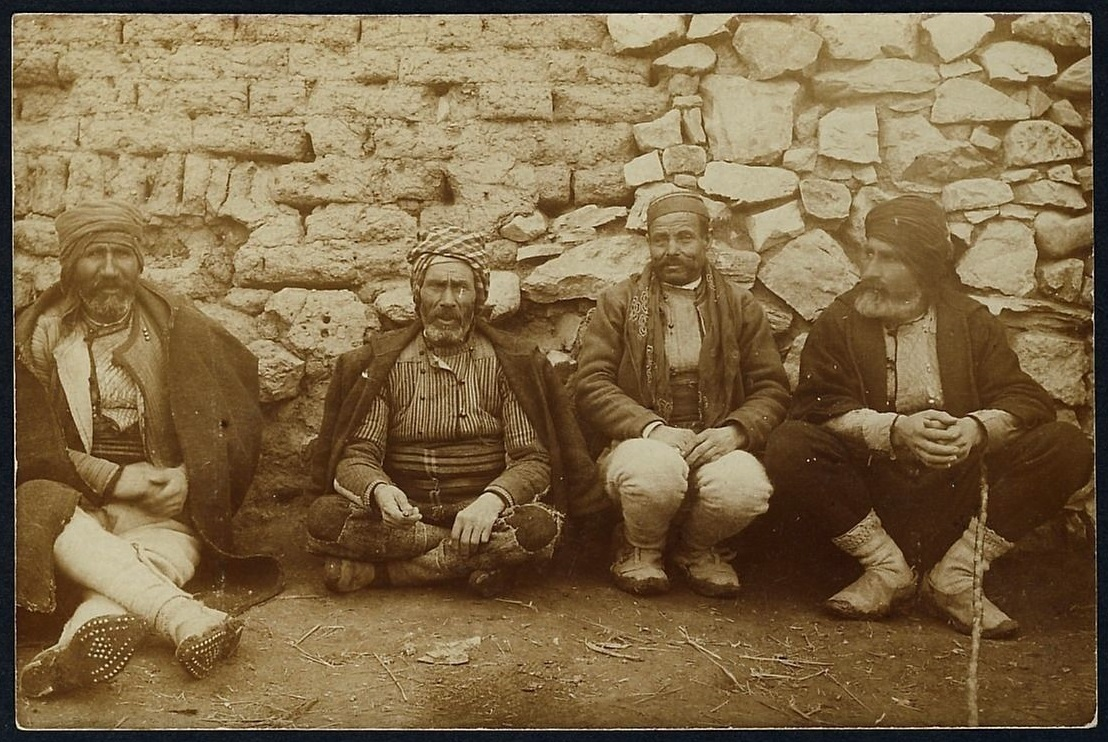
- Village peasants in 1916

- Location within North Macedonia
- Coordinates: 41°35′N 21°53′E
- Country: North Macedonia
- Region: Vardar
- Municipality: Gradsko

Population (2021)
  - Total: 361
- Time zone: UTC+1 (CET)
  - Summer (DST): UTC+2 (CEST)
- Car plates: VE
- Website: .

Vodovrati (Macedonian: Водоврати) is a village in the municipality of Gradsko, North Macedonia.

== History ==
Vodovrati has a history over 500 years. The settlement is recorded as "Vodovrad" in the Ottoman Tahrir Defter number 370 dating to 1530 and as a village of the Köprülü kaza.

== Demographics ==
On the 1927 ethnic map of Leonhard Schulze-Jena, the village is written as Vodovrat and as a fully Muslim Bulgarian village.

As of the 2021 census, Vodovrati had 361 residents with the following ethnic composition:

- Bosniaks 131
- Roma 101
- Macedonians 63
- Turks 24
- Persons for whom data are taken from administrative sources 23
- Others 10
- Albanians 9

According to the 2002 census, the village had a total of 379 inhabitants. Ethnic groups in the village include:

- Bosniaks 192
- Romani 79
- Macedonians 60
- Turks 16
- Albanians 13
- Serbs 4
- Others 15
