= Kuridere =

Kuridere Куридере Kurudere
- Village
- Location within North Macedonia
- Coordinates: 41.6867°N 21.8797°E
- Country: North Macedonia
- Region: Vardar
- Municipality: Gradsko

Population (2002)
  - Total: 130
- Time zone: UTC+1 (CET)
  - Summer (DST): UTC+2 (CEST)
- Car plates: VE
- Website: .

Kuridere (Macedonian: Куридере, Albanian: Kurudere) is a village in the municipality of Gradsko, North Macedonia.

== Demographics ==
According to Vasil Kanchov's statistics ("Macedonia. Ethnography and Statistics") from 1900, Kuru Dere had 312 inhabitants, all Turks.

On his 1927 ethnic map of Leonhard Schulze-Jena, the village is written as Kurudere and as a fully Turkish village.

The settlement last had inhabitants in the 1981 census, where it was recorded as being populated by 1 Albanian.

According to the 2002 census, the village had 0 inhabitants.
