= Kočilari =

Kočilari Кочилари Koçillarë
- Village
- Location within North Macedonia
- Coordinates: 41°40′N 21°52′E
- Country: North Macedonia
- Region: Vardar
- Municipality: Gradsko

Population (2021)
  - Total: 113
- Time zone: UTC+1 (CET)
  - Summer (DST): UTC+2 (CEST)
- Car plates: VE
- Website: .

Kočilari (Macedonian: Кочилари, Albanian: Koçillarë) is a village in the municipality of Gradsko, North Macedonia.

== Demographics ==
On his 1927 ethnic map of Leonhard Schulze-Jena, the village is written as Kodžilar and a fully Turkish village.

As of the 2021 census, Kočilari had 113 residents with the following ethnic composition:

- Albanians 72
- Others (including Torbeš) 15
- Turks 15
- Macedonians 5
- Persons for whom data are taken from administrative sources 5
- Bosniaks 1

According to the 2002 census, the village had 130 inhabitants. Ethnic groups in the village include:

- Albanians 105
- Turks 19
- Macedonians 6
