= Malino, Sveti Nikole =

Малино Малино
- Village
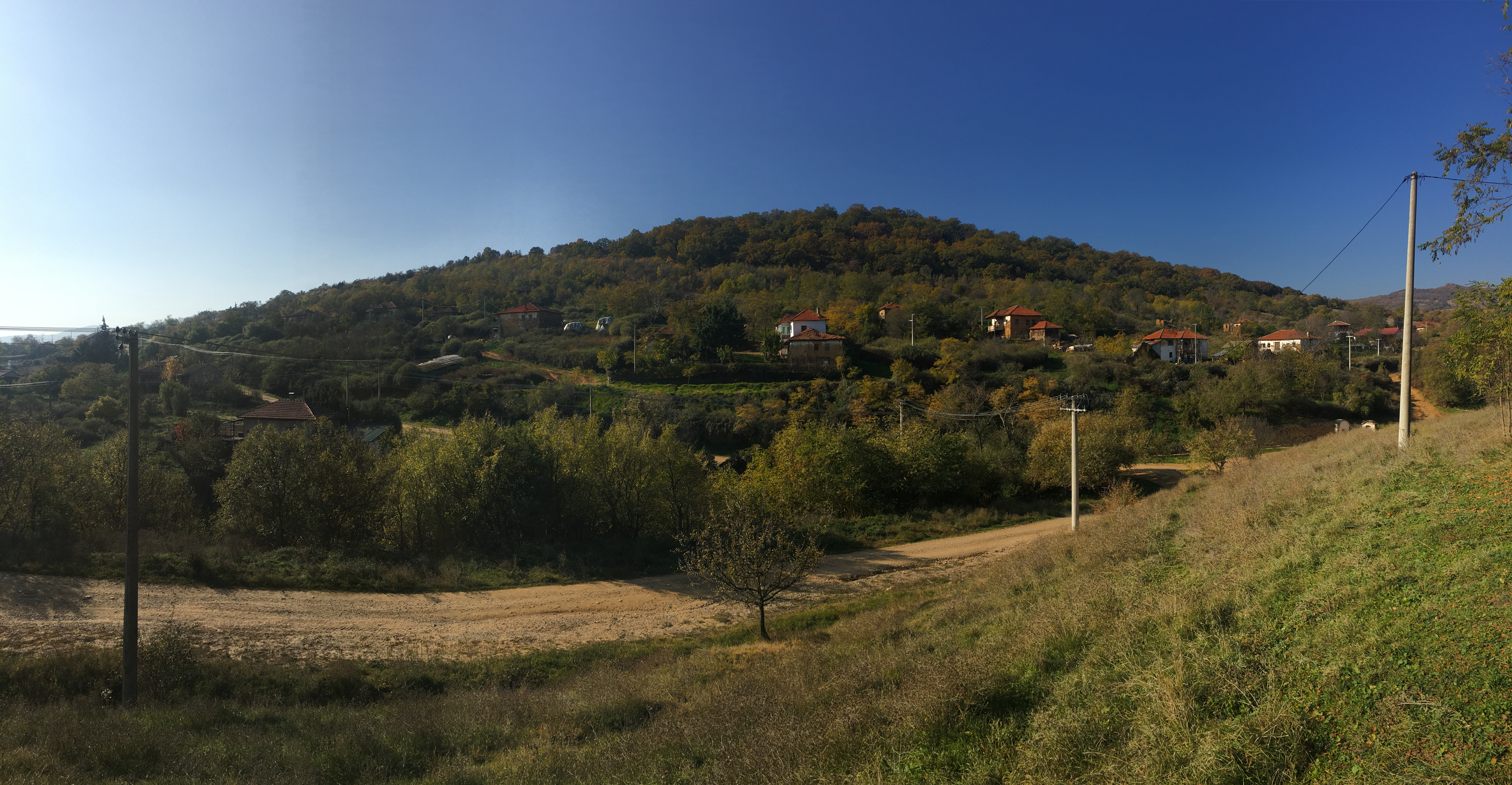
- View of the village

- Location within North Macedonia
- Coordinates: 41°56′57″N 21°50′33″E
- Country: North Macedonia
- Region: Vardar
- Municipality: Sveti Nikole

Population (2021)
  - Total: 20
- Time zone: UTC+1 (CET)
  - Summer (DST): UTC+2 (CEST)
- Website: .

Malino (Macedonian: Малино) is a village in the municipality of Sveti Nikole, North Macedonia.

== Demographics ==
The village has a total population of 20 inhabitants. The ethnic makeup of the village according to the 2021 census is as follows:

- Macedonians 18
- Albanian 2
