= Gradsko, North Macedonia =

Gradsko Градско
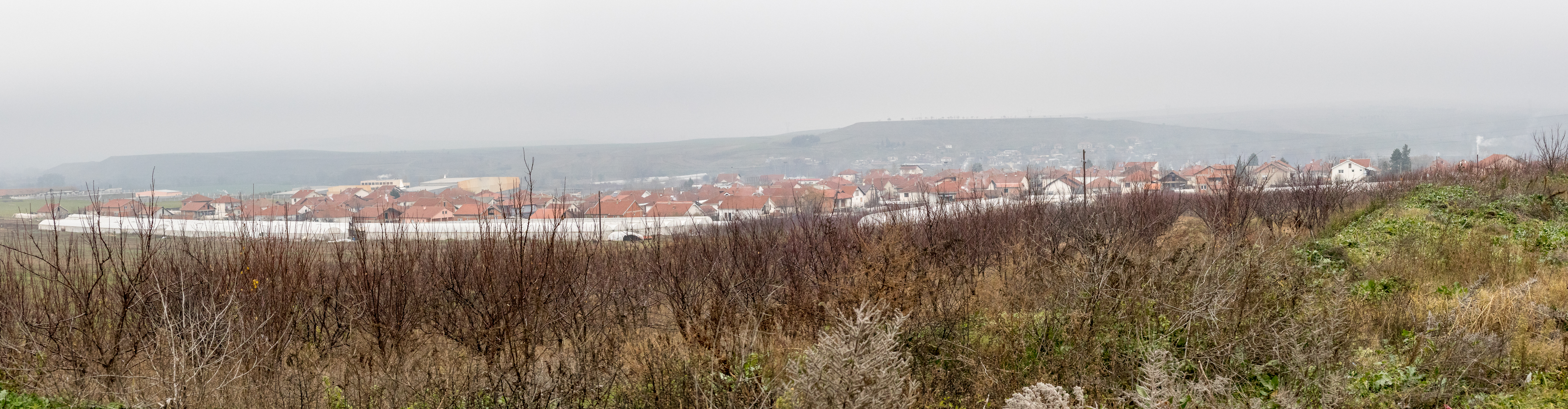
- Panoramic view of the village

- Location within North Macedonia
- Coordinates: 41°34′N 21°56′E
- Country: North Macedonia
- Region: Vardar
- Municipality: Gradsko

Population (2002)
  - Total: 2,219
- Time zone: UTC+1 (CET)
  - Summer (DST): UTC+2 (CEST)
- Postal code: 1420
- Area code: +389 043
- Vehicle registration: VE
- Website: www.Gradsko.gov.mk/

Gradsko (Macedonian: Градско, [ˈɡrat͡sːkɔ]) is a village (despite the word grad meaning "town") located in the central part of North Macedonia. It is the seat of the Gradsko municipality. It is located very close to the main motorway which links Gevgelija on North Macedonia's border with Greece.

== History ==
It was the ancient Paeonian capital of Stobi.

== Demographics ==
On the 1927 ethnic map of Leonhard Schulze-Jena, the village is shown as a Christian Bulgarian village. According to the 2002 census, the village had a total of 2,219 inhabitants. Ethnic groups in the village include:

- Macedonians 1,920
- Turks 7
- Serbs 14
- Romani 48
- Albanians 6
- Bosniaks 215
- Others 9

== Twin towns ==
- Zugló, Hungary, since 2025

== Transport ==
The settlement is served by the Gradsko railway station, with connections from Niš in Serbia to the port of Thessaloniki in Greece on the Aegean Sea (Corridor X), with Intercity services to Skopje and Thessaloniki in Greece.
