= Amzabegovo =

Amzabegovo Амзабегово
- Village
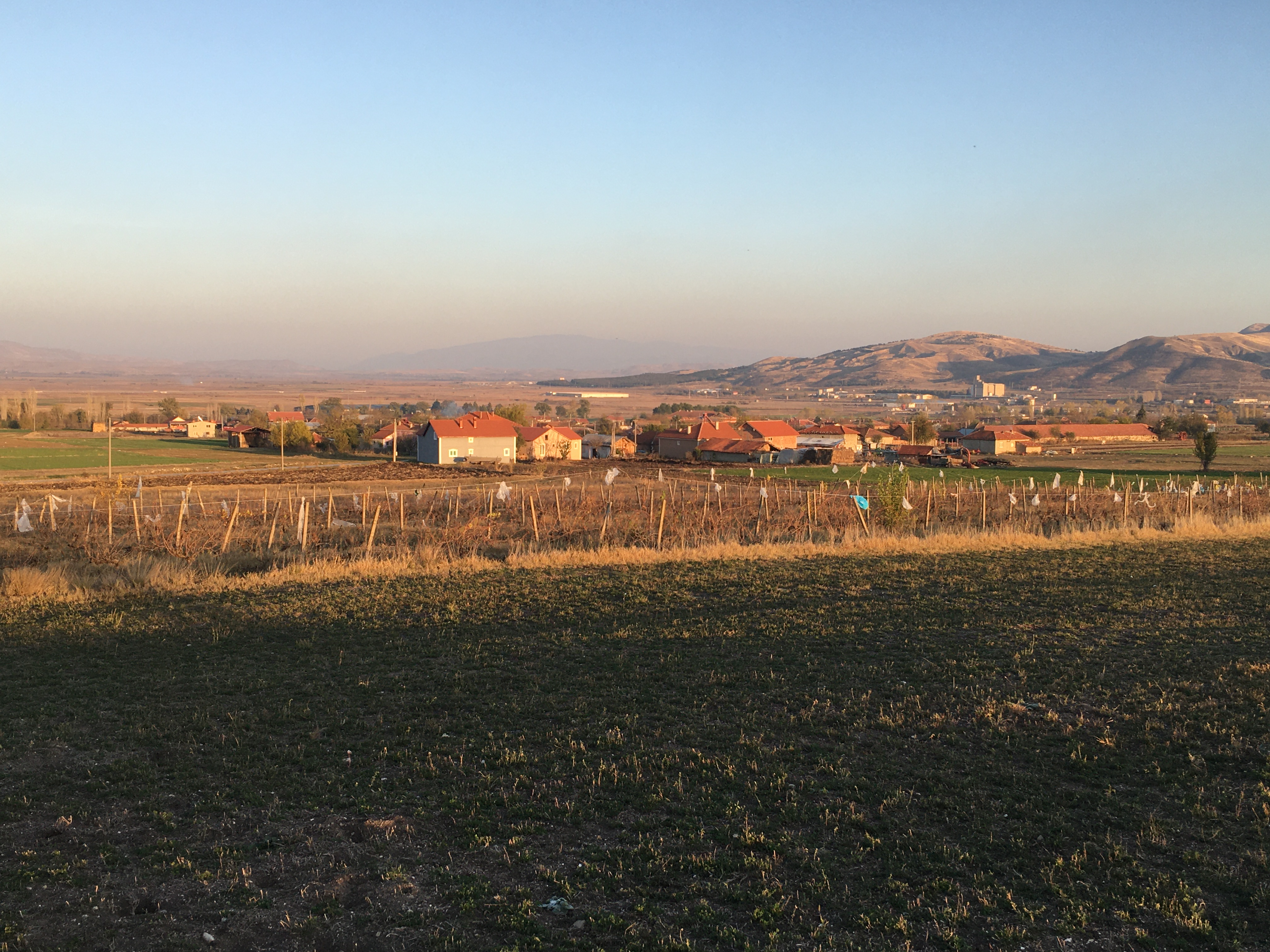
- View of the village

- Location within North Macedonia
- Coordinates: 41.811082°N 21.994143°E
- Country: North Macedonia
- Region: Vardar
- Municipality: Sveti Nikole

Population (2002)
  - Total: 543
- Time zone: UTC+1 (CET)
  - Summer (DST): UTC+2 (CEST)
- Website: .

Amzabegovo (Macedonian: Амзабегово) is a village in the municipality of Sveti Nikole, North Macedonia.

It is home of a barely excavated archaeological site.

== Geography ==
Arnautski Dol, the name of a dry valley in the village, stems from the name Arnaut, the Ottoman Turkish rendering for Albanians, suggesting direct linguistic contact with Albanians or the former presence of an assimilated Albanian community.

== Demographics ==
On the 1927 ethnic map of Leonhard Schulze-Jena, the village is written as "Hamzabegovo" and shown as a Turkish village. According to the 2002 census, the village had a total of 543 inhabitants. Ethnic groups in the village include:

- Macedonians 531
- Serbs 3
- Aromanians 8
- Others 1
