= Peširovo =

Peširovo Пеширово
- Village
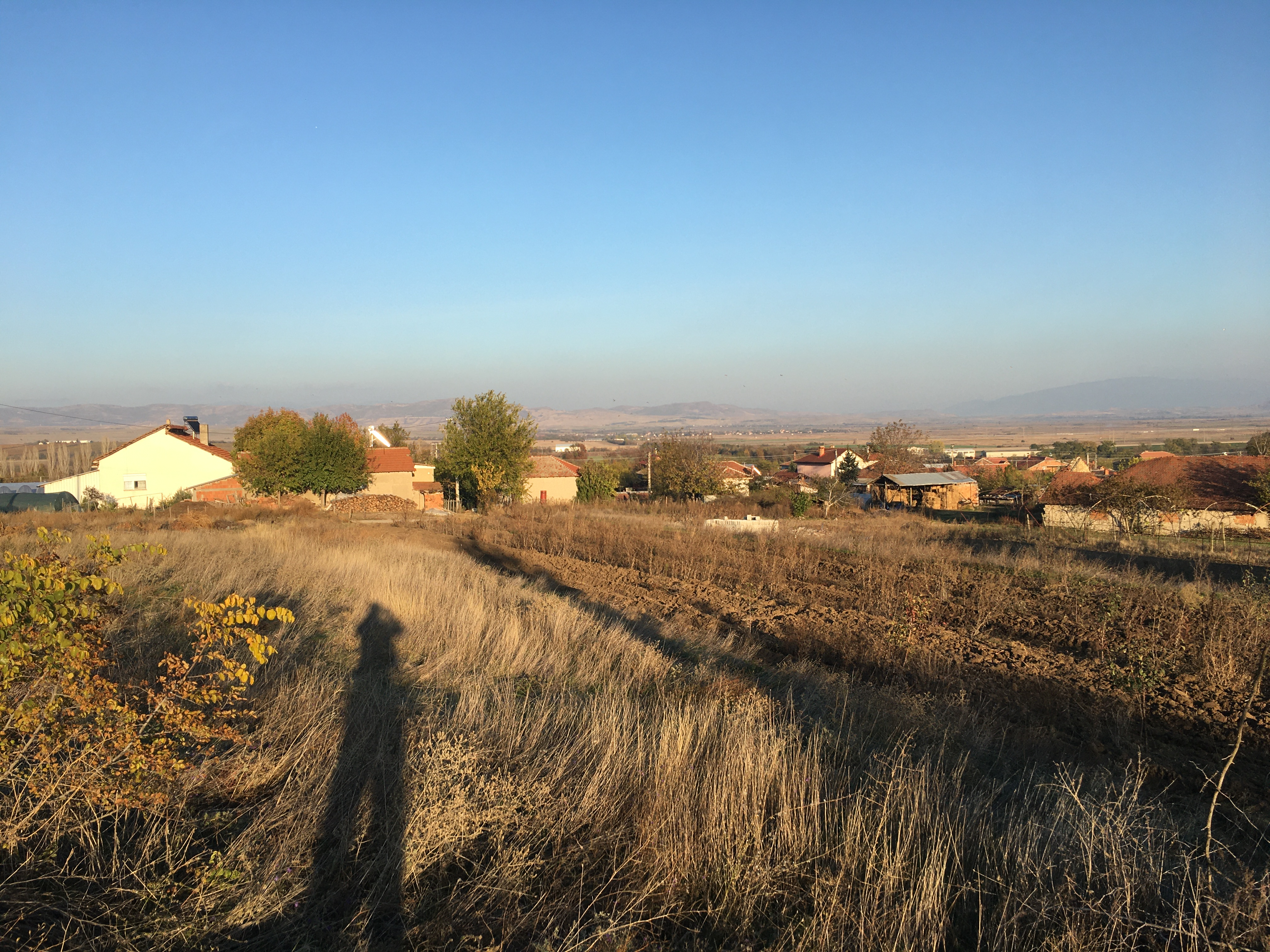

- Location within North Macedonia
- Coordinates: 41.822150°N 21.983967°E
- Country: North Macedonia
- Region: Vardar
- Municipality: Sveti Nikole

Population (2021)
  - Total: 256
- Time zone: UTC+1 (CET)
  - Summer (DST): UTC+2 (CEST)
- Website: .

Peširovo (Macedonian: Пеширово) is a village in the municipality of Sveti Nikole, North Macedonia.

== Demographics ==
On the 1927 ethnic map of Leonhard Schulze-Jena, the village is written as "Bešerli" and shown as a Turkish village. As of the 2021 census, Peširovo had 256 residents with the following ethnic composition:

- Macedonians 198
- Persons for whom data are taken from administrative sources 55
- Others 3

According to the 2002 census, the village had a total of 247 inhabitants. Ethnic groups in the village include:

- Macedonians 247
