= Dolno Crnilište =

Dolno Crnilište Долно Црнилиште
- Village
- Location within North Macedonia
- Coordinates: 41.816505°N 21.955648°E
- Country: North Macedonia
- Region: Vardar
- Municipality: Sveti Nikole

Population (2002)
  - Total: 114
- Time zone: UTC+1 (CET)
  - Summer (DST): UTC+2 (CEST)
- Website: .

Dolno Crnilište (Macedonian: Долно Црнилиште) is a village in the municipality of Sveti Nikole, North Macedonia.

== Demographics ==
According to the 2002 census, the village had a total of 114 inhabitants. Ethnic groups in the village include:

- Macedonians 114
