= Erdželija =

Erdželija Ерџелија
- Village
- Location within North Macedonia
- Coordinates: 41.833612°N 22.035065°E
- Country: North Macedonia
- Region: Vardar
- Municipality: Sveti Nikole

Population (2002)
  - Total: 1,012
- Time zone: UTC+1 (CET)
  - Summer (DST): UTC+2 (CEST)
- Website: .

Erdželija (Macedonian: Ерџелија) is a village in the municipality of Sveti Nikole, North Macedonia.

== Demographics ==
On the 1927 ethnic map of Leonhard Schulze-Jena, the village is written as "Erdželi" and shown as a Bulgarian Christian village. According to the 2002 census, the village had a total of 1,012 inhabitants. Ethnic groups in the village include:

- Macedonians 979
- Aromanians 31
- Others 2
