= Dobrica Matković =

Serbian politician

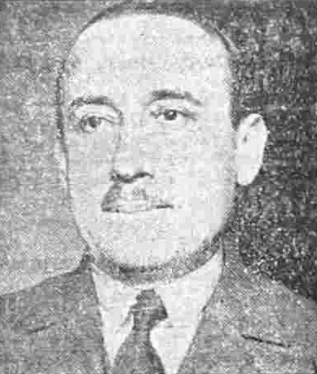
Matković in 1933

Dobrica Matković (Serbian Cyrillic: Добрица Матковић; 29 November 1887 – 9 October 1973) was a Serbian veteran of the World War I and a politician. Appointed as head of the Department for State Protection in 1929, he served as governor of the Danube Banovina between 1933 and 1935, and governor of the Morava Banovina between 1935 and 1936.

Born in Gornji Milanovac, Kingdom of Serbia, Matković served in the Serbian army during World War I. He retreated through Albania with the army. Matković became the veliki župan (head) of Bregalnica County in the Kingdom of Yugoslavia. He ordered and oversaw the massacre of 28-29 male inhabitants by Yugoslav regular troops in the village of Garvan on 3 March 1923. Historian Yves Tomic estimated the number of casualties as 53. The massacre was done in retaliation to an attack by the Internal Macedonian Revolutionary Organization against the Serbian colony of Kadrifakovo (resulting in 23-26 casualties and 15 wounded people) or the killing of 2 Yugoslav soldiers in Garvan.

He died long after the end of the wars and was buried in Savinac.

== See also ==
- Miloš Obrenović I, Prince of Serbia
- Danube Banovina
