= Koritos =

Koritos/Korytos or Koryton (Greek: Κορυτός/Κορυτόν; Macedonian: Коритос / Коритон) was a medieval city-fortress on the road Skopje - Strumica away one day walk from Skopje, North Macedonia. The Arab geographer al-Idrisi mentions the city as Kurta. The city is mentioned only in two sources from the 12th and 13th centuries, and is identified with Ovče Pole's Ǵurište. Some historians believe that this city was actually Kratovo, and that this is actually the name of the medieval city.
