= Gorno Crnilište =

Gorno Crnilište Горно Црнилиште
- Village
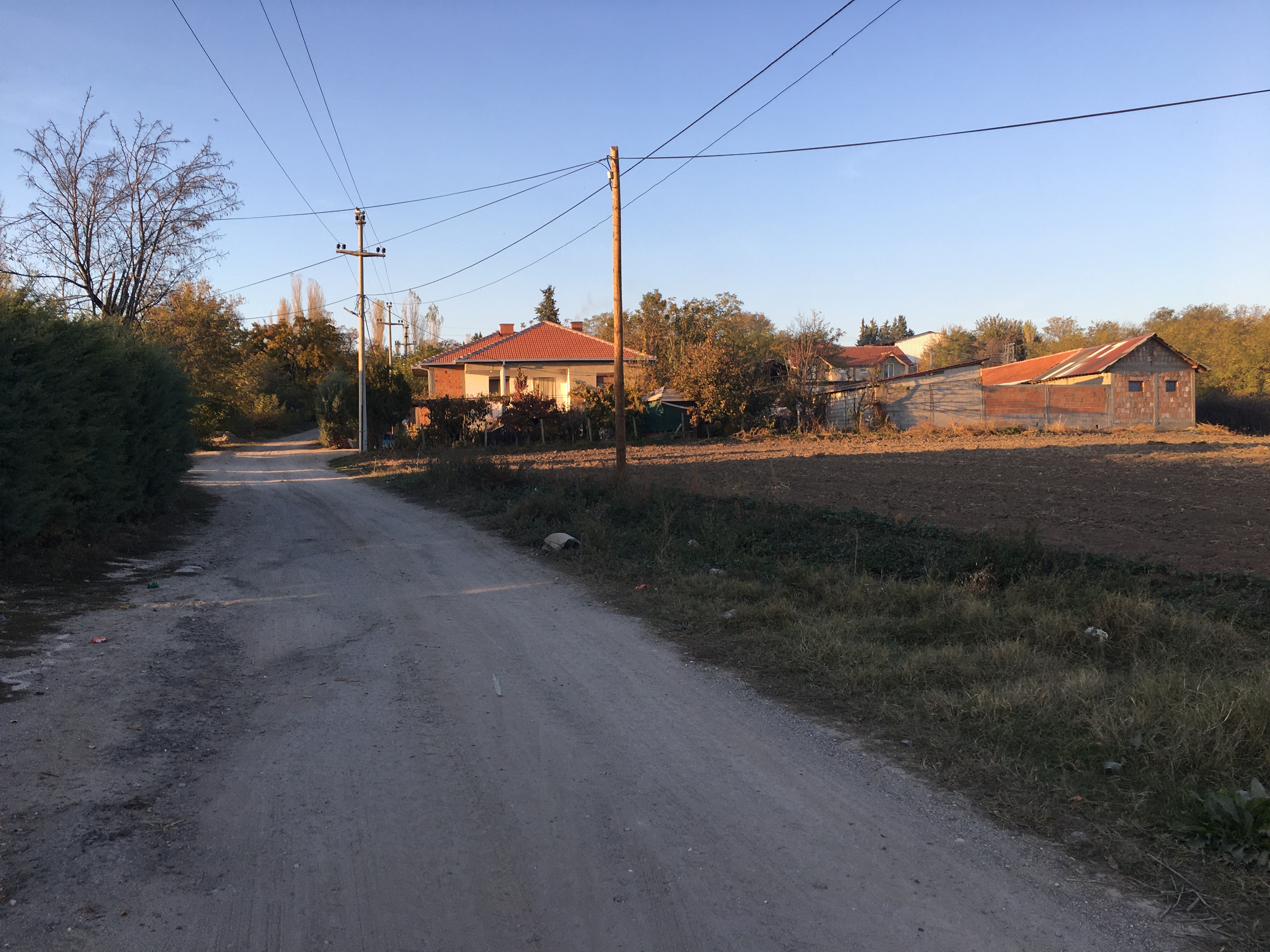

- Location within North Macedonia
- Coordinates: 41.816501°N 21.965162°E
- Country: North Macedonia
- Region: Vardar
- Municipality: Sveti Nikole

Population (2021)
  - Total: 373
- Time zone: UTC+1 (CET)
  - Summer (DST): UTC+2 (CEST)
- Website: .

Gorno Crnilište (Macedonian: Горно Црнилиште) is a village in the municipality of Sveti Nikole, North Macedonia.

== Demographics ==
As of the 2021 census, Gorno Crnilište had 373 residents with the following ethnic composition:

- Macedonians 357
- Persons for whom data are taken from administrative sources 16

According to the 2002 census, the village had a total of 345 inhabitants. Ethnic groups in the village include:

- Macedonians 345
