= Karatmanovo =

Karatmanovo Каратманово
- Village
- Location within North Macedonia
- Coordinates: 41.763169°N 21.867770°E
- Country: North Macedonia
- Region: Vardar
- Municipality: Lozovo

Population (2002)
  - Total: 520
- Time zone: UTC+1 (CET)
  - Summer (DST): UTC+2 (CEST)
- Website: .

Karatmanovo (Macedonian: Каратманово) is a village in the municipality of Lozovo, North Macedonia.

== Demographics ==
According to the 2002 census, the village had a total of 520 inhabitants. Ethnic groups in the village include:

- Macedonians 515
- Turks 5
