= Saramzalino =

Saramzalino Сарамзалино
- Village
- Location within North Macedonia
- Coordinates: 41.788449°N 21.942409°E
- Country: North Macedonia
- Region: Vardar
- Municipality: Lozovo

Population (2002)
  - Total: 118
- Time zone: UTC+1 (CET)
  - Summer (DST): UTC+2 (CEST)
- Website: .

Saramzalino (Macedonian: Сарамзалино) is a village in the municipality of Lozovo, North Macedonia.

== Demographics ==
According to the 2002 census, the village had a total of 118 inhabitants. Ethnic groups in the village include:

- Macedonians 116
- Serbs 2
