= Gorobinci =

Gorobinci Горобинци
- Village
- Location within North Macedonia
- Coordinates: 41.875152°N 21.876011°E
- Country: North Macedonia
- Region: Vardar
- Municipality: Sveti Nikole

Population (2002)
  - Total: 820
- Time zone: UTC+1 (CET)
  - Summer (DST): UTC+2 (CEST)
- Website: .

Gorobinci (Macedonian: Горобинци) is a village in the municipality of Sveti Nikole, North Macedonia.

== Etymology and names ==
Several etymology has been proposed. J. Zaimov proposed it derived from an old nickname Gorobija, composing of gora (hill) and bije. Olga Ivanova, however, proposed a connection with a substratum word groapă (pit, grave). Ljubica Stankovska, an onomastician, considered the toponym a derivative of ancient Slavic personal name beginning with *gor-(mountain).

== Demographics ==
On the 1927 ethnic map of Leonhard Schulze-Jena, the village is shown as a Turkish village. According to the 2002 census, the village had a total of 820 inhabitants. Ethnic groups in the village include:

- Macedonians 811
- Serbs 8
- Turks 1

According to the 2021 census, the village had a total of 602 inhabitants.

- Macedonians 567
- Serbs 10
- Albanians 1
