= Kišino =

Kišino Кишино Kishinë
- Village
- Location within North Macedonia
- Coordinates: 41.708333°N 21.911944°E
- Country: North Macedonia
- Region: Vardar
- Municipality: Lozovo

Population (2021)
  - Total: 8
- Time zone: UTC+1 (CET)
  - Summer (DST): UTC+2 (CEST)
- Website: .

Kišino (Macedonian: Кишино; Albanian: Kishinë) is a village in North Macedonia in the Lozovo Municipality.

== Demographics ==
As of the 2021 census, Kišino had 8 residents with the following ethnic composition:

- Albanians 2
- PWDTAS 6
