= Arbasanci =

Arbasanci Арбасанци
- Village
- Location within North Macedonia
- Coordinates: 41.8903°N 22.0847°E
- Country: North Macedonia
- Region: Vardar
- Municipality: Sveti Nikole

Population (2002)
  - Total: 1
- Time zone: UTC+1 (CET)
  - Summer (DST): UTC+2 (CEST)
- Website: .

Arbasanci (Macedonian: Арбасанци) is a village in the municipality of Sveti Nikole, North Macedonia.

It is home of a barely excavated archaeological site.

== Name ==
The name is derived from the medieval ethnonym of Albanians, Arban.

== Demographics ==
On the 1927 ethnic map of Leonhard Schulze-Jena, the village is written as "Arabasanci" and shown as without an ethnic marker. According to the 2002 census, the village had 1 inhabitant. Ethnic groups in the village include:

- Macedonians 1
