= Lozovo Municipality =

Municipality of North Macedonia

Coordinates: 41°46′51″N 21°54′04″E

Municipality of Lozovo Општина Лозово
- Rural municipality
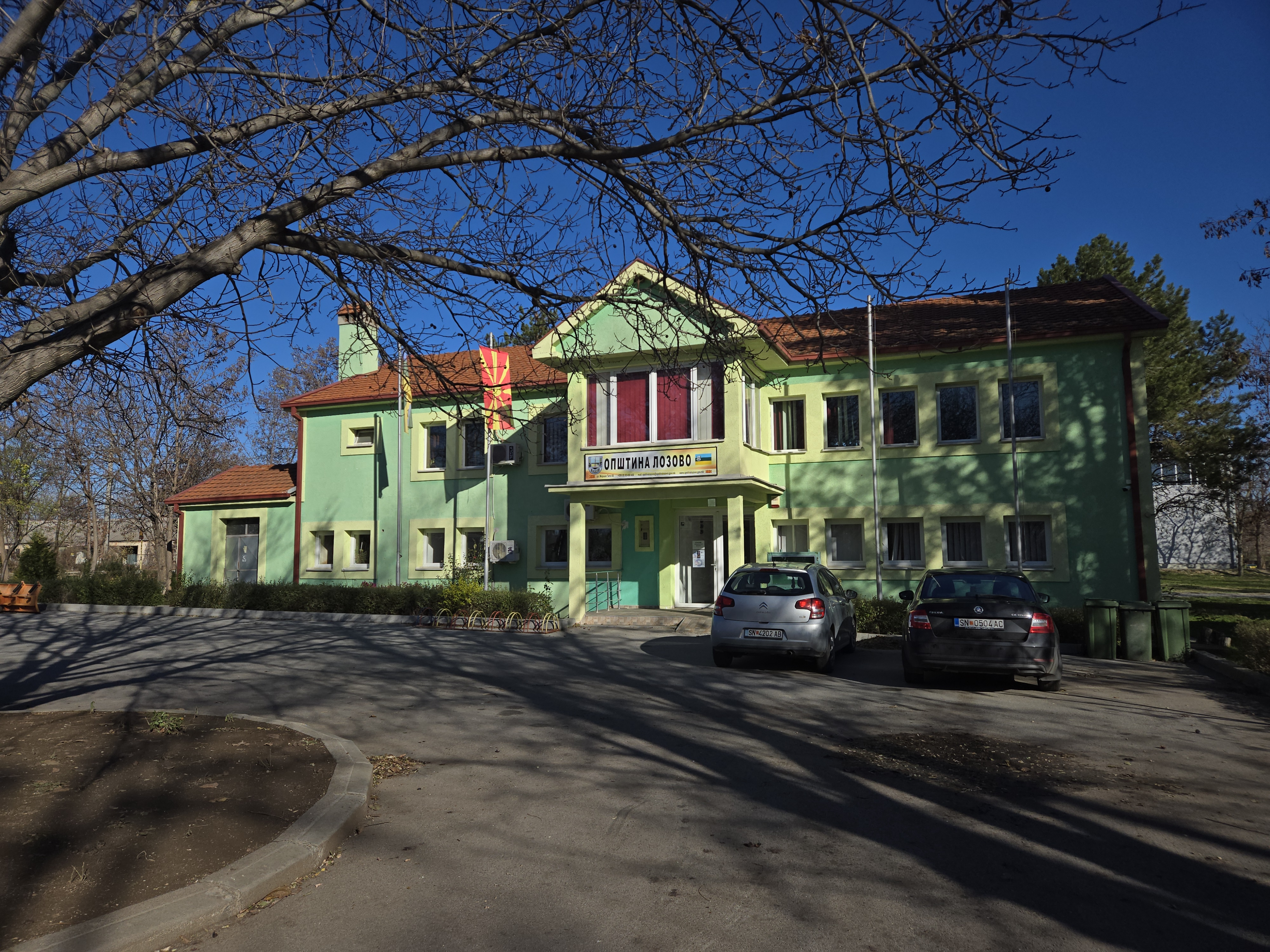
- Lozovo Municipality Building

- Flag Coat of arms

- Country: North Macedonia
- Region: Vardar
- Municipal seat: Lozovo

Government
  - Mayor: Boško Cvetkovski (VMRO-DPMNE)

Area
  - Total: 166.32 km^{2} (64.22 sq mi)

Population
  - Total: 2,264
  - Density: 17.18/km^{2} (44.5/sq mi)
- Time zone: UTC+1 (CET)
- Postal code: 2208
- Area code: 032
- Vehicle registration: SN
- Website: http://www.OpstinaLozovo.gov.mk

Lozovo (Macedonian: Лозово) is a municipality in eastern North Macedonia. Lozovo is also the name of the village where the municipal seat is found. Lozovo Municipality is part of the Vardar Statistical Region.

== Geography ==
The municipality borders Sveti Nikole Municipality to the north, Štip Municipality to the east, Veles Municipality to the west and Gradsko Municipality to the south.

== Demographics ==
According to the 2021 North Macedonia census, Lozovo Municipality has 2,264 residents. Ethnic groups in the municipality:

	2002		2021	
	Number	%	Number	%
TOTAL	2,858	100	2,264	100
Macedonians	2,471	86.49	1,887	83.35
Turks	157	5.49	203	8.97
Vlachs	122	4.27	42	1.86
Albanians	35	1.22	20	0.88
Serbs	27	0.94	20	0.88
Bosniaks	34	1.19	17	0.75
Other / Undeclared / Unknown	12	0.4	5	0.22
Persons for whom data are taken from administrative sources			70	3.09

== Inhabited places ==
The number of the inhabited places in the municipality is 11.

Inhabited places in Lozovo Municipality
Village(s): Adžibegovo | Adžimatovo | Bekirloja | Durfulija | Gjuzemelci | Karatmanovo | Kišino | Lozovo | Milino | Saramzalino | Kjoselari |
