= Durfulija =

Durfulija Дорфулија
- Village
- Location within North Macedonia
- Coordinates: 41.765537°N 21.892780°E
- Country: North Macedonia
- Region: Vardar
- Municipality: Lozovo

Population (2002)
  - Total: 756
- Time zone: UTC+1 (CET)
  - Summer (DST): UTC+2 (CEST)
- Website: .

Durfulija (Macedonian: Дорфулија) is a village in the municipality of Lozovo, North Macedonia.

== Demographics ==
According to the 2002 census, the village had a total of 756 inhabitants. Ethnic groups in the village include:

- Macedonians 569
- Turks 118
- Serbs 18
- Aromanians 49
- Others 2
