= Ovče Pole =

Plain in North Macedonia

Coordinates: 41°51′54″N 21°56′34″E

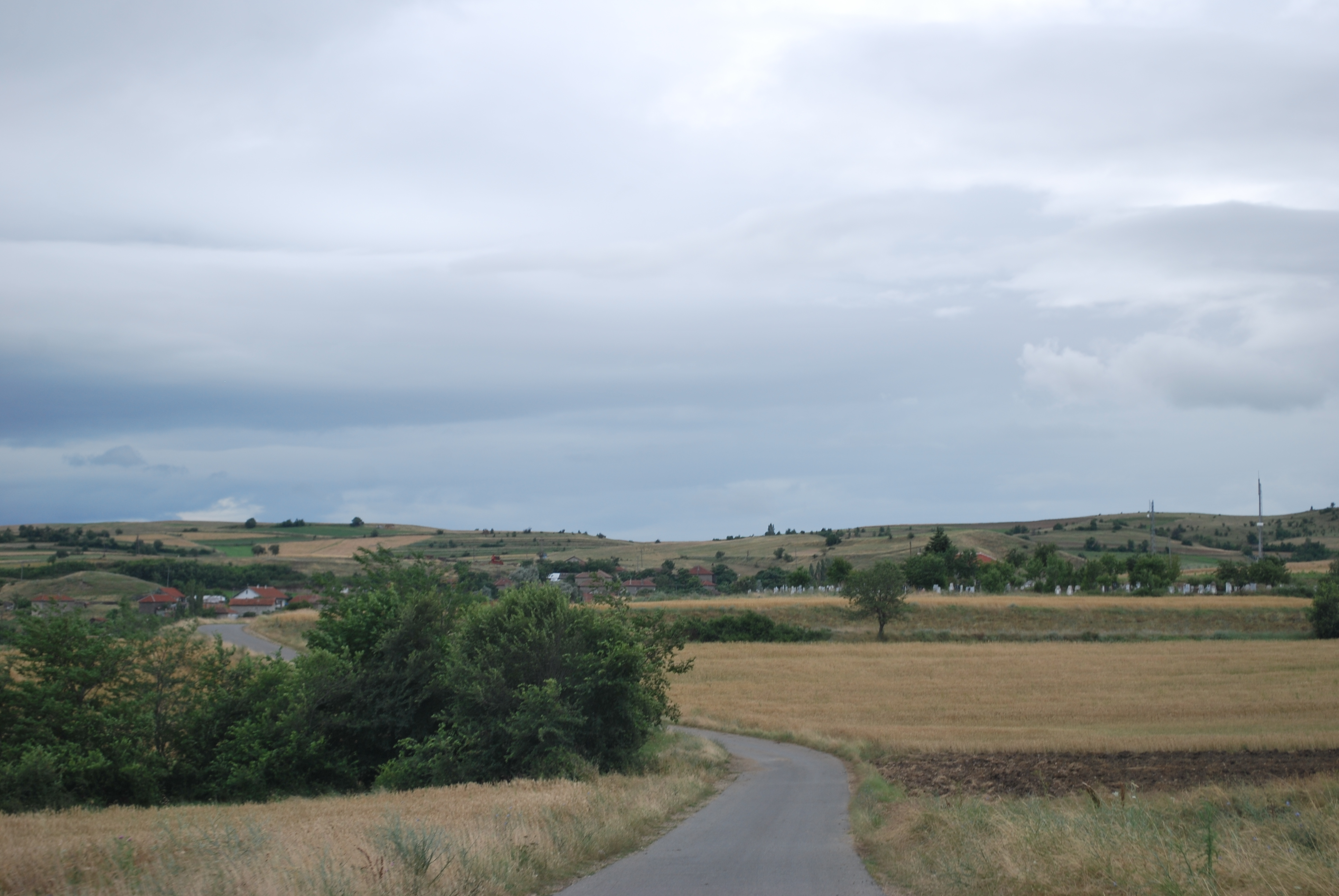
Ovče Pole, near the village of Gorobinci

Ovče Pole (Macedonian: Овче Поле, lit. 'sheep plain') is a plain near Sveti Nikole's river, which is a tributary of the Bregalnica river in east-central North Macedonia.

== History ==
The Battle of Ovche Pole occurred during the First World War between 14 October and 15 November 1915.

== Geography ==
=== Climate ===
The climate of the plain is characterized by hot and dry summers and temperately cold winters, with occasional sharp lows. The highest registered temperature in the plain was 44.0C and the lowest registered temperature was -23.0C. Strong winds from the north-west, north, south-east are specific for this region and are present for most of the year, this being the reason the area to be called "the windiest place on the Balkans". The Ovče Pole plain is one of the driest areas in Europe and is plagued by frequent drought periods. The yearly average of rainfall is in the 400-500 ml/m2 range. The average elevation of the plain is 200–400 m, and the highest place is Gjurište, with an elevation of 856m above sea level. In the region of Alin Dol of the river Mavrovica, in 1981, an artificial dam was built. Its water is used for the water supply of the city of Sveti Nikole.

=== Important Bird Area ===
A 41,000 ha tract of the plain has been designated an Important Bird Area (IBA) by BirdLife International because it supports populations of eastern imperial eagles, European rollers, lesser kestrels and lesser grey shrikes.
