= Nemanjica =

Nemanjica Немањица
- Village
- Location within North Macedonia
- Coordinates: 41.914546°N 22.015596°E
- Country: North Macedonia
- Region: Vardar
- Municipality: Sveti Nikole

Population (2002)
  - Total: 201
- Time zone: UTC+1 (CET)
  - Summer (DST): UTC+2 (CEST)
- Website: .

Nemanjica (Macedonian: Немањица) is a village in the municipality of Sveti Nikole, North Macedonia.

== Demographics ==
On the 1927 ethnic map of Leonhard Schulze-Jena, the village is shown as a Christian Bulgarian village. According to the 2002 census, the village had a total of 201 inhabitants. Ethnic groups in the village include:

- Macedonians 199
- Serbs 1
