= Mavrovica =

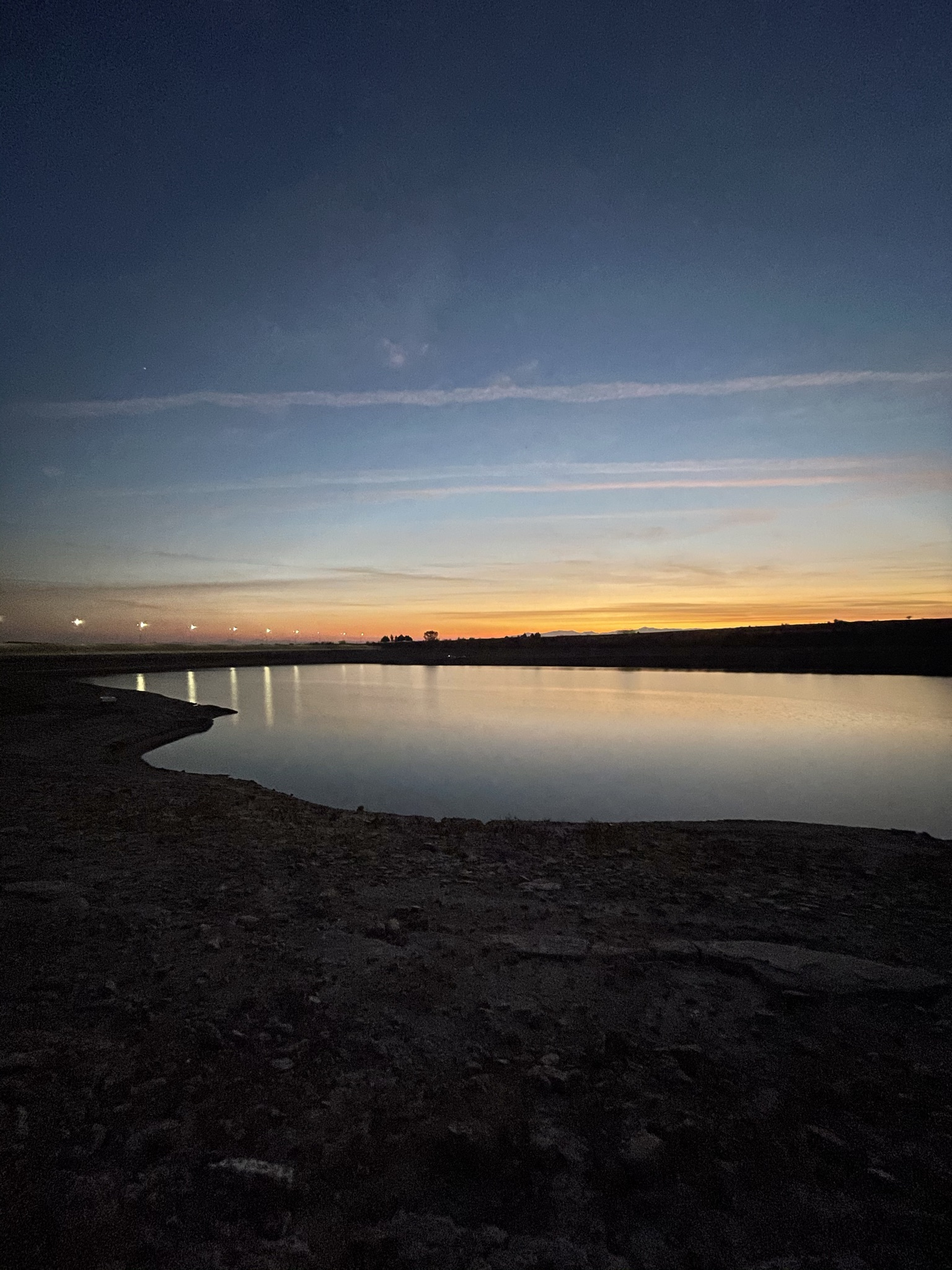
- View of the lake with the dam
- Interactive map of Mavrovica
- Coordinates: 41°54′52″N 21°58′59″E
- Type: Аrtificial lake
- Primary inflows: Mavrovica (eagle river)
- Primary outflows: Mavrovica (eagle river)
- Basin countries: North Macedonia
- Water volume: 2,800,000 m^{3} (99,000,000 cu ft)

Mavrovica (sometimes called Eagle) is an artificial lake built on the river of the same name near the village of Nemanjici, North Macedonia. The accumulation is created through an earth dam with a height of 25 metres (82 ft).

== Location ==
Every north of the town of Sveti Nikole, and south of the village of Orel, but still enters the Atar borders of the village of Nemanjici.

== Features ==
The lake has a volume of 2.8 million cubic metres (99×10^{6} cu ft). Used for watering and water management. The lake is a famous fishing destination, and there are species of fish such as catfish, carp, amur, linden, perch, chub, and red fin, and the most interesting is that there are freshwater jellyfish in the lake. An international fishing carp fishing competition with a bottom hook is also held on the lake shore, catch and release "according to the pattern"

== Gallery ==
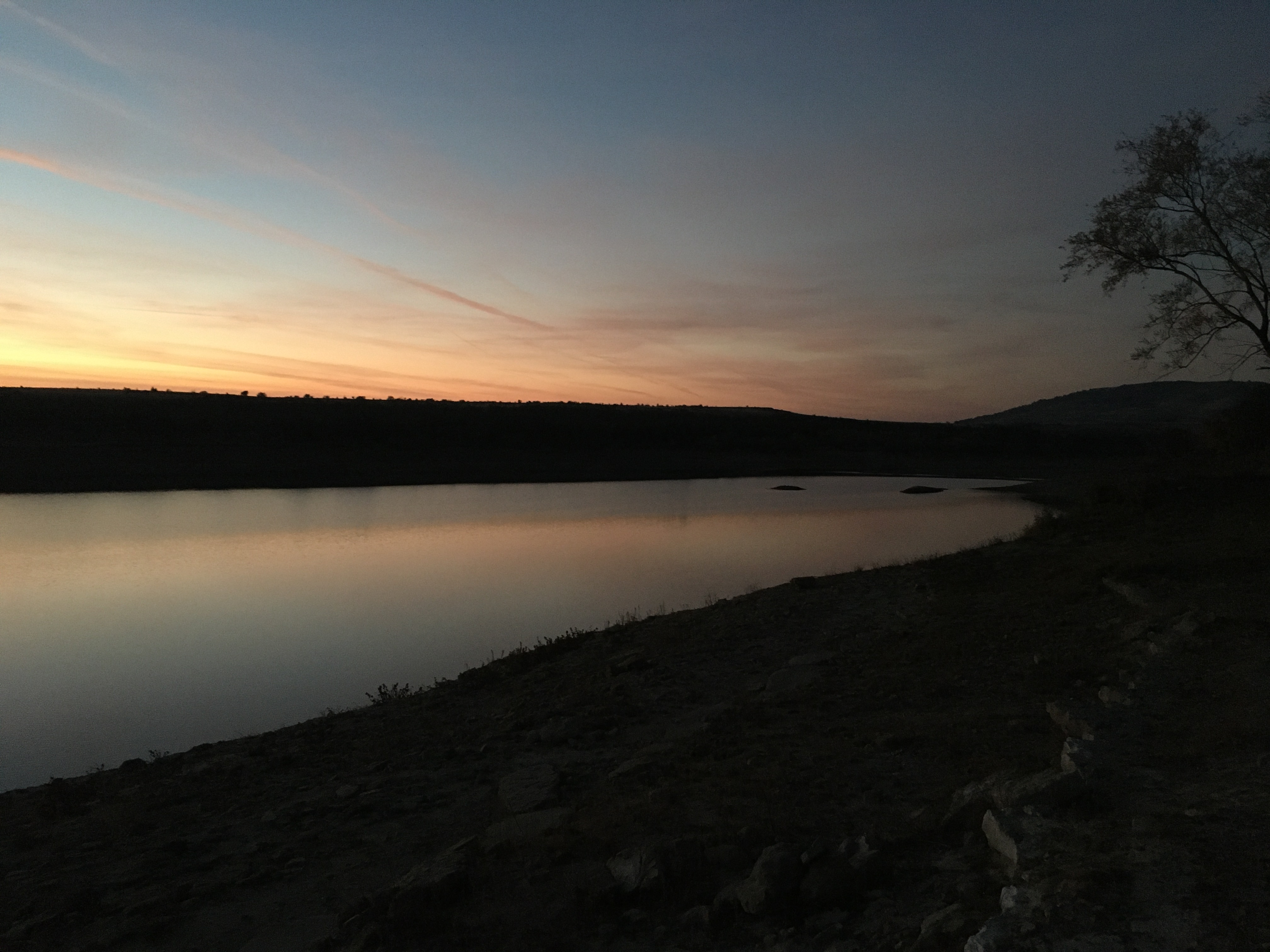
View of the lake

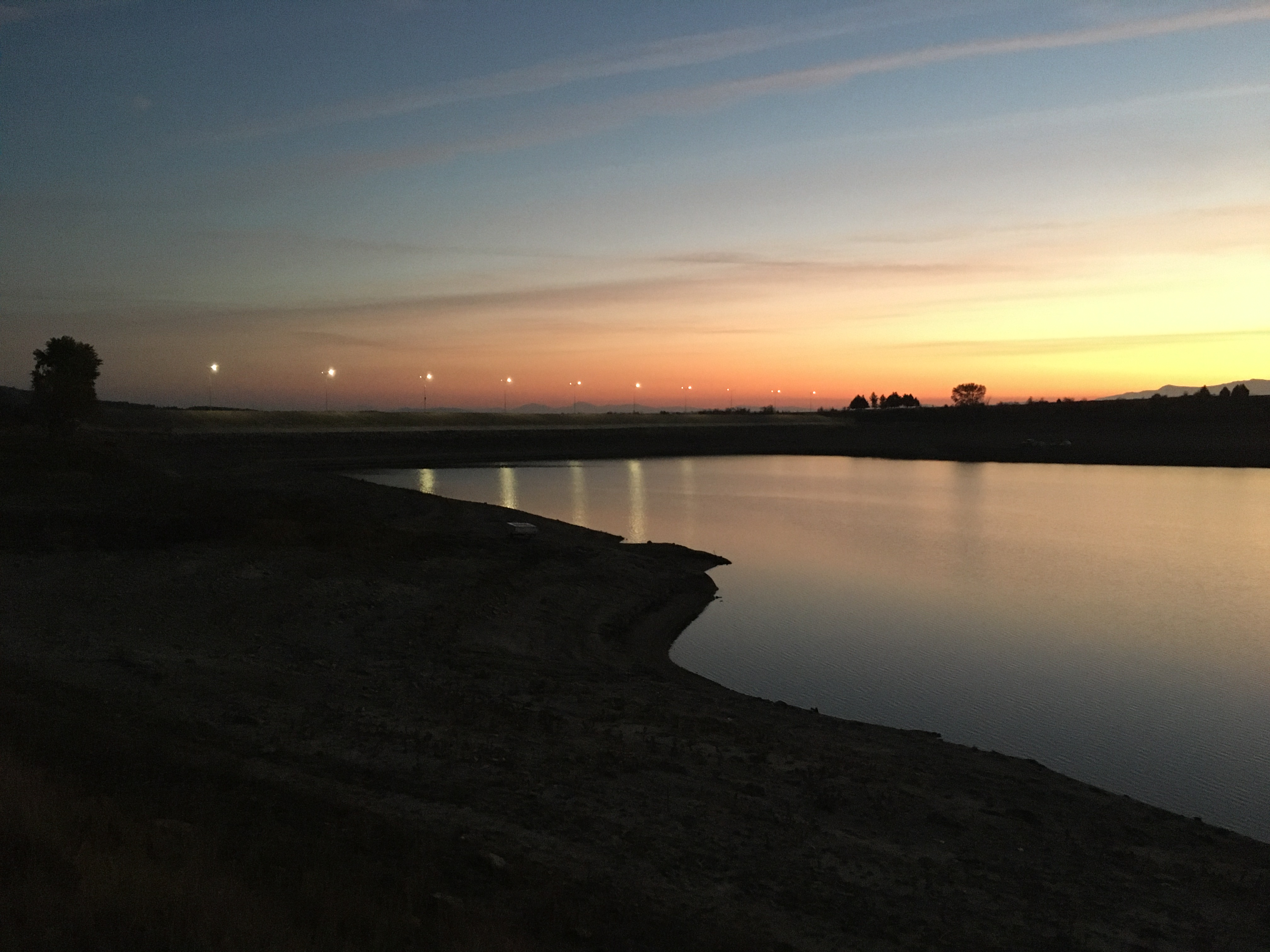
View of the dam

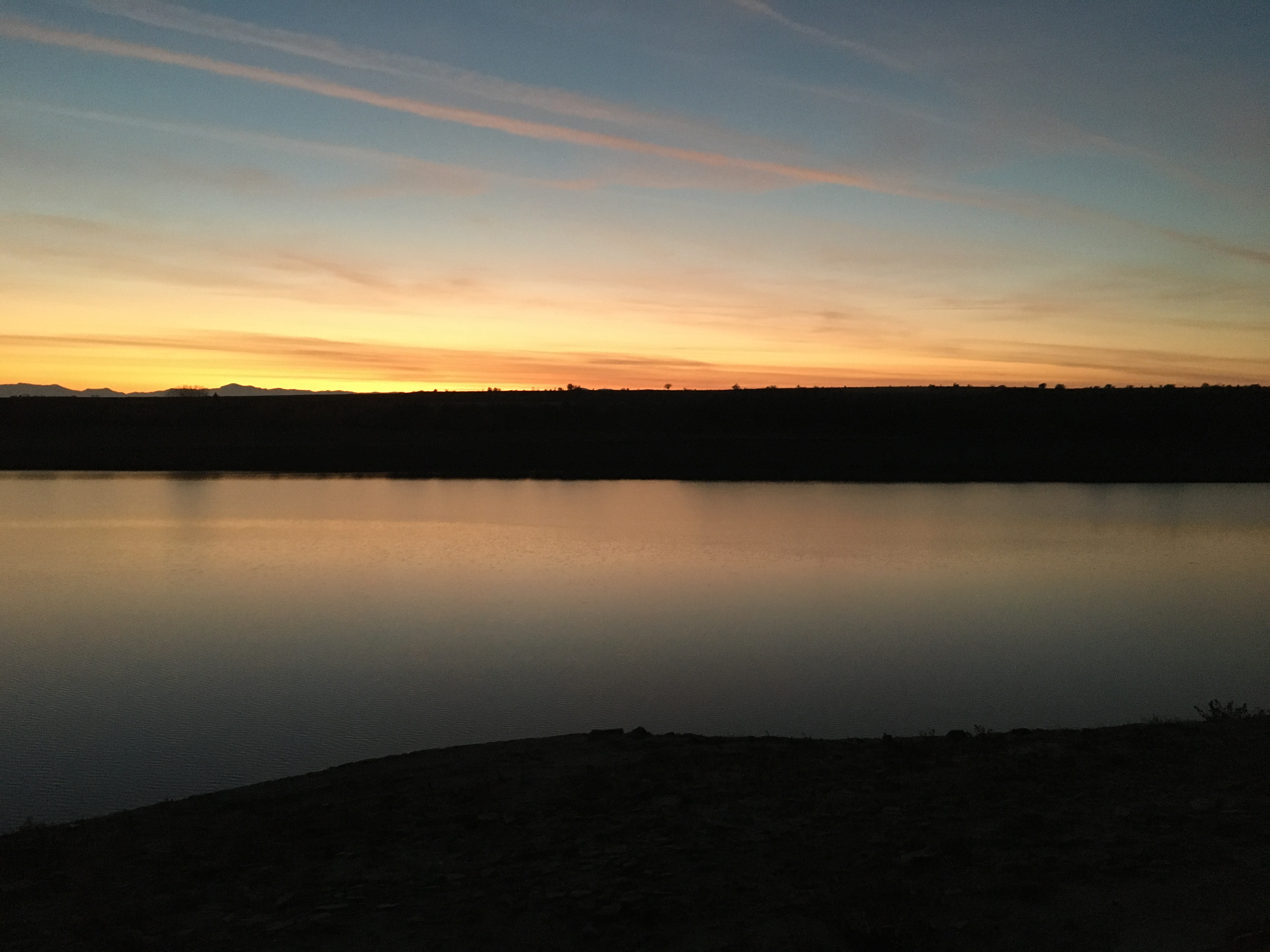
View of the lake
