= Macedonians in Bosnia and Herzegovina =

Macedonians in Bosnia and Herzegovina Македонци во Босна и Херцеговина Makedonci u Bosni i Hercegovini Македонци у Босни и Херцеговини
Total population
- 738 (2013 census)

Regions with significant populations
- Sarajevo, Banja Luka

Languages
- Macedonian, Bosnian, Croatian; Serbian

Religion
- predominantly Eastern Orthodox; all other religions present in North Macedonia

Related ethnic groups
- Macedonians

Macedonians in Bosnia and Herzegovina refers to the group of ethnic Macedonians who reside in Bosnia and Herzegovina.

According to the last Yugoslav census in Bosnia and Herzegovina of 1991, there were 1,596 Macedonians in the country.

The 2013 census counted 738 members of the Macedonian national minority.

== History ==
Macedonians started migrating to the territory of today's Bosnia and Herzegovina at the beginning of the 20th century.

A new wave of Macedonians followed in the period after the Second World War, when both Bosnia and Herzegovina and North Macedonia were part of the newly established Socialist Federal Republic of Yugoslavia.

The Macedonians mainly settled in towns, namely Banja Luka, Sarajevo, Zenica, Bijeljina, Doboj, Derventa, Mostar, Zvornik, Prijedor and other places.

== Organizations ==
The Macedonians of Bosnia and Herzegovina have established two organizations, the first one was established in Sarajevo in 1992. The other one, the Association of Macedonians of the Republic of Srpska, was founded in 2002 and is based in Banja Luka.

== See also ==
- Bosnia and Herzegovina–North Macedonia relations
- Ethnic groups of Bosnia and Herzegovina
- Macedonian diaspora
- Bosniaks in North Macedonia
