= Bosnia and Herzegovina–North Macedonia relations =

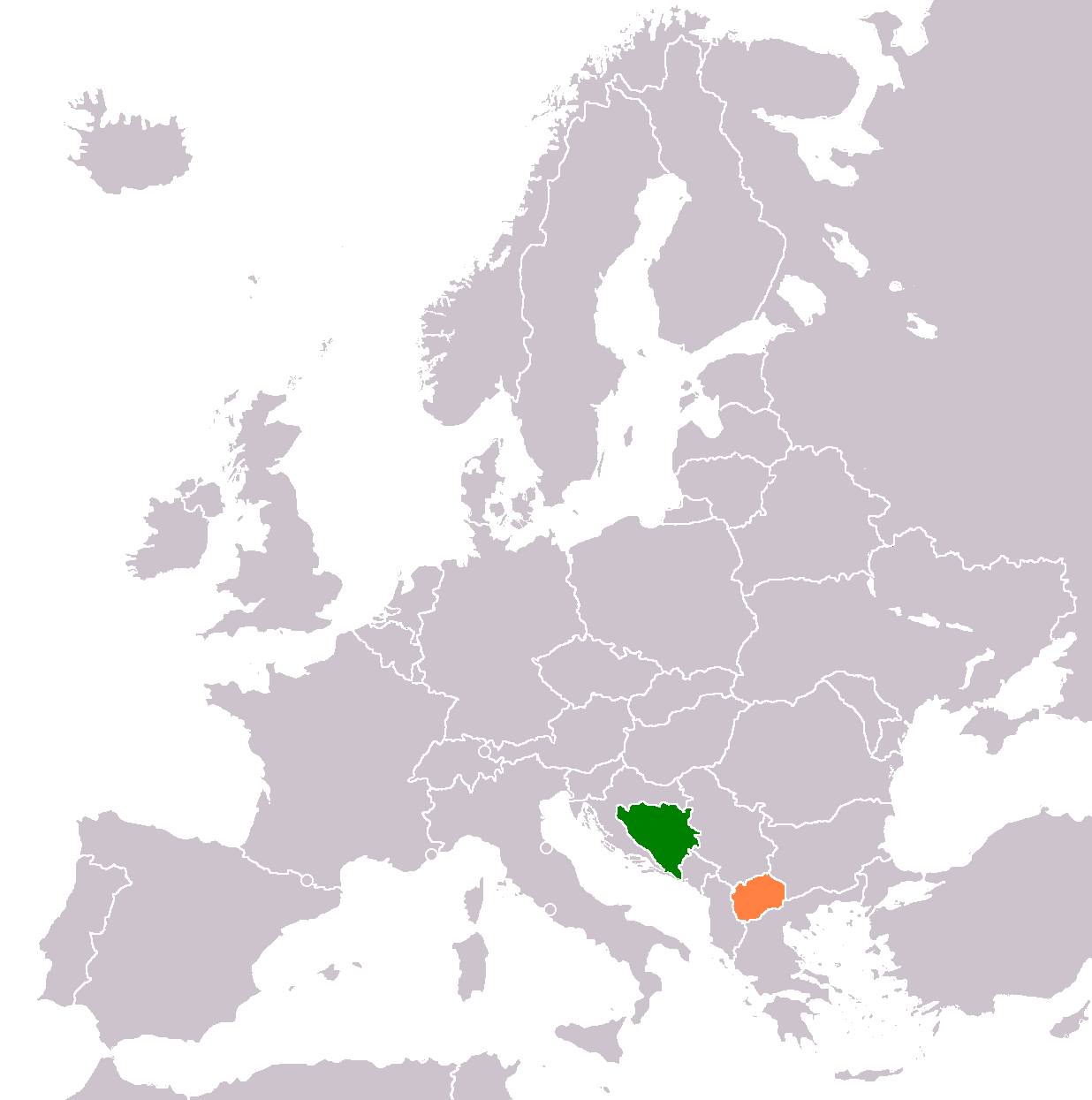

- Bosnia and Herzegovina: North Macedonia

The relations between Bosnia and Herzegovina and North Macedonia are very good, without any open issues between them.

== History of relations ==
Until 1991, North Macedonia and Bosnia and Herzegovina were both constituent republics of the Socialist Federal Republic of Yugoslavia. When Yugoslavia started disintegrating, North Macedonia declared independence from Yugoslavia in September 1991. Bosnia and Herzegovina declared its independence in March 1992. Diplomatic relations between the two countries were established on 12 May 1993.

== EU and NATO aspirations ==
North Macedonia and Bosnia and Herzegovina share the common goal of accession to the European Union.

North Macedonia is a European Union candidate country since 2005 and awaits a date for the start of accession negotiations. It also met the criteria for joining NATO and became a member on March 27 2020.

Bosnia-Herzegovina has the goal of joining NATO as well. In 2008, it signed the Stabilisation and Association Agreement with the European Union.

== Diplomatic representations ==
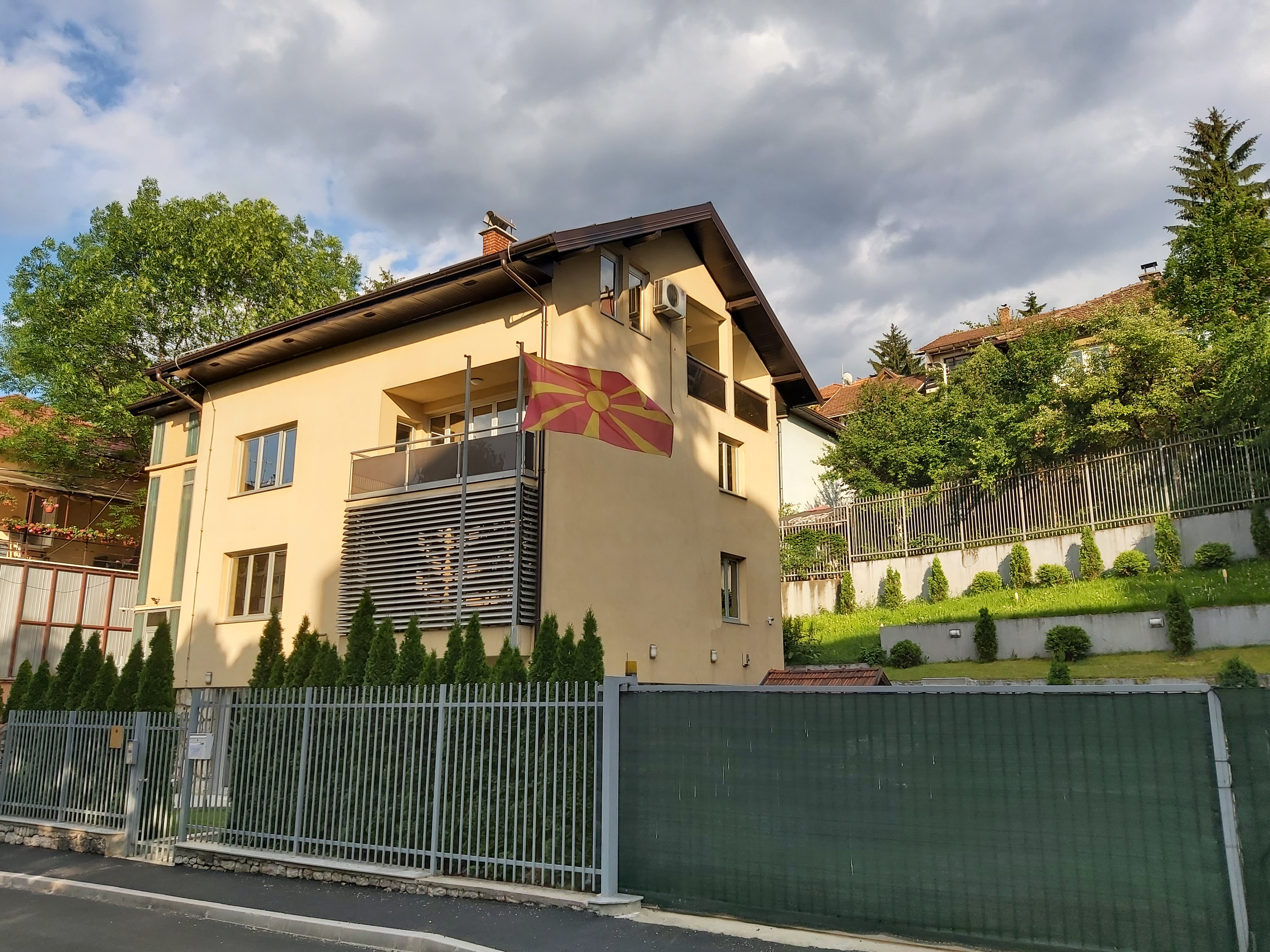
Embassy of North Macedonia in Sarajevo

- Bosnia and Herzegovina has an embassy in Skopje.
- North Macedonia has an embassy in Sarajevo.

== See also ==
- Foreign relations of Bosnia and Herzegovina
- Foreign relations of North Macedonia
- Bosnia and Herzegovina–NATO relations
- Accession of Bosnia and Herzegovina to the EU
- Accession of North Macedonia to the EU
- Croatia–North Macedonia relations
- Agreement on Succession Issues of the Former Socialist Federal Republic of Yugoslavia
- Bosniaks in North Macedonia
- Macedonians in Bosnia and Herzegovina
