= Mustafino, Sveti Nikole =

Mustafino Мустафино
- Village
- Location within North Macedonia
- Coordinates: 41.839329°N 22.075451°E
- Country: North Macedonia
- Region: Vardar
- Municipality: Sveti Nikole

Population (2002)
  - Total: 517
- Time zone: UTC+1 (CET)
  - Summer (DST): UTC+2 (CEST)
- Website: .

Mustafino (Macedonian: Мустафино) is a village in the municipality of Sveti Nikole, North Macedonia.

== Demographics ==
According to the 2002 census, the village had a total of 517 inhabitants. Ethnic groups in the village include:

- Macedonians 475
- Aromanians 42
