= Mustafino, Aurgazinsky District, Republic of Bashkortostan =

Mustafino Мустафино
- Village
- Location within Bashkortostan Location within Russia
- Coordinates: 54°04′N 56°06′E
- Country: Russia
- Region: Bashkortostan
- District: Aurgazinsky District
- Time zone: UTC+5:00

Mustafino (Russian: Мустафино; Bashkir: Мостафа, Mostafa) is a rural locality (a village) in Batyrovsky Selsoviet, Aurgazinsky District, Bashkortostan, Russia. The population was 432 as of 2010. There are 9 streets.

== Geography ==
Mustafino is located 19 km northeast of Tolbazy (the district's administrative centre) by road. Novomustafino is the nearest rural locality.
