= Mustafino, Tuymazinsky District, Republic of Bashkortostan =

Mustafino Мустафино
- Village
- Location within Bashkortostan Location within Russia
- Coordinates: 54°28′N 53°57′E
- Country: Russia
- Region: Bashkortostan
- District: Tuymazinsky District
- Time zone: UTC+5:00

Mustafino (Russian: Мустафино; Bashkir: Мостафа, Mostafa) is a rural locality (a village) in Nikolayevsky Selsoviet, Tuymazinsky District, Bashkortostan, Russia. The population was 73 as of 2010. There is 1 street.

== Geography ==
Mustafino is located 26 km southeast of Tuymazy (the district's administrative centre) by road. Nikolayevka is the nearest rural locality.
