= Mustafino, Bakalinsky District, Republic of Bashkortostan =

Mustafino Мустафино
- Selo
- Location within Bashkortostan Location within Russia
- Coordinates: 55°01′N 53°36′E
- Country: Russia
- Region: Bashkortostan
- District: Bakalinsky District
- Time zone: UTC+5:00

Mustafino (Russian: Мустафино; Bashkir: Мостафа, Mostafa) is a rural locality (a selo) and the administrative centre of Mustafinsky Selsoviet, Bakalinsky District, Bashkortostan, Russia. The population was 821 as of 2010. There are 8 streets.

== Geography ==
Mustafino is located 23 km southwest of Bakaly (the district's administrative centre) by road. Palchikovo is the nearest rural locality.
