= Mustafino, Sterlibashevsky District, Republic of Bashkortostan =

Mustafino Мустафино
- Village
- Location within Bashkortostan Location within Russia
- Coordinates: 53°14′N 55°33′E
- Country: Russia
- Region: Bashkortostan
- District: Sterlibashevsky District
- Time zone: UTC+5:00

Mustafino (Russian: Мустафино; Bashkir: Мостафа, Mostafa) is a rural locality (a village) in Allaguvatsky Selsoviet, Sterlibashevsky District, Bashkortostan, Russia. The population was 184 in 2010. There are three streets.

== Geography ==
Mustafino is located 33 km southeast of Sterlibashevo (the district's administrative centre) by road. Nordovka is the nearest rural locality.
