= Sveti Nikole Municipality =

Municipality of North Macedonia

Coordinates: 41.91°N 21.94°E

Municipality of Sveti Nikole Општина Свети Николе
- Urban municipality
- Flag

- Country: North Macedonia
- Region: Vardar
- Municipal seat: Sveti Nikole

Government
  - Mayor: Dejan Vladev (VMRO-DPMNE)

Area
  - Total: 482.89 km^{2} (186.44 sq mi)

Population
  - Total: 15,320
  - Density: 38.3/km^{2} (99/sq mi)
- Time zone: UTC+1 (CET)
- Postal code: 2220
- Area code: 032
- Vehicle registration: SN
- Website: Official

Sveti Nikole (Macedonian: Свети Николе [ˌsfɛːti ˈnikɔlɛ]) is a municipality in eastern Macedonia. Sveti Nikole is also the name of the town where the municipal seat is found. Sveti Nikole Municipality is part of the Vardar Statistical Region.

== Geography ==
The municipality borders Kumanovo Municipality and Kratovo Municipality to the north, Probištip Municipality to the east, Štip Municipality and Lozovo Municipality to the south, Veles Municipality and Petrovec Municipality to the west.

== Demographics ==
Sveti Nikole Municipality has 18,497 residents, according to the 2002 Macedonian census. According to the 2021 North Macedonia census, this municipality has 15,320 inhabitants. Ethnic groups in the municipality:

	2002		2021	
	Number	%	Number	%
TOTAL	18,497	100	15,320	100
Macedonians	18,005	97.34	14,170	92.49
Vlachs	238	1.29	134	0.87
Turks	81	0.44	57	0.37
Roma	72	0.39	45	0.29
Serbs	71	0.38	33	0.22
Albanians			10	0.07
Bosniaks	1	0.01	1	0.01
Other / Undeclared / Unknown	29	0.15	53	0.35
Persons for whom data are taken from administrative sources			817	5.33

Demographics of Sveti Nikole Municipality
Census year	Population
1994	18,528
2002	18,497
2021	15,320

== Inhabited places ==
Inhabited places in Sveti Nikole Municipality
villages: Blizanci (Алакинце) | Amzambegovo (Амзабегово) | Arbasanci (Арбасанци) | Bogoslovec (Богословец) | Burilovci (Буриловци) | Gorno Gjugjance (Горно Ѓуѓанце) | Gorno Crnilište (Горно Црнилиште) | Gorobinci (Горобинци) | Delisinci (Делисинци) | Dolno Gjugjance (Долно Ѓуѓанце) | Dolno Crnilište (Долно Црнилиште) | Erdželija (Ерџелија) | Kadrifakovo (Кадрифаково) | Knežje (Кнежје) | Krušica (Крушица) | Makreš (Макреш) | Malino (Малино) | Mezdra (Мездра) | Mečkuevci (Мечкуевци) | Mustafino (Мустафино) | Nemanjica (Немањица) | Orel (Орел) | Pavlešenci (Павлешенци) | Patetino (Патетино) | Peširovo (Пеширово) | Preod (Преод) | Rančinci (Ранчинци), Sopot (Сопот) | Stanulovci (Стануловци) | Stanjevci (Стањевци) |Stroimanci (Строиманци) | Trstenik (Трстеник) | Town(s): Sveti Nikole (Свети Никлоле)
