= Bosniaks in North Macedonia =

Bosniaks in North Macedonia Бошњаците во Северна Македонија Bošnjaci u Sjevernoj Makedoniji
- Ethnic flag of Bosniaks in North Macedonia

Total population
- 17,018 (2002)

Regions with significant populations
- Skopje: 7,585
- Veles Municipality: 2,406
- Dolneni Municipality: 2,380
- Studeničani Municipality: 1,662
- Petrovec Municipality: 1,442

Languages
- Bosnian, Macedonian

Religion
- Sunni Islam

Related ethnic groups
- Bosniaks in Kosovo

Report of the engagement of the Turkish authorities in Skopje over the settlers from Bosnia and Herzegovina: The Muhadžhir-Ottoman Club and a temporary school were created. The report recommends the Serbian government to try to acquire the settlers to the Serbian side, by opening a pub, a barber shop and a reading room. (Skopje, February 6, 1910)

The Bosniaks in North Macedonia (Macedonian: Бошњаци, Bosnian: Bošnjaci / Бошњаци) number 17,018 people according to the 2002 census. The population is largely concentrated in and around the capital Skopje, but also in the municipalities of Veles and Dolneni.

== Culture ==
=== Religion ===
Bosniaks started settling in North Macedonia after the Congress of Berlin in 1878. Bosniaks in the Republic of North Macedonia are predominantly adherents to Sunni Islam.

== History ==
In 1952, Yugoslavia and Turkey signed a free emigration agreement that allowed for Muslims in Yugoslavia to migrate to Turkey. Some of these individuals from more northern portions of Yugoslavia did not migrate and instead settled in North Macedonia, including 5,276 Bosniaks from Sandžak.

The historical censuses in Yugoslavia recorded "Muslims" (Muslimani), the so-called ethnic Muslims, in the SR Macedonia at the numbers of: 1,248 (0.1%) in 1971; 39,512 (2.1%) in 1981; 35,256 (1.7%) in 1991.

== Notable individuals ==
- Adis Jahović, member of the North Macedonia national football team
- Ferid Muhić, academic
- Cedi Osman, basketball player
- Elvira Rahić, singer

== See also ==
- Bosnia and Herzegovina–North Macedonia relations
- Macedonian Muslims
- Gorani people
- Macedonians in Bosnia and Herzegovina
