= Gradsko Municipality =

Municipality in North Macedonia

Coordinates: 41.5667°N 21.9333°E

Gradsko Municipality Општина Градско
- Rural municipality
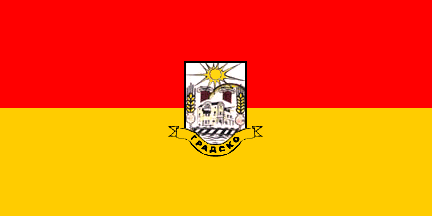
- Flag

- Country: North Macedonia
- Region: Vardar
- Municipal seat: Gradsko

Government
  - Mayor: Kiro Nackov (VMRO-DPMNE)

Area
  - Total: 236.19 km^{2} (91.19 sq mi)

Population
  - Total: 3,233
  - Density: 15.92/km^{2} (41.2/sq mi)
- Time zone: UTC+1 (CET)
- Postal code: 1420
- Area code: 043
- Vehicle registration: VE
- Website: http://www.Gradsko.gov.mk

Gradsko (Macedonian: Градско, [ˈɡrat͡sːkɔ] ) is a municipality in the eastern part of North Macedonia. Gradsko is also the name of the village where the municipal seat is found. Gradsko Municipality is part of the Vardar Statistical Region.

== Geography ==
The municipality borders

- Veles Municipality and Lozovo Municipality to the north,
- Štip Municipality to the east,
- Čaška Municipality to the west, and
- Rosoman Municipality to the south.

== Demographics ==
The municipality has 3,233 inhabitants, according to the 2021 North Macedonia census. Ethnic groups in the municipality:

	2002		2021	
	Number	%	Number	%
TOTAL	3,760	100	3,233	100
Macedonians	2,924	77.77	2,340	72.38
Bosniaks	465	12.38	349	10.79
Roma	127	3.38	183	5.66
Albanians	125	3.32	92	2.85
Turks	71	1.89	79	2.44
Serbs	23	0.61	13	0.4
Other / Undeclared / Unknown	25	0.65	44	1.37
Persons for whom data are taken from administrative sources			133	4.11
