= Vardar Statistical Region =

Coordinates: 41°26′30″N 22°02′44″E

Vardar Statistical Region Вардарски Регион (Macedonian)
- Statistical region
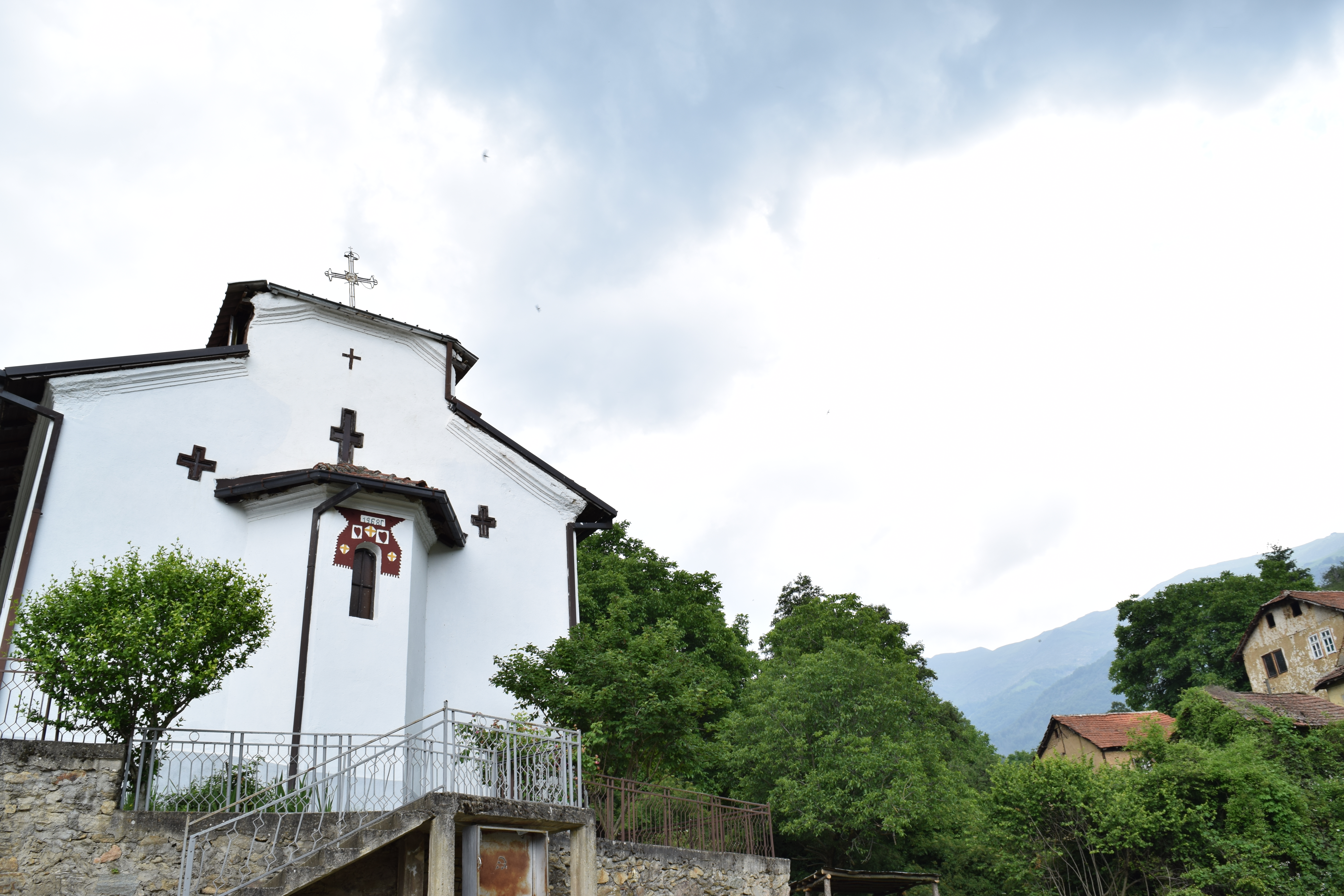
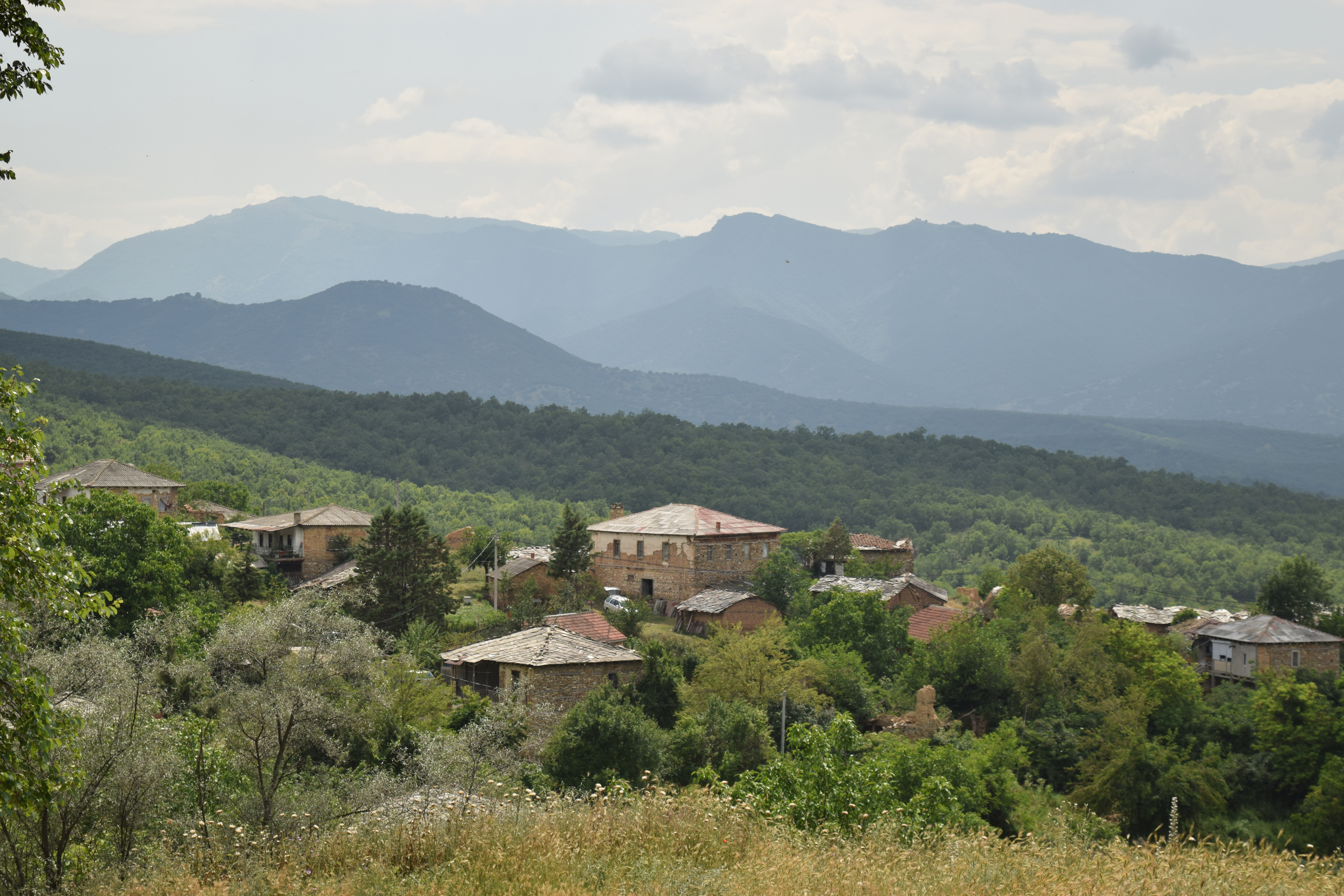
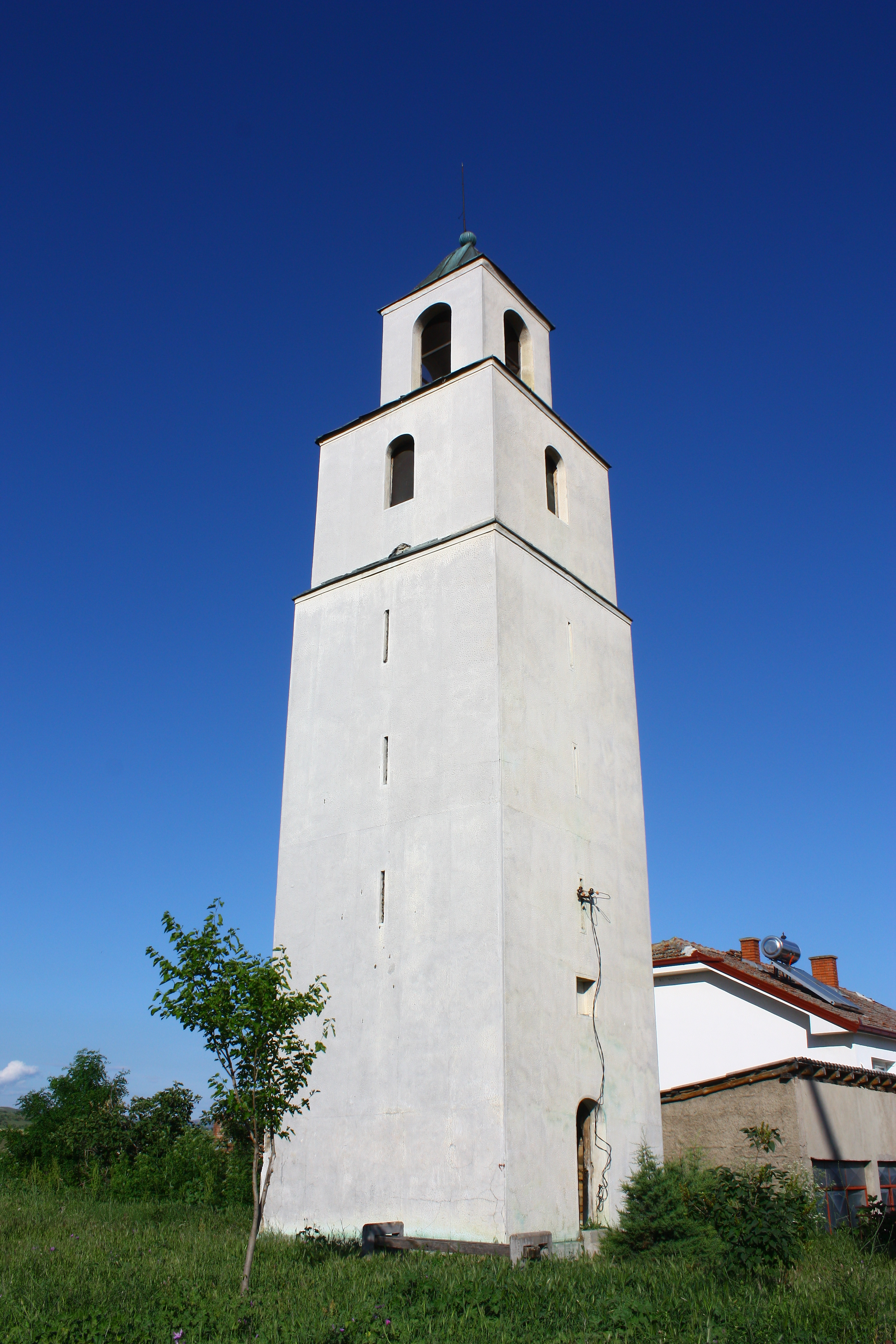
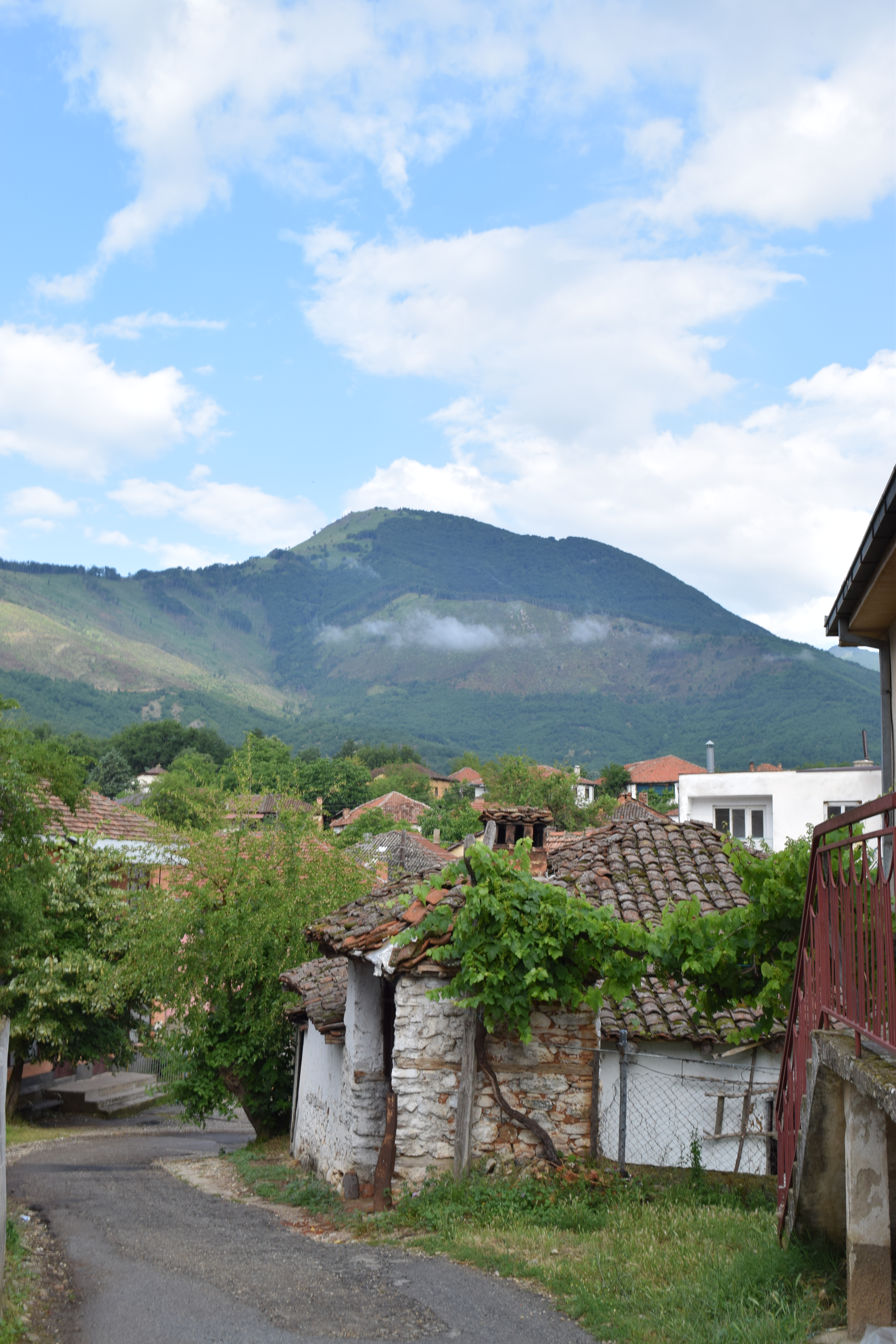
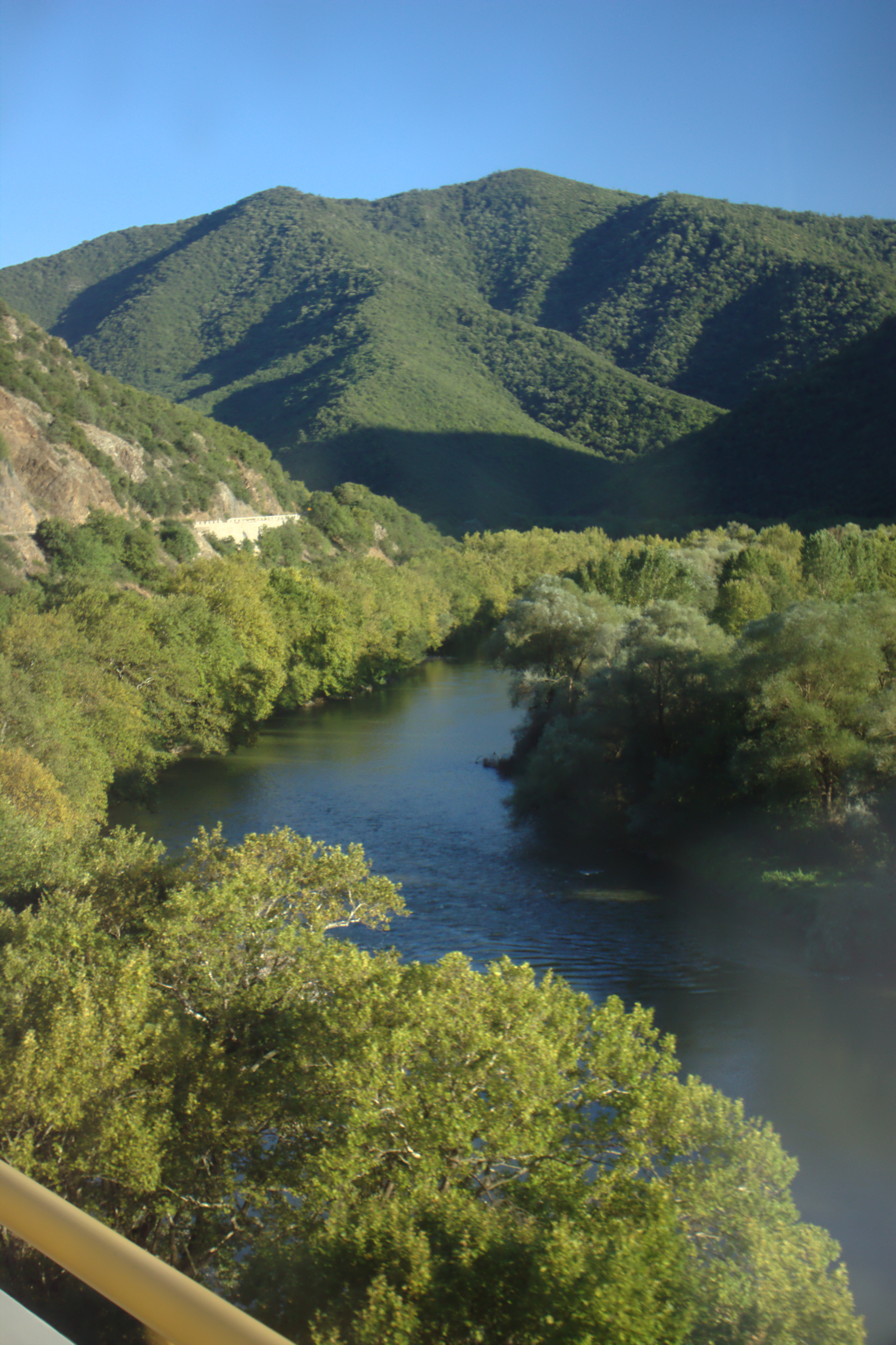
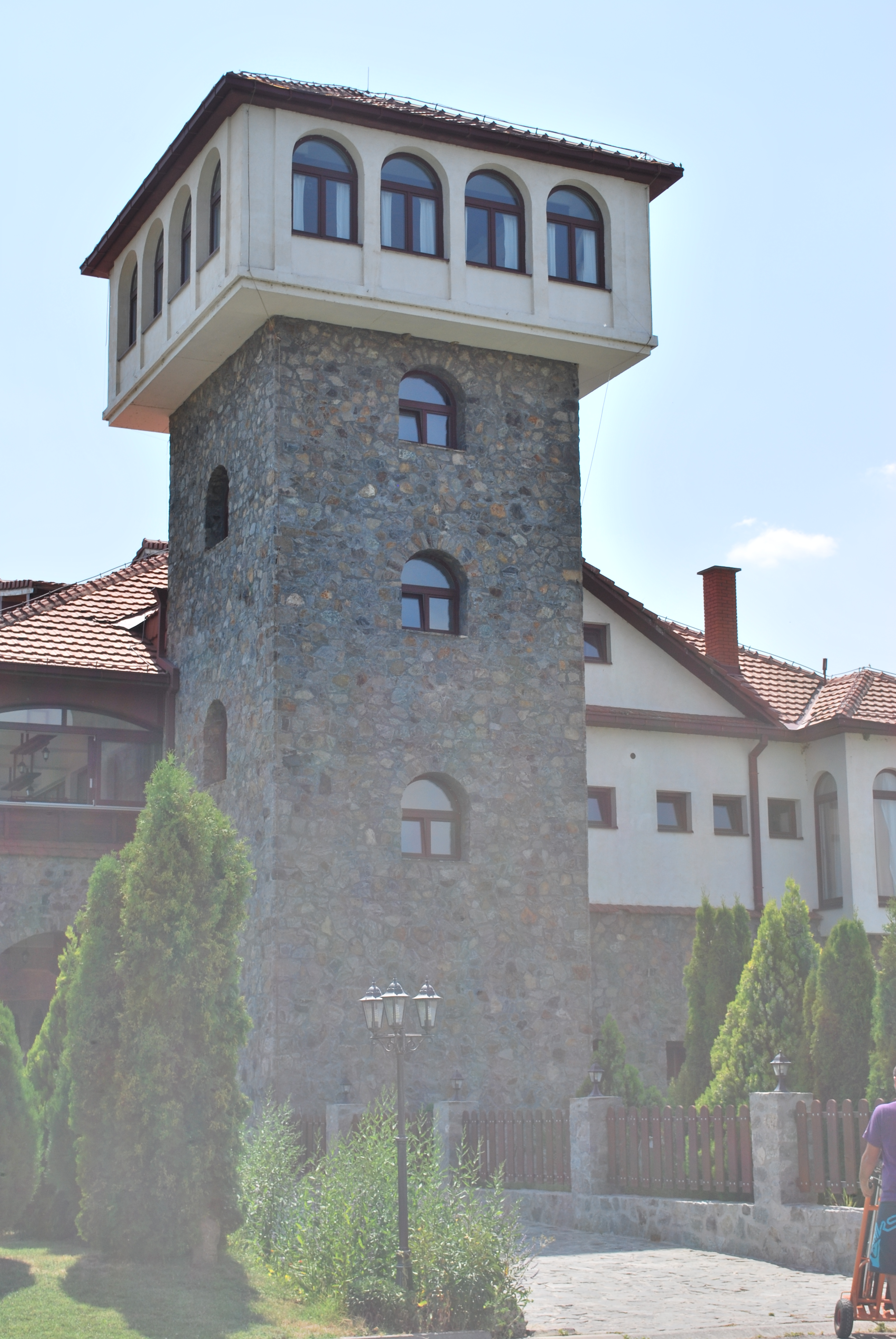
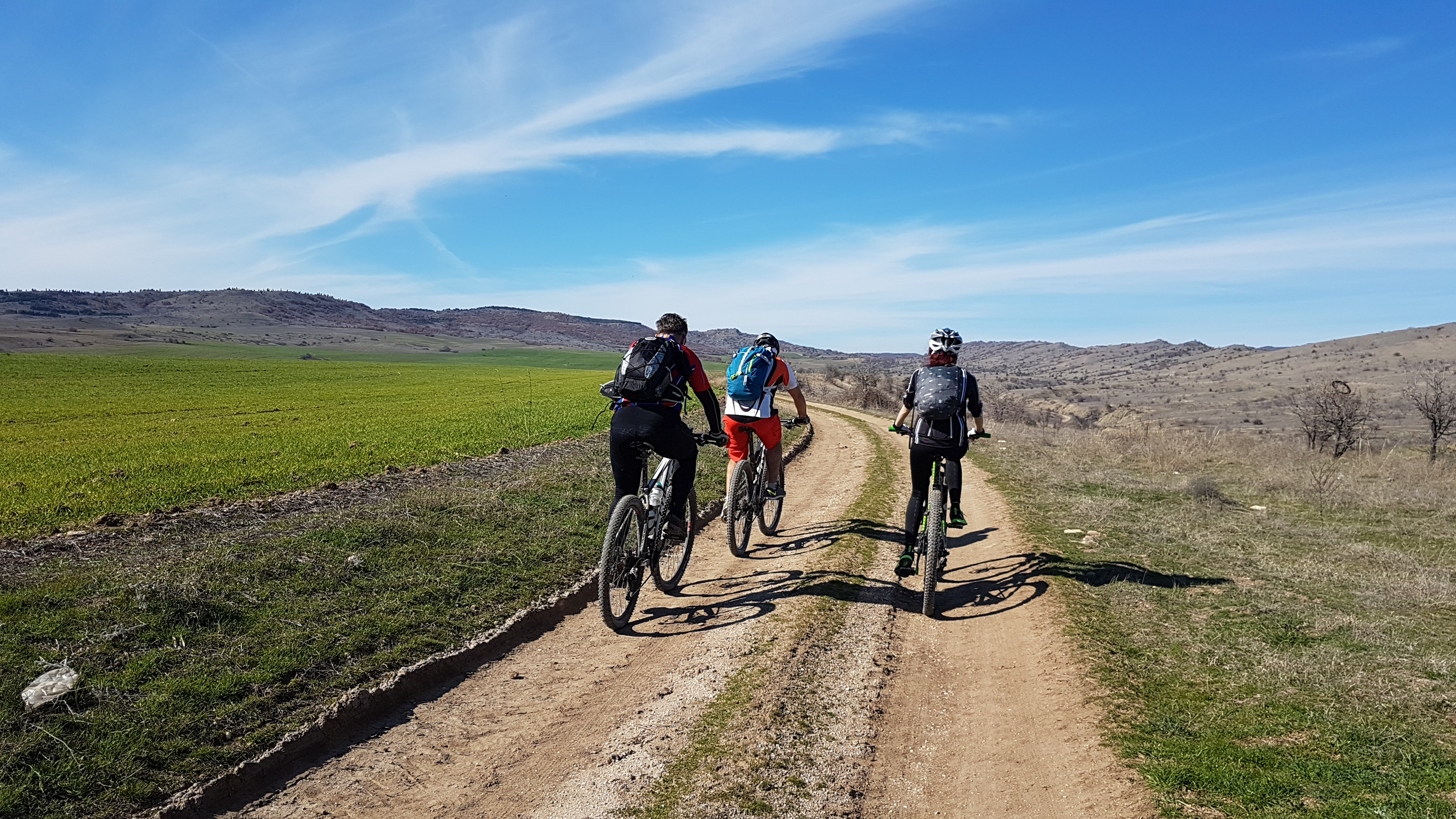
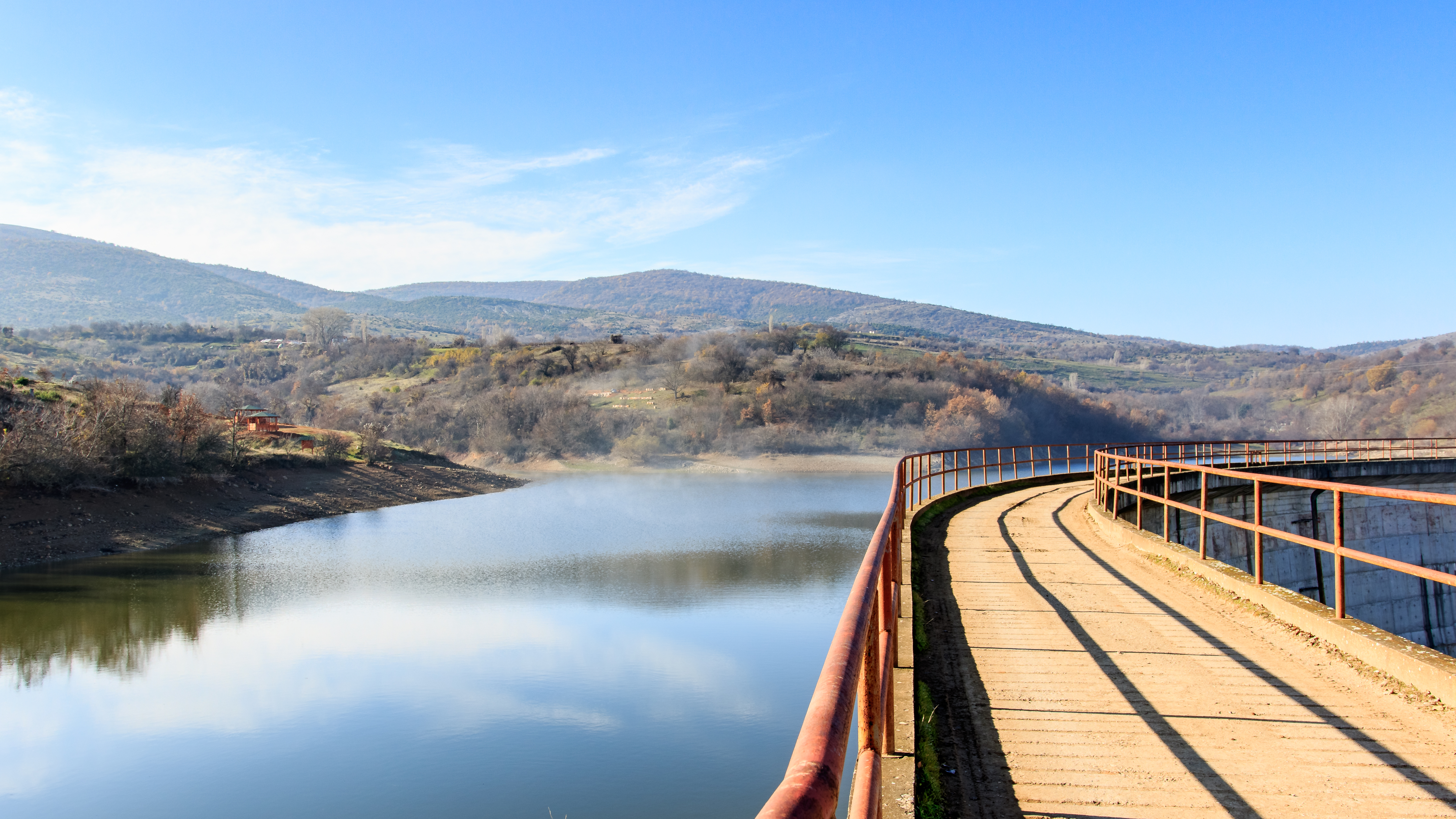
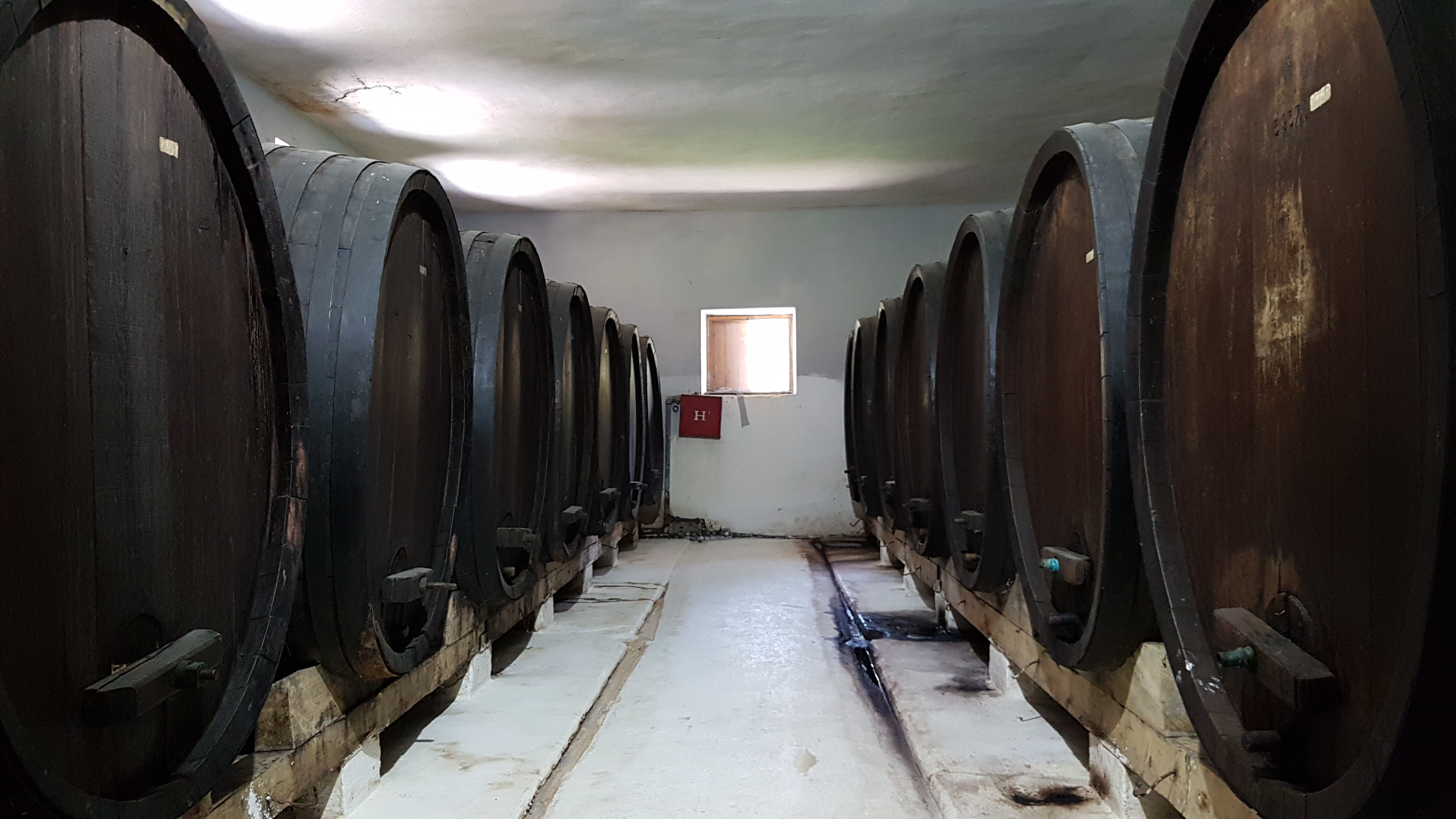
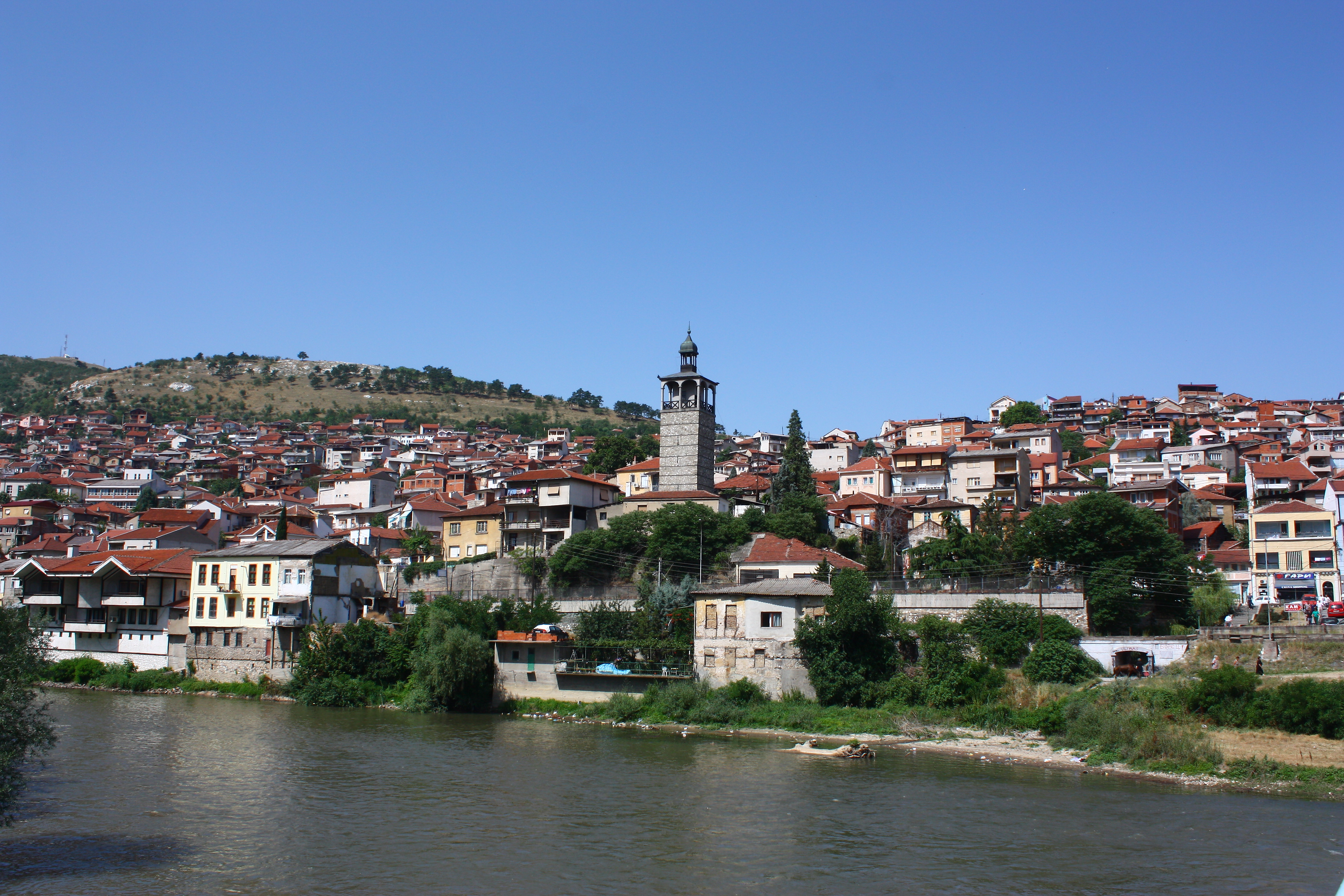
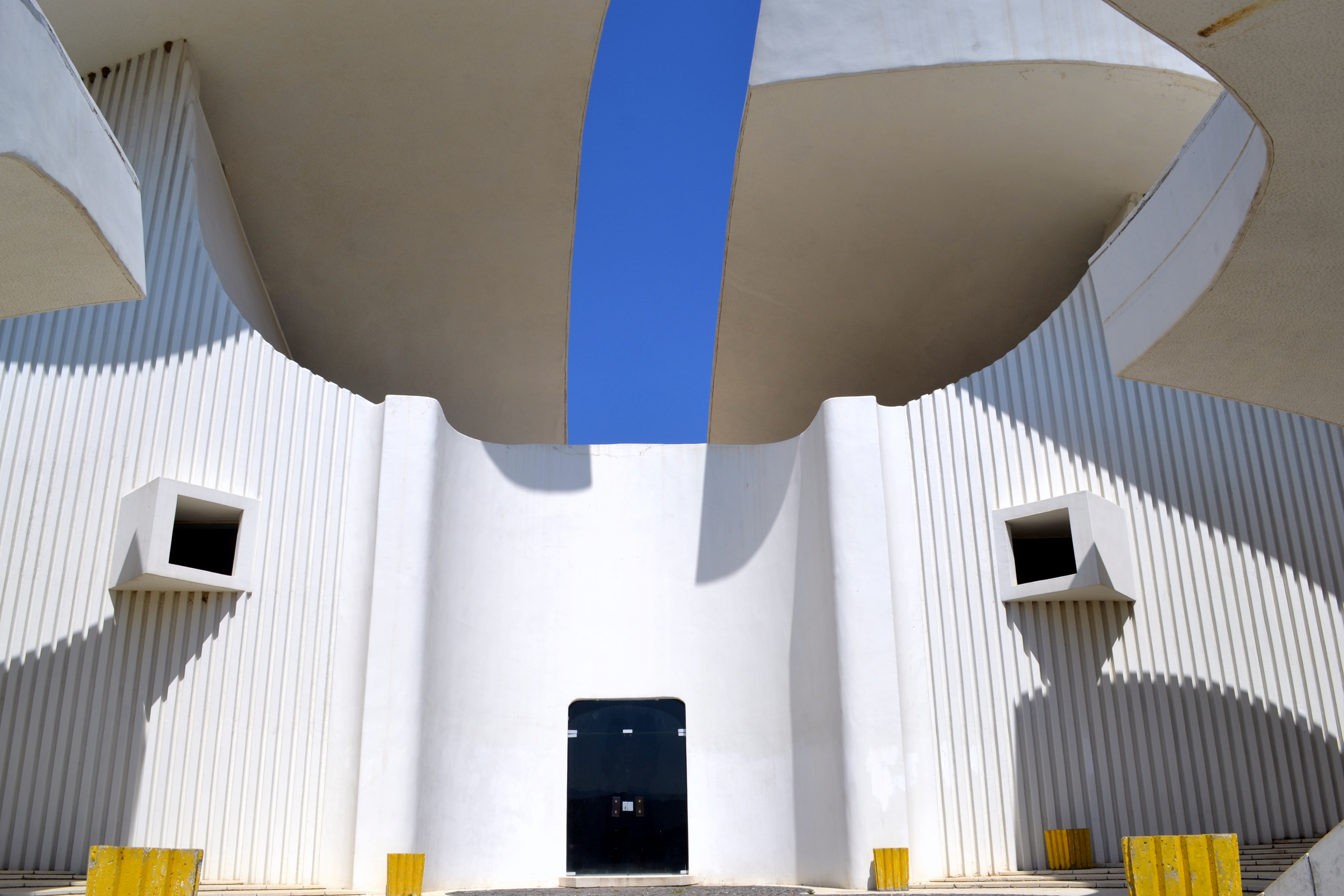
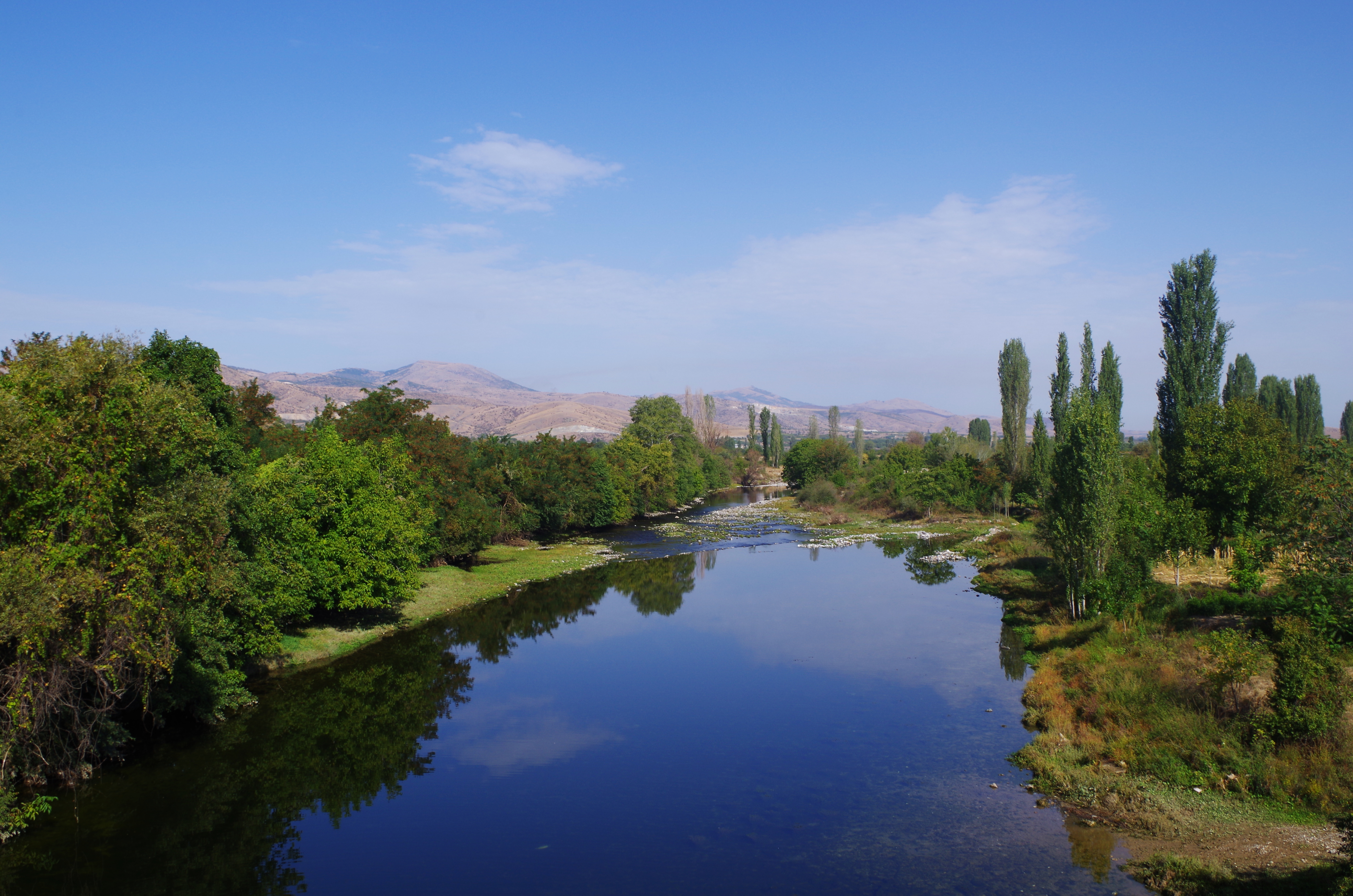
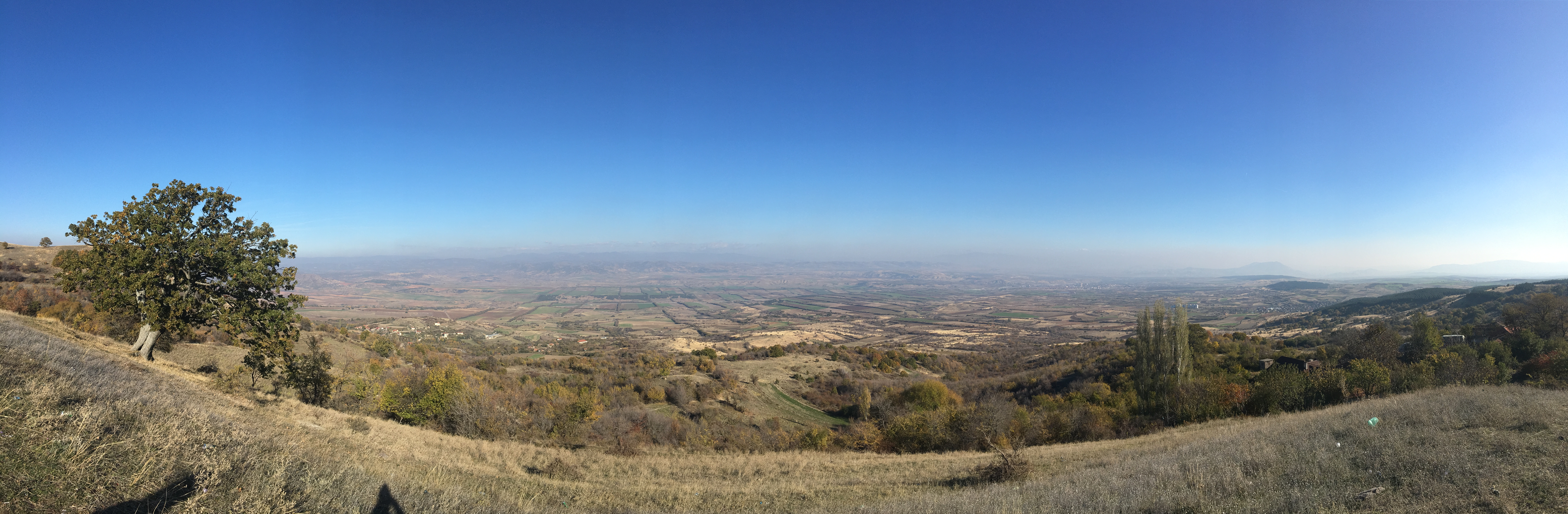

- Seal

- Country: North Macedonia

Area
  - Total: 3,995 km^{2} (1,542 sq mi)

Population (2021)
  - Total: 138,722
  - Density: 34.72/km^{2} (89.93/sq mi)
- HDI (2017): 0.759 high · 3rd of 8
- Website: vardarregion.gov.mk

The Vardar Statistical Region (Macedonian: Вардарски Регион, romanized: Vardarski Region) is one of eight statistical regions of North Macedonia. Vardar, located in the central part of North Macedonia, borders Greece to the south. Internally, it borders the Pelagonia, Southwestern, Skopje, Southeastern, and Eastern. The Vardar Statistical Region is named after the Vardar River, which runs through the region.

== Municipalities ==
The municipalities of the region

Vardar statistical region is divided into 9 municipalities:

- Čaška
- Demir Kapija
- Gradsko
- Kavadarci
- Lozovo
- Negotino
- Rosoman
- Sveti Nikole
- Veles

== Geography ==
The Vardar Statistical Region is bisected by the Vardar River and is bounded to the south by Greece. The region is flatter than most of the rest of the country.

== Demographics ==
Map of the largest ethnic groups in the region

=== Population ===
The current population of the Vardar Statistical Region is 154,535 citizens, according to the last population census in 2002, making it the least populous of the eight statistical regions.

Census year	Population	Change
1994	130,793	N/A
2002	154,535	+18.2%
2021	138,722	-10.4%

=== Ethnicities ===
The largest ethnic group in the region are the Macedonians.

	2002		2021	
	Number	%	Number	%
TOTAL	154,535	100	138,722	100
Macedonians	137,520	88.99	112,444	81.06
Albanians	5,127	3.38	6,981	5.03
Turks	3,178	2.06	2,608	1.88
Bosniaks	2,979	1.93	2,238	1.61
Roma	2,153	1.39	2,029	1.46
Serbs	2,102	1.36	1,209	0.87
Vlachs	745	0.48	496	0.38
Others / Undeclared / Unknown	641	0.41	1,027	0.72
Persons for whom data are taken from administrative sources			9,690	6.99

== See also ==
- Vardar
