= List of cities in North Macedonia =

Map of the cities in North Macedonia.

This is a list of cities and towns in North Macedonia. There are 34 cities and towns in North Macedonia. In Macedonian, every city or town, regardless of size, is called grad (град, pl. gradovi, градови), but a smaller one can also be called gratče (гратче, pl. гратчиња, gratčinja), a diminutive of grad. Only five cities in the country have a population of more than 50,000 inhabitants. The capital, Skopje, and its metropolitan area are home to about 33% of the country's total population. The 2002 census showed that the majority of the population, 59.5%, lived in urban areas.

The five largest cities in North Macedonia, each with a population of over 50,000 inhabitants, are: Skopje (526,502), Kumanovo (75,051), Bitola (69,287), Prilep (63,308) and Tetovo (63,176).

Fifteen cities in the country have a population between 10,000 and 50,000 inhabitants: Štip (42,000), Veles (40,664), Ohrid (38,818), Strumica (33,825), Gostivar (32,814), Kavadarci (32,038), Kočani (24,632), Kičevo (23,428), Gevgelija (15,156), Struga (15,009), Radoviš (14,460), Kriva Palanka (13,481), Negotino (12,488), Debar (11,735) and Sveti Nikole (11,728).

Fourteen cities have a population of less than 10,000 inhabitants: Probištip (9,760), Delčevo (9,644), Vinica (8,584), Resen (7,904), Berovo (5,850), Kratovo (5,401), Bogdanci (5,244), Makedonska Kamenica (4,368), Kruševo (4,104), Valandovo (3,671), Makedonski Brod (3,643), Demir Kapija (2,643), Pehčevo (2,471) and Demir Hisar (2,431).

== Statistics ==
=== Largest cities ===
The five largest cities in North Macedonia are:

no.	city	municipality	population
1	Skopje	Greater Skopje	526,502
2	Kumanovo	Kumanovo	75,051
3	Bitola	Bitola	69,287
4	Prilep	Prilep	63,308
5	Tetovo	Tetovo	63,176

=== Smallest towns ===
The five smallest towns in North Macedonia are:

no.	city	municipality	population
1	Demir Hisar	Demir Hisar	2,431
2	Pehčevo	Pehčevo	2,471
3	Demir Kapija	Demir Kapija	2,643
4	Makedonski Brod	Makedonski Brod	3,643
5	Valandovo	Valandovo	3,671

=== Demographics ===
The population and ethnic groups statistics are taken from the 2021 census, meanwhile the language and religion statistics are taken from the 2002 census.

city	municipality	population	dominant ethnic group(s)	% of the dominant ethnic group(s)	dominant language(s)	% of the dominant language(s)	dominant religion	% of the dominant religion(s)
Berovo	Berovo	5,850	Macedonians (5,198)	88.9	Macedonian (6.816)	97.3	Orthodox (6.331)	90.4
Bitola	Bitola	69,287	Macedonians (55,995)	80.8	Macedonian (69,255)	92.8	Orthodox (66,492)	89.1
Bogdanci	Bogdanci	5,244	Macedonians (4,909)	93.6	Macedonian (5,813)	96.7	Orthodox (5,752)	95.6
Debar	Debar	11,735	Albanians (8,194)	69.8	Albanian (11,510)	79	Islam (13,763)	94.5
Delčevo	Delčevo	9,644	Macedonians (8,526)	88.4	Macedonian (10,851)	94.3	Orthodox (10,594)	92.1
Demir Kapija	Demir Kapija	2,643	Macedonians (2,530)	95.7	Macedonian (3,191)	97.4	Orthodox (3,210)	98
Demir Hisar	Demir Hisar	2,431	Macedonians (2,281)	93.8	Macedonian (2,483)	95.7	Orthodox (2,486)	95.8
Gevgelija	Gevgelija	15,156	Macedonians (13,621)	89.9	Macedonian (15,238)	97.1	Orthodox (15,273)	97.3
Gostivar	Gostivar	32,814	Albanians (13,585); Macedonians (10,305)	41.4; 31.4	Albanian (16,877); Macedonian (13,843)	47; 38.6	Islam (23,686); Orthodox (11,865)	66; 33
Kavadarci	Kavadarci	32,038	Macedonians (28,815)	89.9	Macedonian (28,847)	98.8	Orthodox (28,210)	96.6
Kičevo	Kičevo	23,428	Macedonians (12,687); Albanians (5,110)	54.2; 21.8	Macedonian (16.931); Albanian (7,635)	62.5; 28.2	Orthodox (15,139); Islam (11,759)	55.9; 43.4
Kočani	Kočani	24,632	Macedonians (20,229)	82.1	Macedonian (25,832)	91.1	Orthodox (25,448)	89.8
Kratovo	Kratovo	5,401	Macedonians (5,011)	92.8	Macedonian (6,709)	96.8	Orthodox (6,696)	96.7
Kriva Palanka	Kriva Palanka	13,481	Macedonians (12,405)	92	Macedonian (13,776)	94.6	Orthodox (13,785)	94.6
Kruševo	Kruševo	4,104	Macedonians (3,053); Aromanians (866)	74.4; 21.1	Macedonian (4,562)	85.5	Orthodox (5,275)	98.9
Kumanovo	Kumanovo	75,051	Macedonians (43,280); Albanians (17,685)	57.7; 23.6	Macedonian (45.306); Albanian (18,283)	63.9; 25.8	Orthodox (46,766); Islam (22,483)	66; 31.7
Makedonski Brod	Makedonski Brod	3,643	Macedonians (3,511)	96.4	Macedonian (3,730)	99.7	Orthodox (3,731)	99.7
Makedonska Kamenica	Makedonska Kamenica	4,368	Macedonians (4,120)	94.3	Macedonian (5,106)	99.2	Orthodox (4,734)	91.9
Negotino	Negotino	12,488	Macedonians (11,476)	91.9	Macedonian (13,111)	98.6	Orthodox (12,900)	97.1
Ohrid	Ohrid	38,818	Macedonians (28,920)	74.5	Macedonian (34,910)	83	Orthodox (33,987)	80.8
Pehčevo	Pehčevo	2,471	Macedonians (2,284)	92.4	Macedonian (3,124)	96.5	Orthodox (3,078)	95
Prilep	Prilep	63,308	Macedonians (54,028)	85.3	Macedonian (64,669)	97.6	Orthodox (60,655)	91.5
Probištip	Probištip	9,760	Macedonians (9,189)	94.1	Macedonian (8,628)	99	Orthodox (8,648)	99,2
Radoviš	Radoviš	14,460	Macedonians (10,688)	73.9	Macedonian (14,027)	86.4	Orthodox (13,912)	85.7
Resen	Resen	7,904	Macedonians (5,357)	67.8	Macedonian (6,574)	75.1	Orthodox (6,382)	72.9
Sveti Nikole	Sveti Nikole	11,728	Macedonians (10,914)	93.1	Macedonian (13,396)	97.4	Orthodox (13,463)	97.9
Skopje	Greater Skopje	526,502	Macedonians (309,107); Albanians (120,293)	58.7; 22.8	Macedonian (341.339)	73	Orthodox (343,197); Islam (109,954)	73.4; 23.7
Struga	Struga	15,009	Macedonians (6,517); Albanians (4,903)	43.4; 32.7	Macedonian (9.665); Albanian (5,615)	58.3; 33.9	Orthodox (9,197); Islam (7,075)	55.5; 42.7
Strumica	Strumica	33,825	Macedonians (26,185)	77.4	Macedonian (32,123)	90,9	Orthodox (30,238)	85.6
Štip	Štip	42,000	Macedonians (32,658)	77.8	Macedonian (38,846)	88.9	Orthodox (39,127)	89.6
Tetovo	Tetovo	63,176	Albanians (41,356); Macedonians (14,116)	65.5; 22.3	Albanian (29.363); Macedonian (18,980)	55.4; 35.8	Islam (33,509); Orthodox (18,676)	63.3; 35.2
Valandovo	Valandovo	3,671	Macedonians (3,393)	92.4	Macedonian (4,303)	97.7	Orthodox (4,064)	92.3
Veles	Veles	40,664	Macedonians (33,956)	83.5	Macedonian (40,576)	92.8	Orthodox (40,135)	91.8
Vinica	Vinica	8,584	Macedonians (6,769)	78.9	Macedonian (9,290)	85.5	Orthodox (8,989)	82.7

== Settlements by region ==
=== Eastern Region ===
Map of the Eastern Region.

city	municipality	population	coat of arms	flag	picture
Berovo	Berovo	5,850			
Delčevo	Delčevo	9,644			
Kočani	Kočani	24,632			
Makedonska Kamenica	Makedonska Kamenica	4,368			
Pehčevo	Pehčevo	2,471			
Probištip	Probištip	9,760			
Štip	Štip	42,000			
Vinica	Vinica	8,584			

=== Northeastern Region ===
Map of the Northeastern Region.

city	municipality	population	coat of arms	flag	picture
Kratovo	Kratovo	5,401			
Kriva Palanka	Kriva Palanka	13,481			
Kumanovo	Kumanovo	75,051			

=== Pelagonia Region ===
Map of Pelagonia Region.

city	municipality	population	coat of arms	flag	picture
Bitola	Bitola	69,287			
Demir Hisar	Demir Hisar	2,431			
Kruševo	Kruševo	4,104			
Prilep	Prilep	63,308			
Resen	Resen	7,904			

=== Polog Region ===
Map of Polog Region.

city	municipality	population	coat of arms	flag	picture
Gostivar	Gostivar	32,814			
Tetovo	Tetovo	63,176			

=== Skopje Region ===
Map of Skopje Region.

city	municipality	population	coat of arms	flag	picture
Skopje	Greater Skopje	526,502			

=== Southeastern Region ===
Map of the Southeastern Region.

city	municipality	population	coat of arms	flag	picture
Bogdanci	Bogdanci	5,244			
Gevgelija	Gevgelija	15,156			
Radoviš	Radoviš	14,460			
Strumica	Strumica	33,825			
Valandovo	Valandovo	3,671			

=== Southwestern Region ===
Map of the Southwestern Region.

city	municipality	population	coat of arms	flag	picture
Debar	Debar	11,735			
Kičevo	Kičevo	23,428			
Makedonski Brod	Makedonski Brod	3,643			
Ohrid	Ohrid	38,818			
Struga	Struga	15,009			

=== Vardar Region ===
Map of Vardar Region.

city	municipality	population	coat of arms	flag	picture
Demir Kapija	Demir Kapija	2,643			
Kavadarci	Kavadarci	32,038			
Negotino	Negotino	12,488			
Sveti Nikole	Sveti Nikole	11,728			
Veles	Veles	40,664			

== See also ==
- North Macedonia
- List of municipalities in North Macedonia by population
- List of twin towns and sister cities in North Macedonia
- List of cities in Europe
- Europe
