= Koprišnica Falls =

Waterfall in North Macedonia

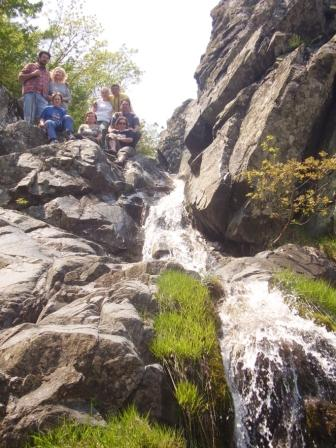
Korprisnica Falls

Koprišnica Falls is located near the uninhabited village of Koprišnica in the Municipality of Demir Kapija in North Macedonia. The waterfall is formed from the waters of the Doznica River. Additional waterfalls can also be found higher in the mountains around Demir Kapija.

== See also ==
- List of waterfalls
