= Dren =

Dren may refer to:

== People ==
- Dren (name), an Albanian given name

== Places ==
- Dren, Pernik Province, a village in Pernik Province of Bulgaria
- Dren, Leposavić, a village in Kosovo
- Dren, Zubin Potok, a village in Kosovo
- Dren, Demir Kapija, a village in North Macedonia
- Dren, Prilep, a village in North Macedonia
  - Dren (mountain), in the village
- Dren (Lazarevac), a village in Serbia
- Dren (Obrenovac), a village in Serbia
- Dren, Kostel, a settlement in Slovenia

== Other uses ==
- DREN, a United States Department of Defense computer network
- "dren", fictional profanity from the science fiction TV series Farscape, see profanity in science fiction
