= Besvica =

Besvica Бесвица
- Village
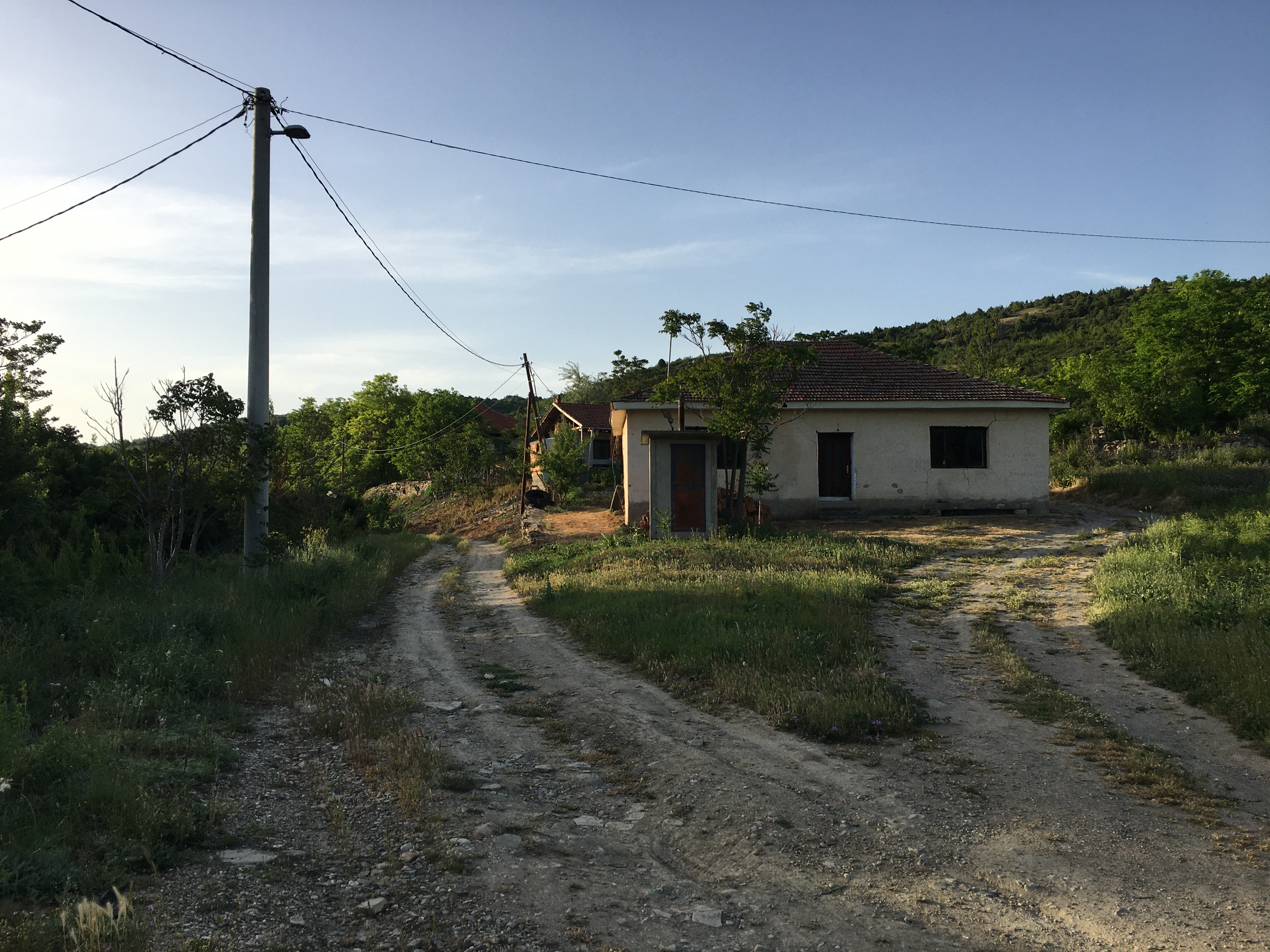
- View of the village

- Location within North Macedonia
- Coordinates: 41°23′05″N 22°10′58″E
- Country: North Macedonia
- Region: Vardar
- Municipality: Demir Kapija

Population (2002)
  - Total: 18
- Time zone: UTC+1 (CET)
  - Summer (DST): UTC+2 (CEST)
- Car plates: DK
- Climate: Cfa

Besvica (Macedonian: Бесвица) is in the southeast of North Macedonia. It is an isolated village in the southern part of the Demir Kapija Municipality. The road from the Demir Kapija church south to the village of Konopište was part of a system of roads in the days of the Turkish and improved by the French after World War I. Besvica is the first village past Demir Kapija on this road to Konopište and the Kožuf mountain. Besvica was a crossroads for many years, between Demir Kapija and its southern villages to the main road through North Macedonia, now highway 75. One of the only 2 mosques in the municipality is located here. The fountain memorial to fallen village soldiers during World War II pours clean water for drinking and use for the village inhabitants. Other villages on this road include Barovo, Krnjevo, Gorna Bošava, Dolna Bošava, and Konopište

== Demographics ==
According to the 2002 census, the village had a total of 18 inhabitants. Ethnic groups in the village include:

- Macedonians 18

== Notes ==
- Demir Kapija: From Prehistory to Today ISBN 9989-712-65-4, p 97-8
