= Iberli =

Iberli Иберли
- Village
- Location within North Macedonia
- Country: North Macedonia
- Region: Vardar
- Municipality: Demir Kapija

Population (2002)
  - Total: 0
- Time zone: UTC+1 (CET)
  - Summer (DST): UTC+2 (CEST)
- Car plates: DK
- Climate: Cfa

Iberli (Macedonian: Иберли) is an uninhabited village in North Macedonia. It is approximately 5km (3.1mi) northeast of Demir Kapija in the eastern mountain valley of the Demir Kapija Municipality. The village is along the river, which shares its name.

A few people still have houses there. Most residents now live in Čelevec or Laki, a more recent, unofficial village in the municipality

== Demographics ==
In 1992, six people lived in the village. Since 2002, the village has had a total of 0 inhabitants.

== Notes ==
Demir Kapija: From Prehistory to Today ISBN 9989-712-65-4, P 98-9

== See also ==
- Demir Kapija municipality
