= Koprišnica =

Koprišnica Копришница
- Village
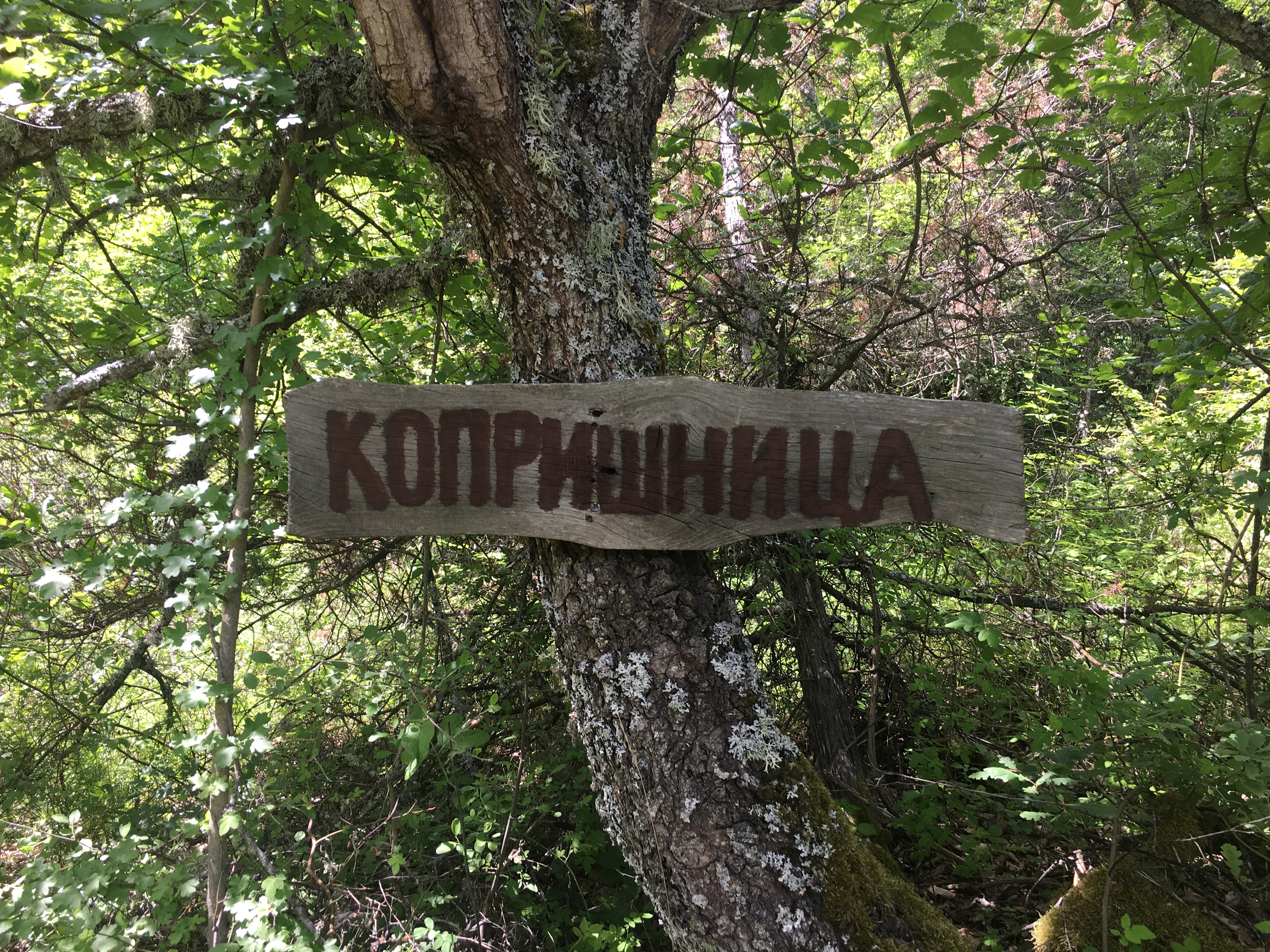

- Location within North Macedonia
- Country: North Macedonia
- Region: Vardar
- Municipality: Demir Kapija

Population (2002)
  - Total: 0
- Time zone: UTC+1 (CET)
  - Summer (DST): UTC+2 (CEST)
- Car plates: DK
- Climate: Cfa

Koprišnica (Macedonian: Копришница) is a small village south of Dren along the Došnica river in North Macedonia. It has the only waterfalls in the municipality of Demir Kapija. There are no residents in the village, but former residents and families return to open the church on the Patron Saint's Day, coined Panagjur, on May 8. It is the highest elevated village in the municipality.

== Demographics ==
According to the 2002 census, the village had a total of 0 inhabitants.

== Notes ==
- Demir Kapija: From Prehistory to Today ISBN 9989-712-65-4, p 97-8
