= Dračevica, Demir Kapija =

Dračevica Драчевица
- Village
- Location within North Macedonia
- Coordinates: 41.349972°N 22.195935°E
- Country: North Macedonia
- Region: Vardar
- Municipality: Demir Kapija
- Elevation: 700 m (2,300 ft)

Population (2002)
  - Total: 0
- Time zone: UTC+1 (CET)
  - Summer (DST): UTC+2 (CEST)
- Website: .

Dračevica (Macedonian: Драчевица) is an uninhabited village in the southern mountains of the municipality of Demir Kapija, North Macedonia. It was originally between Demir Kapija and Besvica, but after an incident with the Turks, the villagers moved into the mountain. After the village of Strmaševo was destroyed by the Bulgarian forces during World War I, many of its people also moved to Dračevica. Today, it is merely a weekend getaway for many people and some grow their grapes in this village. It is elevated at 700 m. The hike to get there is long, but the municipality operates a mountain hut in this village free of charge. They often go there, and the forestry company operates in that area for wood supply.

== Demographics ==
According to the 2002 census, the village had a total of 0 inhabitants.

== See also ==
- Demir Kapija municipality

== Notes ==
- Demir Kapija: From Prehistory to Today ISBN 9989-712-65-4, p 97-8
