= Košarka =

Košarka Кошарка
- Village
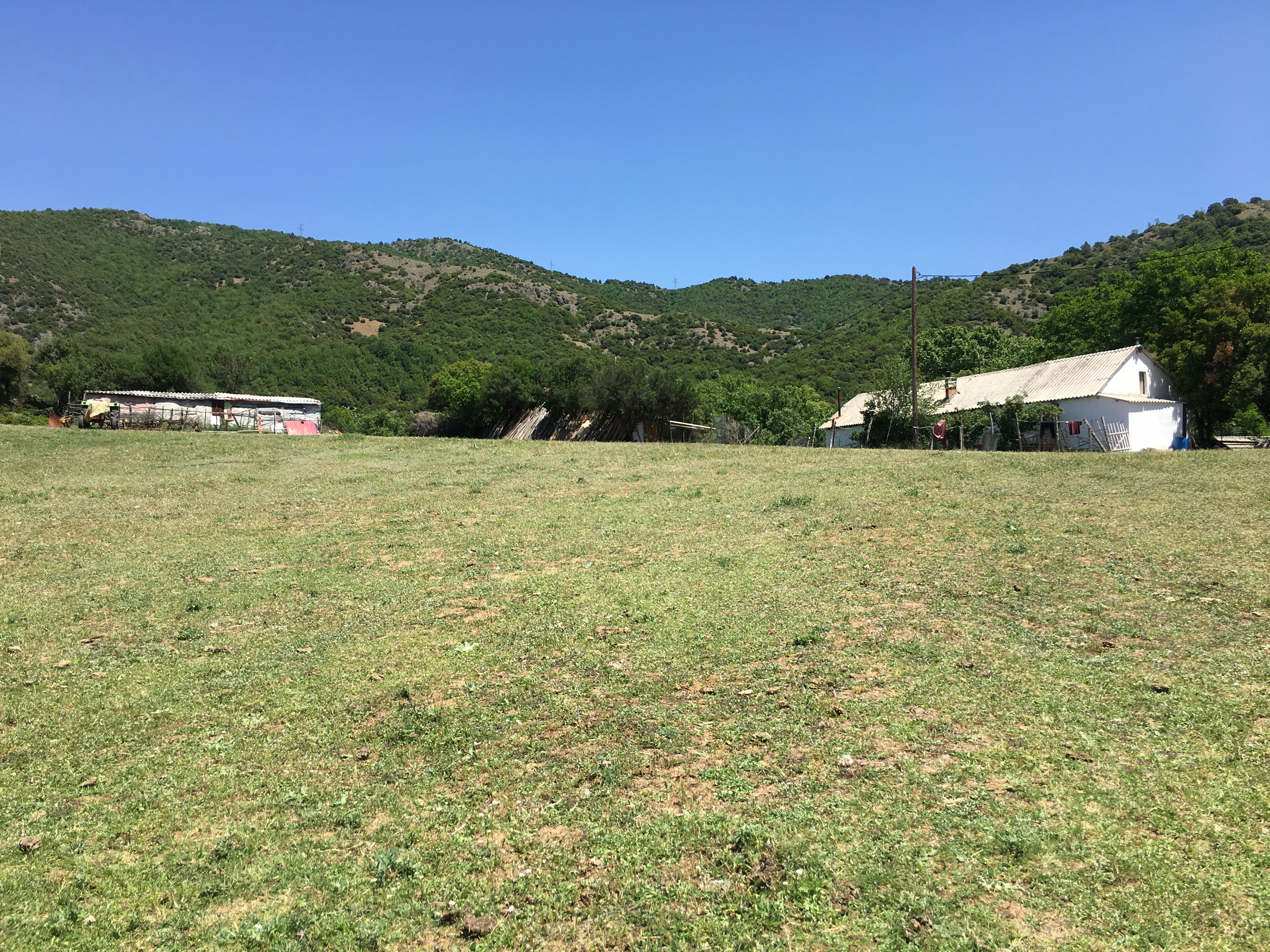
- Houses in the locality Laki

- Location within North Macedonia
- Country: North Macedonia
- Region: Vardar
- Municipality: Demir Kapija

Population (2021)
  - Total: 14
- Time zone: UTC+1 (CET)
  - Summer (DST): UTC+2 (CEST)
- Car plates: DK
- Climate: Cfa

Košarka (Macedonian: Кошарка) is an abandoned Turkish village in the mountains of the eastern mountain valley of the municipality Demir Kapija in North Macedonia. Most of its residents moved down, close to the highway to develop another village, Laki. Laki is not a registered village, yet, but electricity has been brought to the villagers. There is a fountain where the village used to be, yet, difficult to find, as the footpath has been worn, hardly ever used.

== Demographics ==
According to the statistics of Bulgarian ethnographer Vasil Kanchov from 1900, 702 inhabitants lived in Košarka, all Turks. On the 1927 ethnic map of Leonhard Schulze-Jena, the village is shown as a Turkish village. As of the 2021 census, Košarka had 14 residents with the following ethnic composition:

- Turks 14

According to the 2002 census, the village had a total of 22 inhabitants. Ethnic groups in the village include:

- Turks 22

== Notes ==
- Demir Kapija: From Prehistory to Today ISBN 9989-712-65-4, p 97-8

== See also ==
- Demir Kapija municipality

== Sources ==
- Demir Kapija: From Prehistory to Today ISBN 9989-712-65-4, p 96
