= Miravci railway station =

Railway station in Miravci, North Macedonia

Coordinates: 41.3246°N 22.4445°E

Miravci ЖС „Миравци“
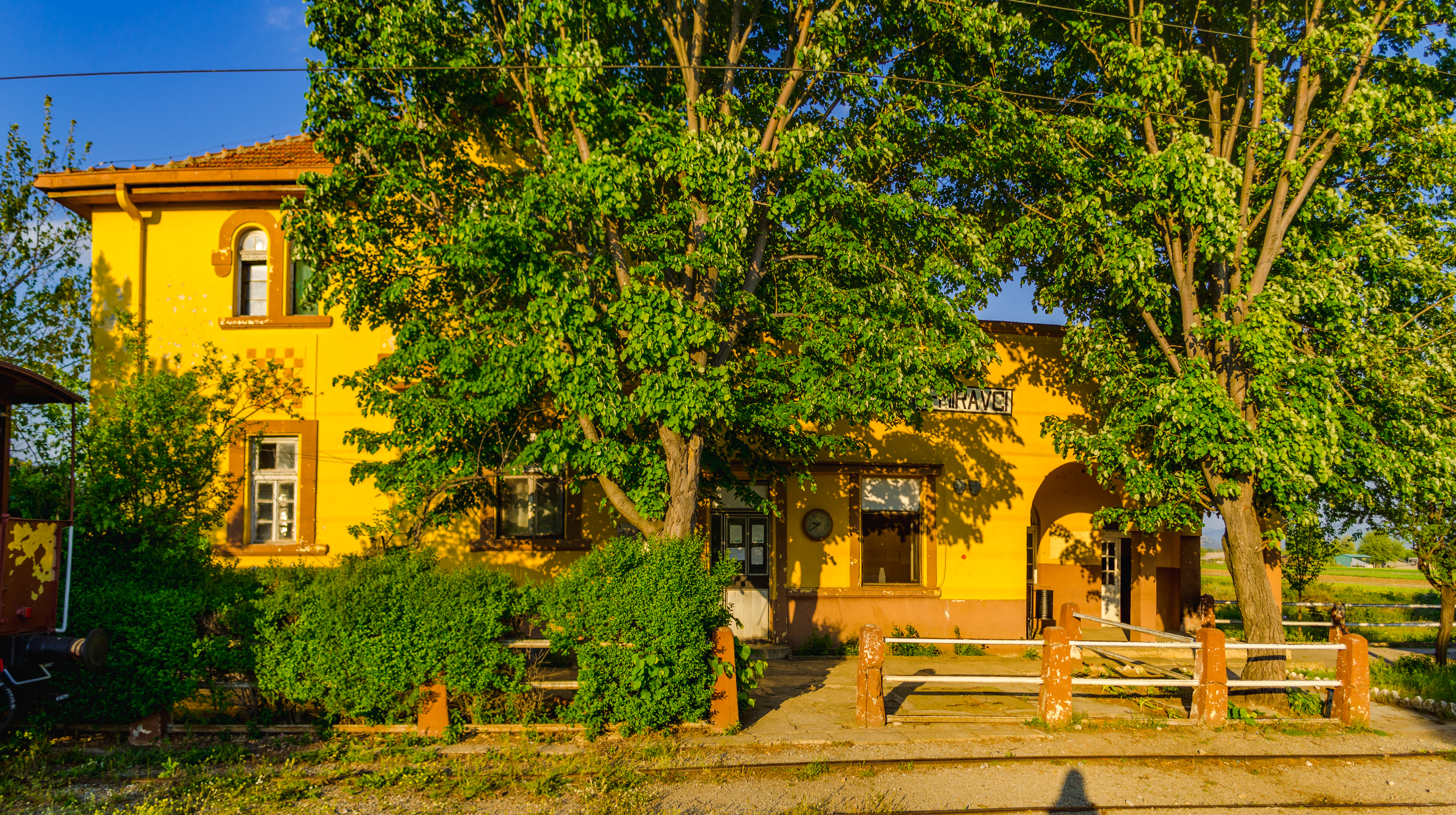
- View of the station

General information
- Location: North Macedonia
- Owner: Macedonian Railways
- Line: Skopje — Gevgelija
Location

The Miravci railway station serves the village of Miravci, North Macedonia. The two-storey station building is located outside Miravci, along the local road leading to village. Regional and domestic trains pass through the railway station on the Skopje - Gevgelija rail line.

== History ==
The railway to Miravci was built in 1872, when the village was connected to Thessaloniki. The railway was later extended (in several phases) to Skopje.

A rockfall closed the rail line between the crossroads at Klisura and the station in April 2020 for about 14 hours in total.

== Photos ==
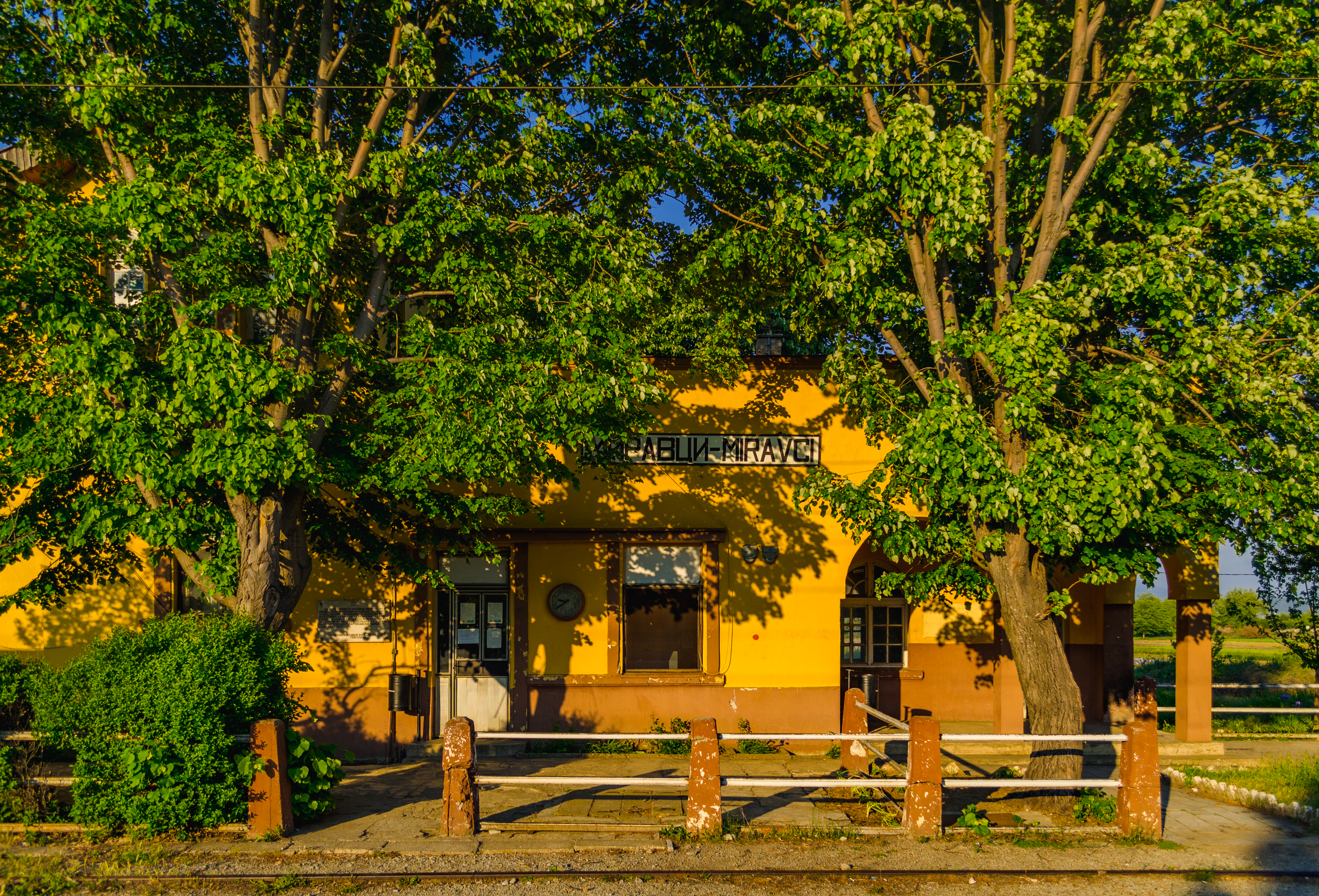
View of the station

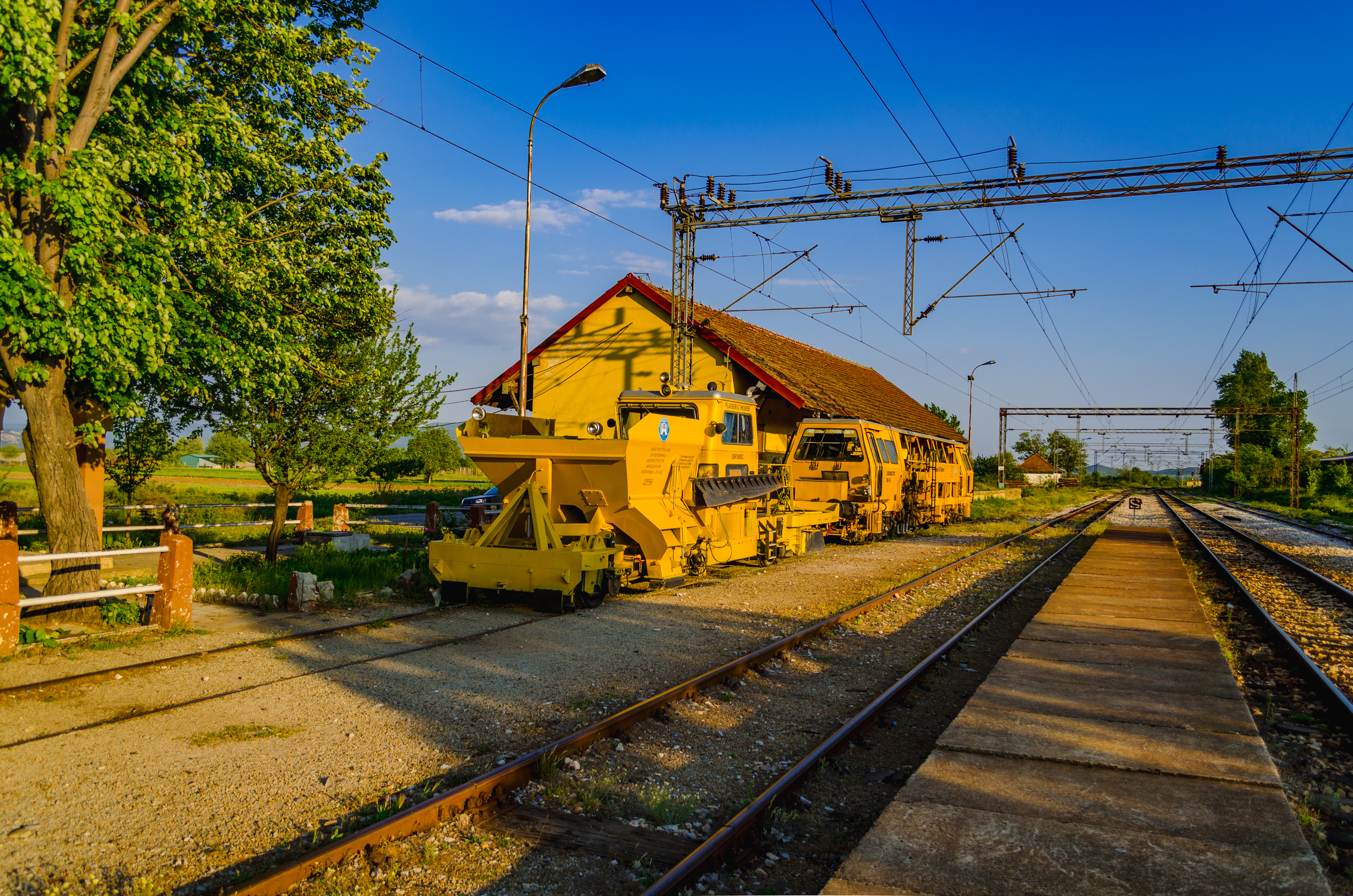
View of the station platforms

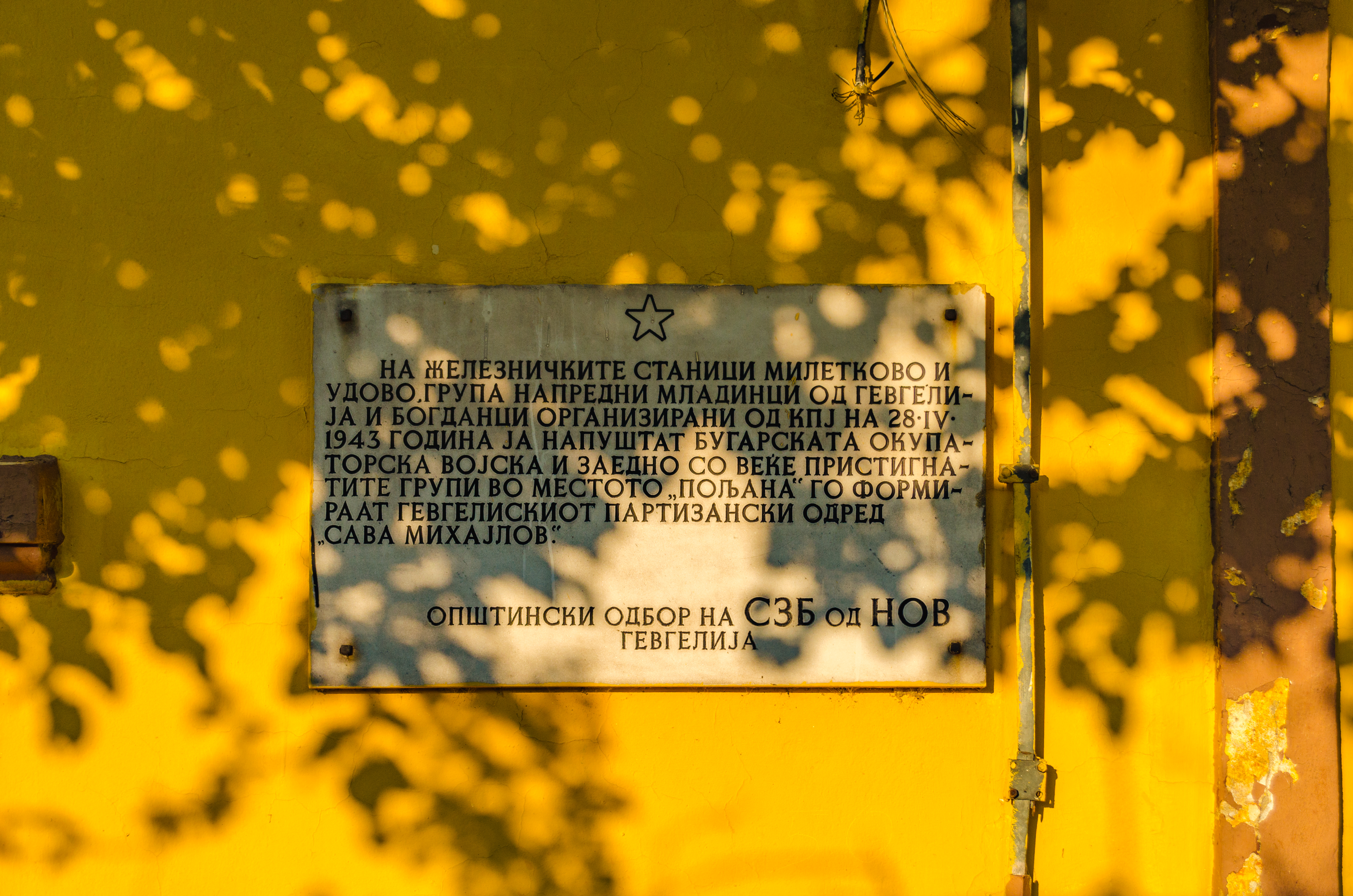
Commemorative plaque for the creation of the "Sava Mihajlov" partisan detachment
