= Konopiste =

Konopiste may refer to:

- Konopiště Castle, a castle in the Czech Republic
- Konopište, North Macedonia, a village in the Tikveš region
