= Korešnica =

Korešnica Корешница
- Village
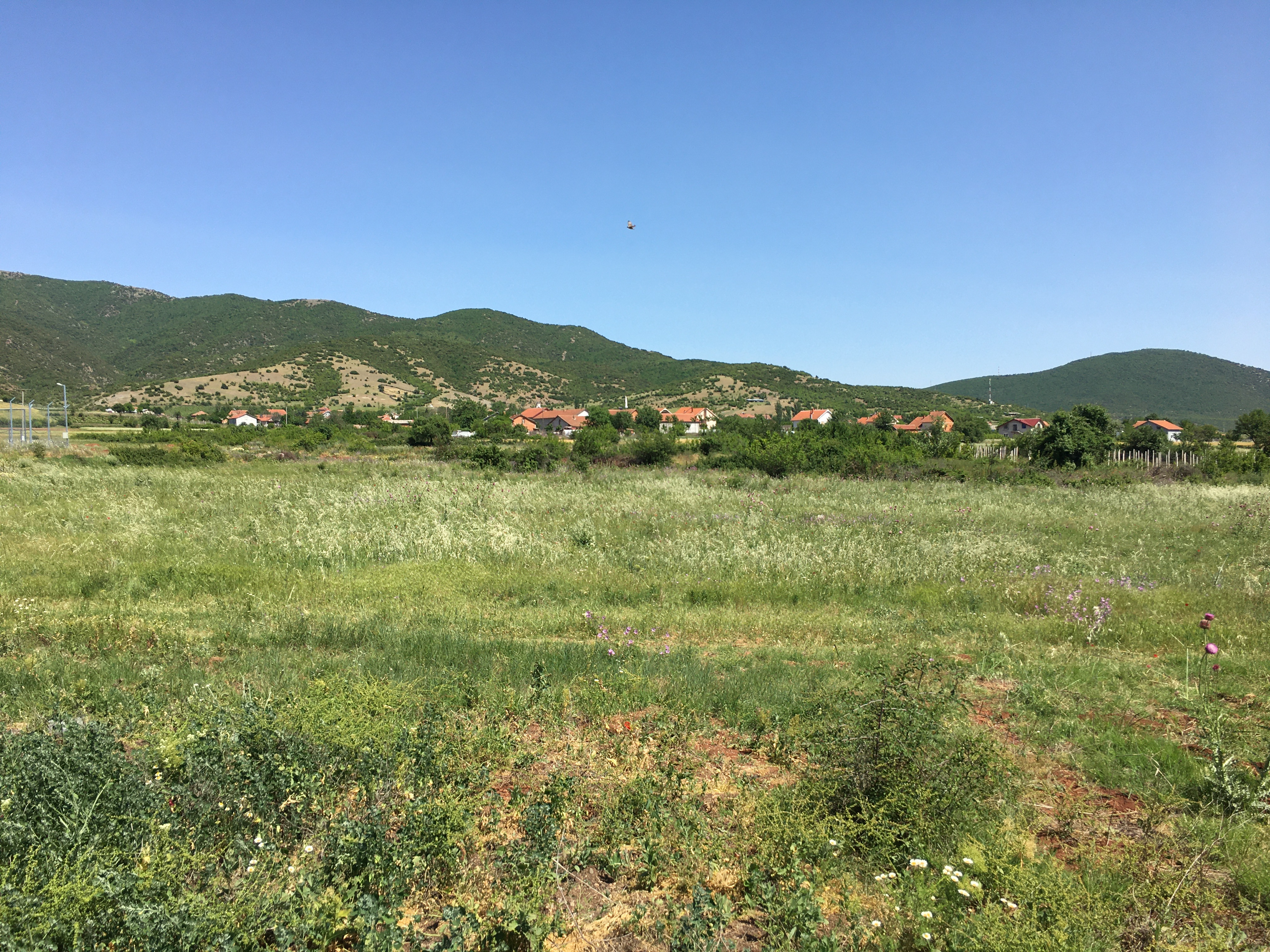
- View of the village

- Location within North Macedonia
- Country: North Macedonia
- Region: Vardar
- Municipality: Demir Kapija

Population (2021)
  - Total: 505
- Time zone: UTC+1 (CET)
  - Summer (DST): UTC+2 (CEST)
- Car plates: DK
- Climate: Cfa

Korešnica (Macedonian: Корешница) is the largest village in the municipality of Demir Kapija in North Macedonia. It is mixed ethnically Turks, Serbs, and ethnic Macedonians. It is seen from the main highway on the opposite side of Demir Kapija. Korešnica has several small festivals a year and an active village football club, which usually plays on these holidays. A company that develops asphalt is located here with another location near Klisura. Also, many village residents own livestock and produce dairy products such as white cheese.

== Demographics ==
According to the statistics of Bulgarian ethnographer Vasil Kanchov from 1900, 563 inhabitants lived in Korešnica, 530 Muslim Bulgarians, 18 Christian Bulgarians and 15 Romani. On the 1927 ethnic map of Leonhard Schulze-Jena, the village is written as "Kurešnica" and shown as a Muslim Bulgarian village. As of the 2021 census, Korešnica had 505 residents with the following ethnic composition:

- Turks 272;
- Macedonians 106;
- Serbs 103;
- Persons for whom data are taken from administrative sources 16;
- Roma 4;
- Albanians 4.

According to the 2002 census, the village had a total of 382 inhabitants. Ethnic groups in the village include:

- Turks 188;
- Macedonians 98;
- Serbs 94;
- Bosniaks 1;
- Albanians 1;
- Others 8.

== Sources ==
- Demir Kapija: From Prehistory to Today ISBN 9989-712-65-4, P 99
