= Čiflik, Demir Kapija =

Čiflik Чифлик
- Village
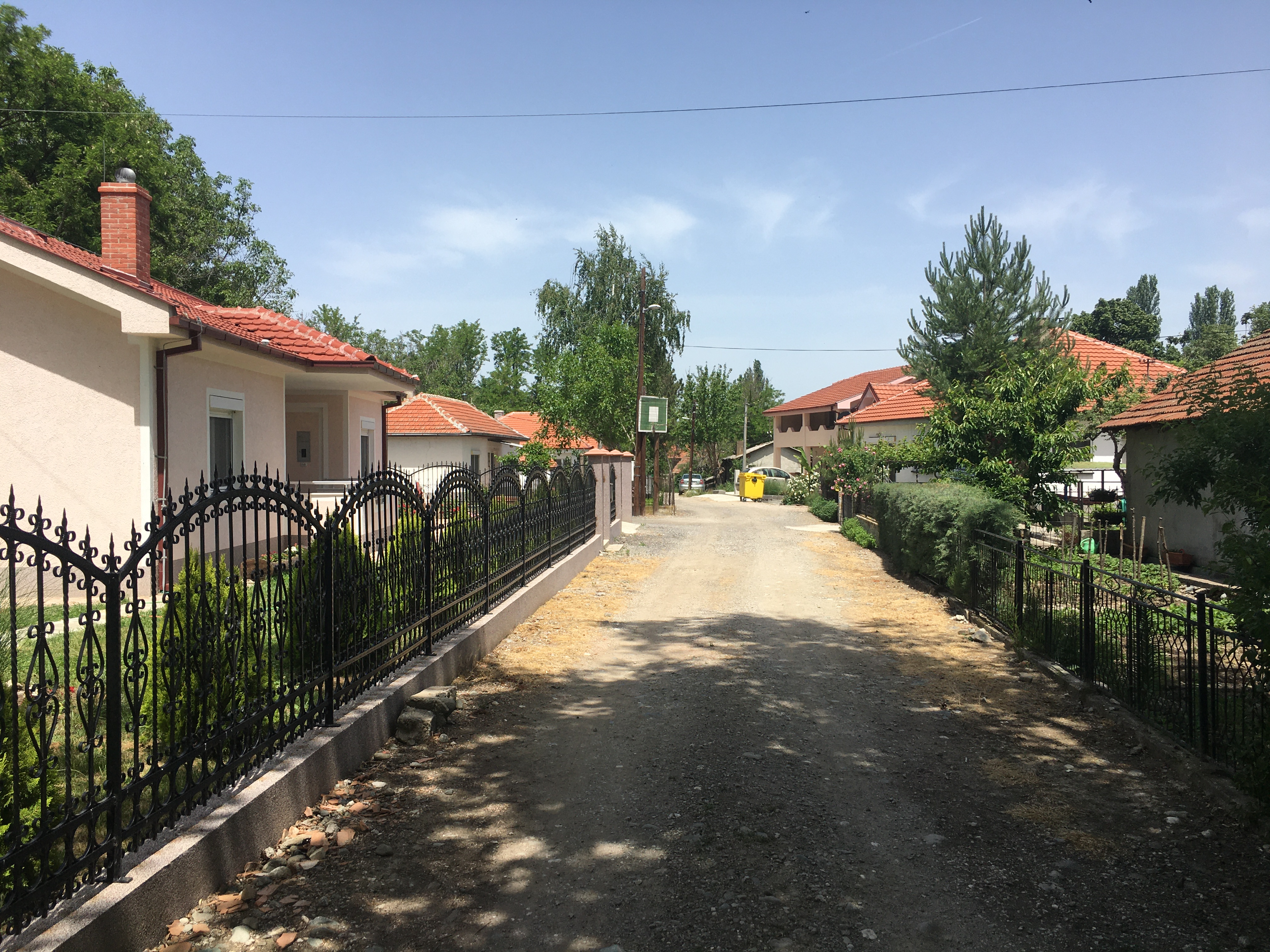
- Street in the village

- Location within North Macedonia
- Coordinates: 41°23′13″N 22°13′29″E
- Country: North Macedonia
- Region: Vardar
- Municipality: Demir Kapija

Population (2002)
  - Total: 90
- Time zone: UTC+1 (CET)
  - Summer (DST): UTC+2 (CEST)
- Car plates: DK
- Climate: Cfa

Čiflik (Macedonian: Чифлик) is a small village in Demir Kapija Municipality, North Macedonia. It is along the Došnica river which springs from Mount Kožuf. The river is the source of drinking and power production for the municipality. It is also home to some indigenous fish and often the spot of fishermen off the beaten path, enjoying a quiet afternoon. It is located on a turn-off-road about 4 km down the Demir Kapija road Partizanska just past the bridge.

== Demographics ==
According to the 2002 census, the village had a total of 90 inhabitants. Ethnic groups in the village include:

- Macedonians 89
- Others 1

== Notes ==
- Demir Kapija: From Prehistory to Today ISBN 9989-712-65-4, p 96
