= Strmaševo =

Village in Demir Kapija, North Macedonia

Strmaševo Стрмашево
- Village
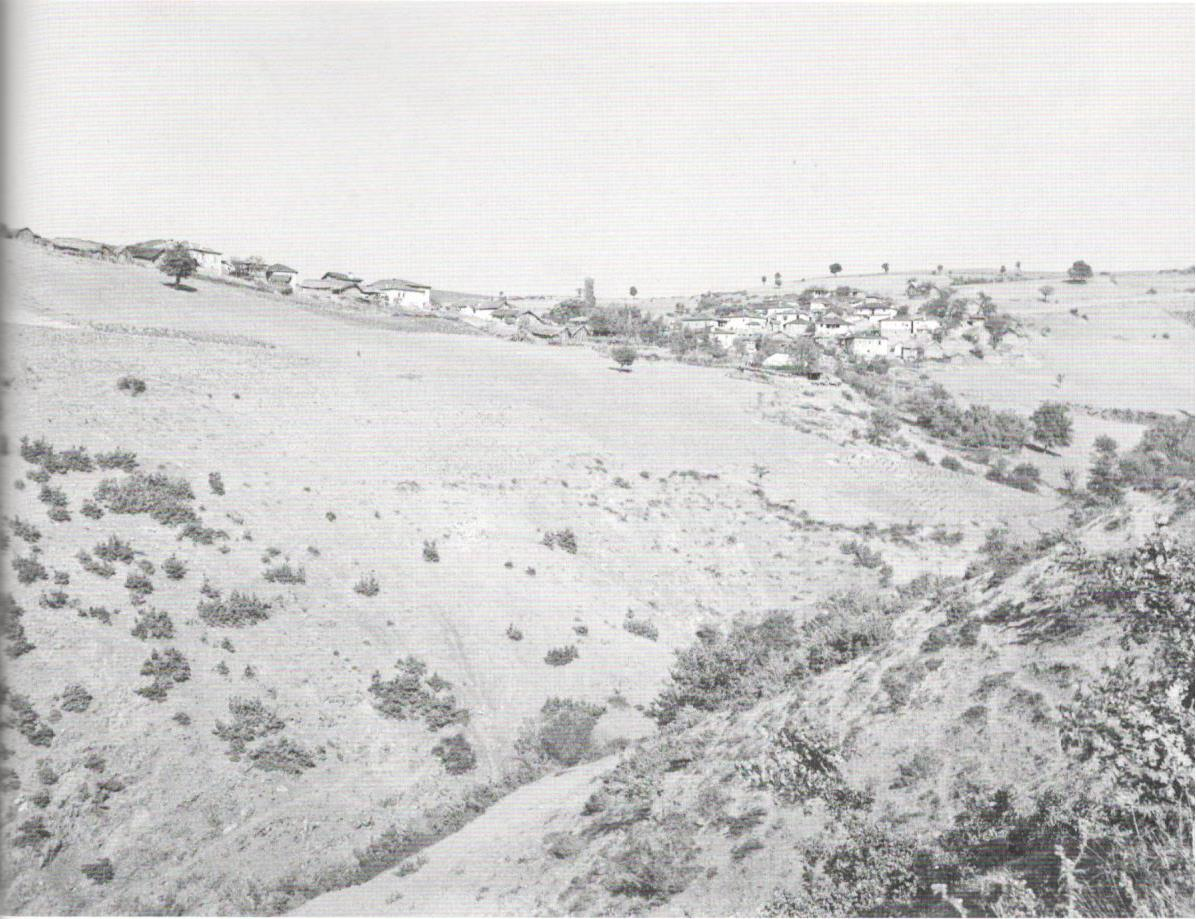
- Picture of Strmaševo from 1931

- Location within North Macedonia
- Country: North Macedonia
- Region: Vardar
- Municipality: Demir Kapija

Population (2002)
  - Total: 0
- Time zone: UTC+1 (CET)
  - Summer (DST): UTC+2 (CEST)
- Car plates: DK
- Climate: Cfa

Strmaševo (Macedonian: Стрмашево) is an abandoned village at the southernmost part of the municipality of Demir Kapija, North Macedonia. It was equal in size and close to Dračevica.

== Demographics ==
According to the 2002 census, the village had a total of 0 inhabitants.

== See also ==
- Demir Kapija municipality

== Sources ==
- Demir Kapija: From Prehistory to Today ISBN 9989-712-65-4, p 97-8
