= Glišić, Kavadarci =

Glišić Глишиќ
- Village
- Location within North Macedonia
- Coordinates: 41.451277°N 22.023908°E
- Country: North Macedonia
- Region: Vardar
- Municipality: Kavadarci

Population (2002)
  - Total: 1,562
- Time zone: UTC+1 (CET)
  - Summer (DST): UTC+2 (CEST)
- Website: .

Glišić (Macedonian: Глишиќ) is a village in the municipality of Kavadarci, North Macedonia.

== Demographics ==
According to the statistics of the Bulgarian ethnographer Vasil Kanchov from 1900 the settlement is recorded as Glišik (Глишикъ) and as having 284 inhabitants, 200 being Christian Bulgarians and 84 being Muslim Bulgarians. On the 1927 ethnic map of Leonhard Schulze-Jena, the village is shown as having a mixed population of Bulgarians and Muslim Bulgarians. According to the 2002 census, the village had a total of 1562 inhabitants. Ethnic groups in the village include:

- Macedonians 1547
- Serbs 5
- Aromanians 4
- Others 6
