= Begnište =

Begnište Бегниште
- Village
- Location within North Macedonia
- Coordinates: 41.367582°N 21.997472°E
- Country: North Macedonia
- Region: Vardar
- Municipality: Kavadarci

Population (2002)
  - Total: 369
- Time zone: UTC+1 (CET)
  - Summer (DST): UTC+2 (CEST)
- Website: .

Begnište (Macedonian: Бегниште) is a village in the municipality of Kavadarci, North Macedonia.

== Demographics ==
According to the statistics of the Bulgarian ethnographer Vasil Kanchov from 1900 the settlement is recorded as "Begništa" in which 860 inhabitants lived, all Cristian Bulgarians. On the 1927 ethnic map of Leonhard Schulze-Jena, the village is written as "Beglišta" and shown as a Christian Bulgarian village. According to the 2002 census, the village had a total of 369 inhabitants. Ethnic groups in the village include:

- Macedonians 368
- Serbs 1

== Etymology ==
The name of the village of Begnište derives from the combination of the word Beg which is the Turkic title for a chieftain, and the suffix (n)iste.
