= Barovo, Demir Kapija =

Barovo Барово
- Village
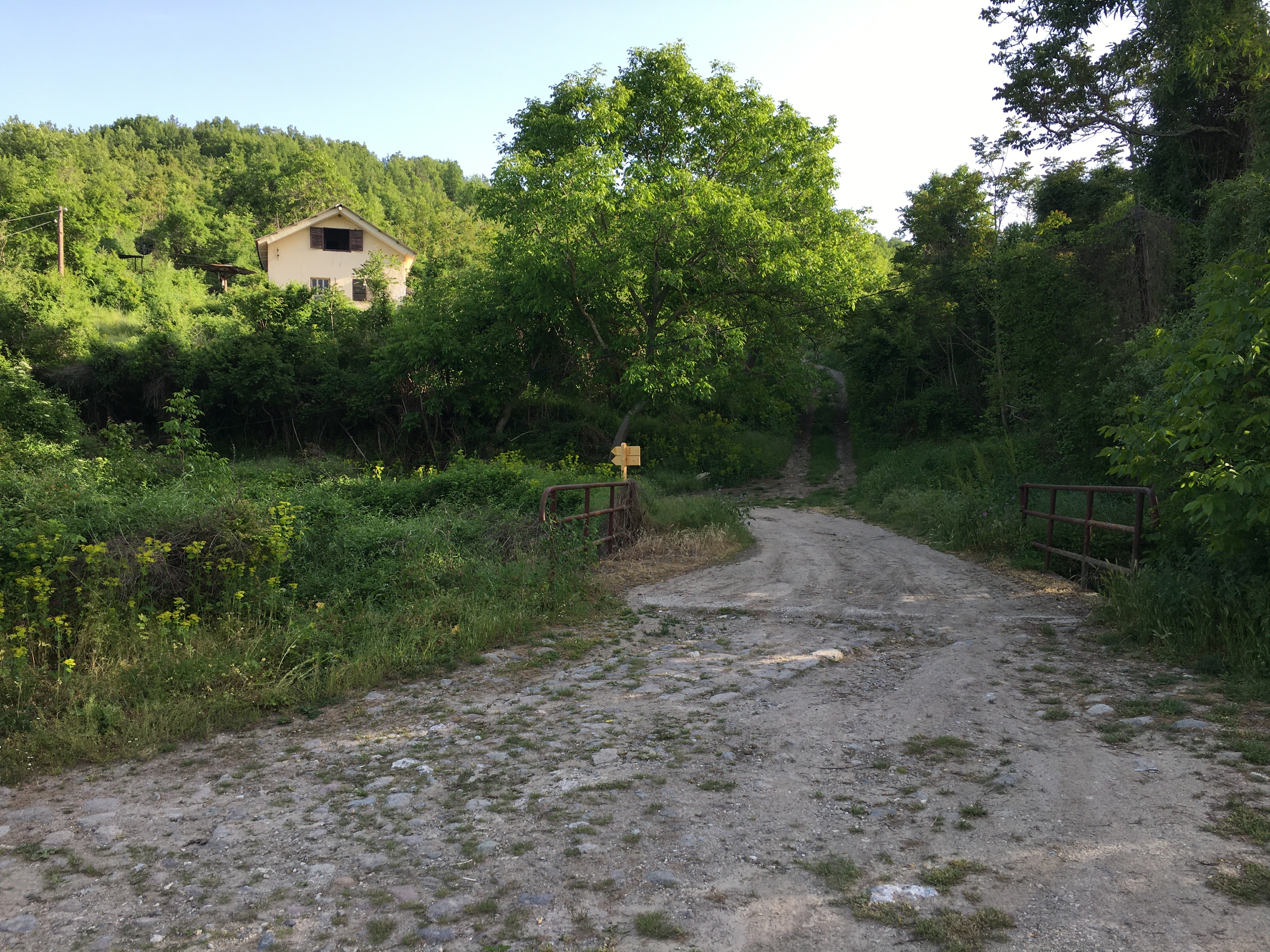
- View of the village

- Location within North Macedonia
- Coordinates: 41°20′38″N 22°08′26″E
- Country: North Macedonia
- Region: Vardar
- Municipality: Demir Kapija

Population (2002)
  - Total: 10
- Time zone: UTC+1 (CET)
  - Summer (DST): UTC+2 (CEST)
- Website: .

Barovo (Macedonian: Барово) is a village in the southern region of the Demir Kapija Municipality, North Macedonia. It is a point on many searchable satellite or internet maps. Barovo is settled in a wooded area, rather isolated on a road to the south of the town of Demir Kapija past the church. Barovo is the second inhabited village on this road to Konopište. The village church, built in 1868 unfortunately has fallen due to lack of inhabitants to care for it. Many Demir Kapija residents still use the land in or near Barovo to cultivate grapes. Some families still have a house standing there but there are very few villagers who are there nonstop.

== Demographics ==
According to the statistics of Bulgarian ethnographer Vasil Kanchov from 1900 the settlement is recorded as "Barevo" with 474 inhabitants. 248 being Muslim Bulgarians, 220 being Christian Bulgarians and 6 being Romani. According to the 2002 census, the village had a total of 10 inhabitants. Ethnic groups in the village include:

- Macedonians 9
- Turks 1

== Notes ==
- Demir Kapija: From Prehistory to Today ISBN 9989-712-65-4, p 96
