= Prždevo =

Prždevo Прждево
- Village
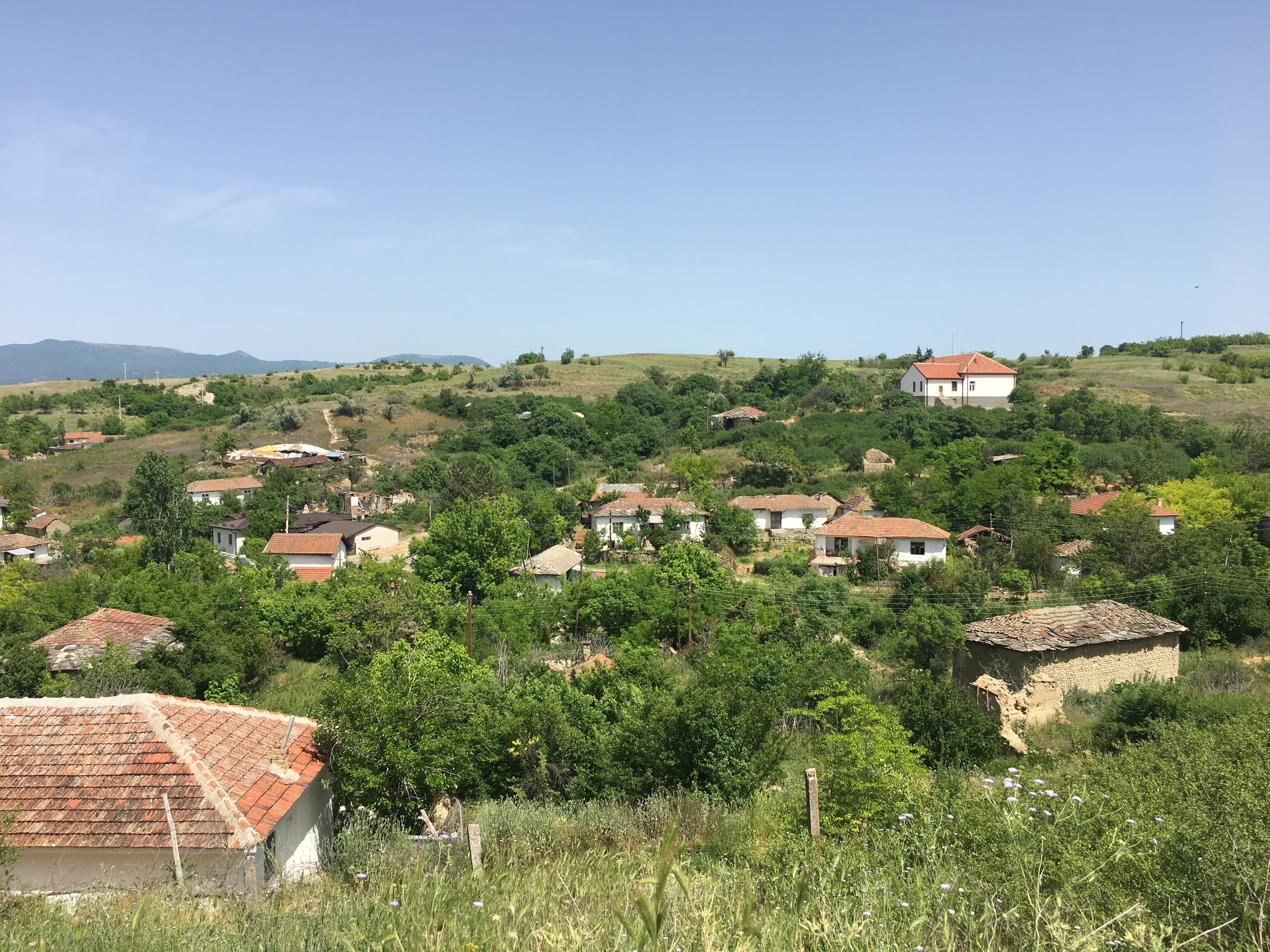
- View of the village

- Location within North Macedonia
- Country: North Macedonia
- Region: Vardar
- Municipality: Demir Kapija

Population (2002)
  - Total: 235
- Time zone: UTC+1 (CET)
  - Summer (DST): UTC+2 (CEST)
- Car plates: DK
- Climate: Cfa

Prždevo (Macedonian: Прждево) is a village with over 200 residents, located in North Macedonia. It had nearly 500 residents just 15 years ago, but many moved to larger areas. Even so, the village boasts a pepper factory and a winery, scheduled to open in 2008. It has a very old church, and is the crossroads for several other villages to the east and south. Many villagers are farmers and produce their own livestock for dairy products as well.

== Demographics ==
According to the statistics of Bulgarian ethnographer Vasil Kanchov from 1900, 1,765 inhabitants lived in Prždevo, 1,200 Muslim Bulgarians, 500 Christian Bulgarians and 65 Romani. On the 1927 ethnic map of Leonhard Schulze-Jena, the village is shown as having a mixed population of Christian Bulgarians and Muslim Bulgarians. According to the 2002 census, the village had a total of 235 inhabitants. Ethnic groups in the village include:

- Macedonians 210
- Turks 23
- Serbs 1
- Others 1

== See also ==
- Demir Kapija municipality

== Sources ==
- Demir Kapija: From Prehistory to Today ISBN 9989-712-65-4, p 97-8
