= Vehicle registration plates of North Macedonia =

Republic of North Macedonia
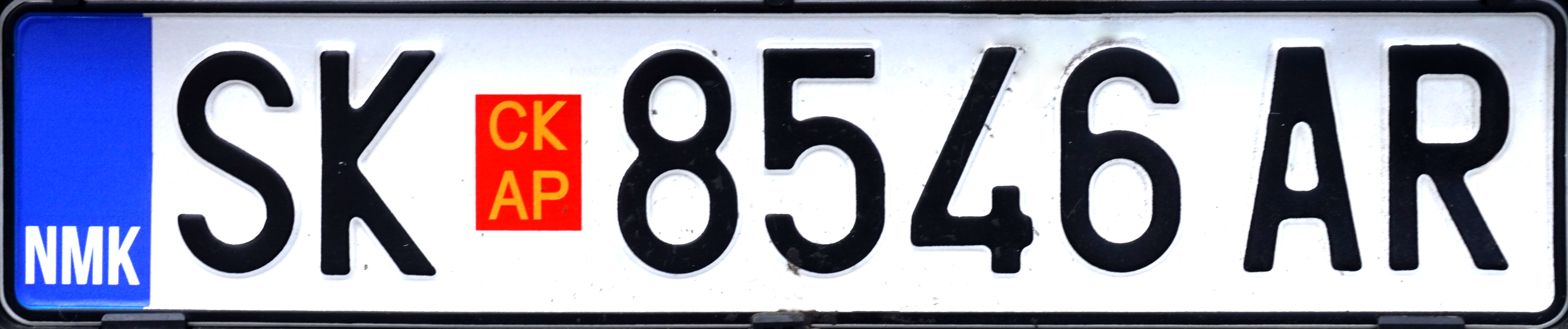
- NMK regular legal standard number plate.
- Country: North Macedonia
- Country code: NMK

Current series
- Size: 520 mm × 110 mm 20.5 in × 4.3 in
- Serial format: Not standard
- Colour (front): Black on white
- Colour (rear): Black on white

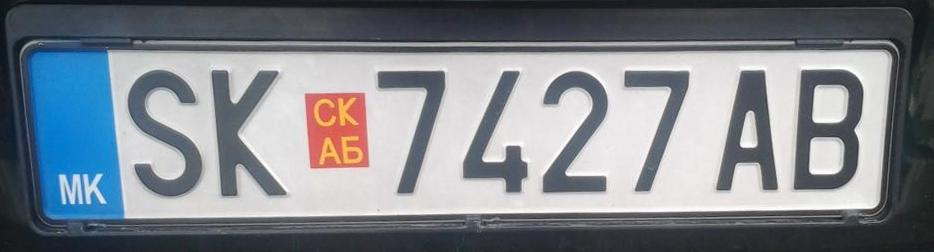
Former plate of the Republic of Macedonia (2012–2019)

Former plate of the Republic of Macedonia (1993–2012), but still in use

Map of current registration codes (2020–)

Map of registration codes by municipality (2019–2020)

Map of registration codes by municipality (2015–2019)

Map of old registration codes by municipality (2013–2015)

Map of old registration codes by municipality (2012–2013)

Map of old registration codes by municipality (1993–2012)

North Macedonia's vehicle registration plates consist of a two-letter region code, followed by a 4-digit numeric and a 2-letter alpha code (e.g. SK 1234 AB). Issuance of the new plates started on 20 February 2012, and they introduced a fourth digit and the blue field on the left side. The standard registration plates dimensions are 520 by 110 millimetres (20.5 in × 4.3 in). The international country code NMK is applied (formerly MK) on the blue field on the left side of the plate. NMK is only used in the car plates, while MK is still used for all other purposes. In February 2019, the country code was changed from MK to NMK, in accordance with the Prespa agreement which changed the country's name to Republic of North Macedonia. The new code is a mixture of English (North) and Macedonian (Македонија).

A red and yellow badge appears between the area code and the numeric part, containing the equivalent Cyrillic letters to the four Latin letters. The letters Q, W, X and Y are not used as they have no equivalents in Cyrillic.

== Codes ==
From 1993 to 20 February 2012, the ten existing codes were: BT, GV, KU, OH, PP, SK, SR, ST, TE, and VE.

On 20 February 2012, in addition to the ten existing codes, seven new codes were introduced: GE, KA, KI, KO, KP, RA, and SU.

On 1 March 2013, in addition to the seventeen existing codes, six new codes were introduced: BE, DE, NE, RE, SN, and VI.

On 1 September 2013, in addition to the twenty-three existing codes, one new code was introduced: VV.

On 4 July 2015, in addition to the twenty-four existing codes, seven new codes were introduced: DB, DK, MB, MK, KR, PS, and VA.

On 30 May 2019, in addition to the thirty-one existing codes, two new codes were introduced: DH and KS.

On 1 June 2020, in addition to the thirty-three existing codes, one new code was introduced: PE.

=== Current codes ===
Vehicle registration plate codes by municipalities in English alphabetical order:

Code	Region	Municipalities covered by the code	Appearance
BE	Berovo	Berovo	
BT	Bitola	Bitola, Mogila, Novaci	
DB	Debar	Debar, Centar Župa	
DE	Delčevo	Delčevo	
DH	Demir Hisar	Demir Hisar	
DK	Demir Kapija	Demir Kapija	
GE	Gevgelija	Gevgelija, Bogdanci, Dojran	
GV	Gostivar	Gostivar, Vrapčište, Mavrovo and Rostuša	
KA	Kavadarci	Kavadarci, Rosoman	
KI	Kičevo	Kičevo	
KO	Kočani	Kočani, Zrnovci, Češinovo-Obleševo	
KR	Kratovo	Kratovo	
KP	Kriva Palanka	Kriva Palanka, Rankovce	
KS	Kruševo	Kruševo	
KU	Kumanovo	Kumanovo, Lipkovo, Staro Nagoričane	
MB	Makedonski Brod	Makedonski Brod, Plasnica	100x
MK	Makedonska Kamenica	Makedonska Kamenica	
NE	Negotino	Negotino	
OH	Ohrid	Ohrid, Debarca	
PE	Pehčevo	Pehčevo	
PP	Prilep	Prilep, Dolneni, Krivogaštani	
PS	Probištip	Probištip	
RA	Radoviš	Radoviš, Konče	
RE	Resen	Resen	
SK	Skopje	Skopje, Aračinovo, Zelenikovo, Ilinden, Petrovec, Sopište, Studeničani, Čučer-Sandevo	
SN	Sveti Nikole	Sveti Nikole, Lozovo	
SU	Struga	Struga	
SR	Strumica	Strumica, Bosilovo, Vasilevo, Novo Selo	
ST	Štip	Štip, Karbinci	
TE	Tetovo	Tetovo, Bogovinje, Brvenica, Želino, Jegunovce, Tearce	
VA	Valandovo	Valandovo	
VE	Veles	Veles, Gradsko, Čaška	
VI	Vinica	Vinica	
VV	Vevčani	Vevčani	

=== Obsolete license plate codes ===
Code	Location	Notes
ŠT	Štip	Changed to ST with the new style plates in 2012, to avoid the use of diacritics. (The Cyrillic also changed correspondingly from ШТ to СТ.)
TV	Titov Veles	The city changed its name back from Titov Veles to Veles in 1996. These plates were phased out. Veles was assigned the new code VE.

== Critical reception ==
The new europlates are criticised from several design experts and the Macedonian public who insist on using hybrid alphabet instead of Latin script (only the common letters for Cyrillic and Latin scripts to be used). They sent a remark to the constitutional court of North Macedonia and the decision is yet to be declared. The MK/NMK code is also disputed for being placed low. Due to the Macedonia naming dispute, Greece followed a standard policy in which Greek border guards covered the letters MK on vehicle plates with a sticker, in Greek and English, reading: "Recognized by Greece as FYROM”.

== Special plates ==
- Diplomatic corps plate had black background and plate consists of two numbers indicating the country or diplomatic mission, two letters CC (for consular corps) or CD (for Diplomatic Corps) and then numbers.
- Dealer plates had the band of text of region and then "ПРОБА". The bottom group exactly like older Yugoslav plates, but without the star.
- Temporary plates for foreign residents use a system whereby the final letter of the group of two is replaced by the digit 9.
- Police plates have six numbers in two groups and the font is blue. (rear only)
- Taxi plates are the same as civilian plates, the only difference is that they have a yellow background.
- Government plates are also the same as civilian plates, except they have yellow letters and red background.

== List of Diplomatic Corps and International Organizations codes ==
Code	Country or International Organization
01	Slovenia
02	Turkey
03	United Kingdom
04	Germany
05	Denmark
06	China
07	Bulgaria
08	Sweden
09	France
10	Switzerland
11	Netherlands
12	Albania
13	Belgium
14	Bosnia
15	Russia
16	Italy
17	Finland
18	Japan
19	Romania
20	Czech Republic
21	Spain
22	Austria
23	Croatia
24	Egypt
25	United States
26	South Korea
27	Greece
28	Hungary
29	Serbia
30	Iran
31	Poland
32	Thailand
33	Canada
34	Norway
35	Israel
36	European Union
37	Sovereign Military Order of Malta
38	Ukraine
39	Slovakia
40	Australia
41	Georgia
42	Ireland
43	Ghana
44	Montenegro
45	Moldova
46	Lithuania
47	Qatar
48	Vietnam
50	Kosovo
51	Azerbaijan
52	Peru
53	Latvia
55	India
56	Uruguay
57	Iceland
58	Morocco
60	Vatican City
61	Jordan
62	Indonesia
63	Estonia
64	Gabon
65	Mongolia
66	South Africa
67	Guinea
68	Bangladesh
69	Cuba
70	Saudi Arabia
71	Angola
72	Togo
73	Armenia
74	Belarus
75	United Arab Emirates
76	Burkina Faso
Code	International Organization
79	EUPOL PROXIMA
81	European Agency for Reconstruction
82	UNMIK
85	WHO / World Health Organization
86	NATO / North Atlantic Treaty Organization
87	IOM / International Organization for Migration
88	WFP / World Food Programme
89	ICRC
90	European Central Bank
91	UNHCR
92	OSCE / Organization for Security and Co-operation in Europe
93	UNICEF
94	Deutsche Gesellschaft für Internationale Zusammenarbeit
95	United Nations
96	IMF
97	IBRD
100	Council of Europe
101	UNDP
102	Goethe Institut
103	United Nations Office for Project Services
107	United Nations Resident Coordinator Office (UN-RCO)
114	Balkan Medical Task Force
120	Kazakhstan

== Gallery ==
Macedonian vanity plate

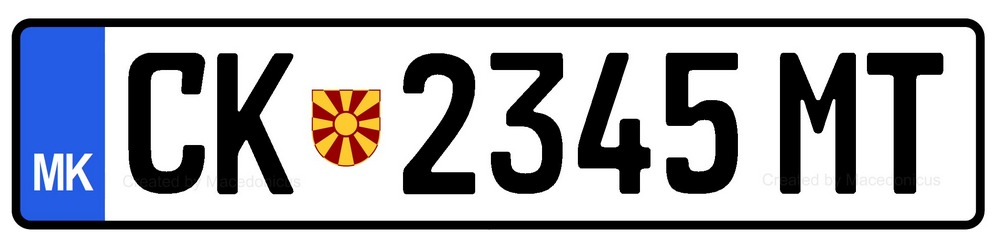
Proposal for the new plates for the Republic of Macedonia (formerly MK, since February 2019 NMK).

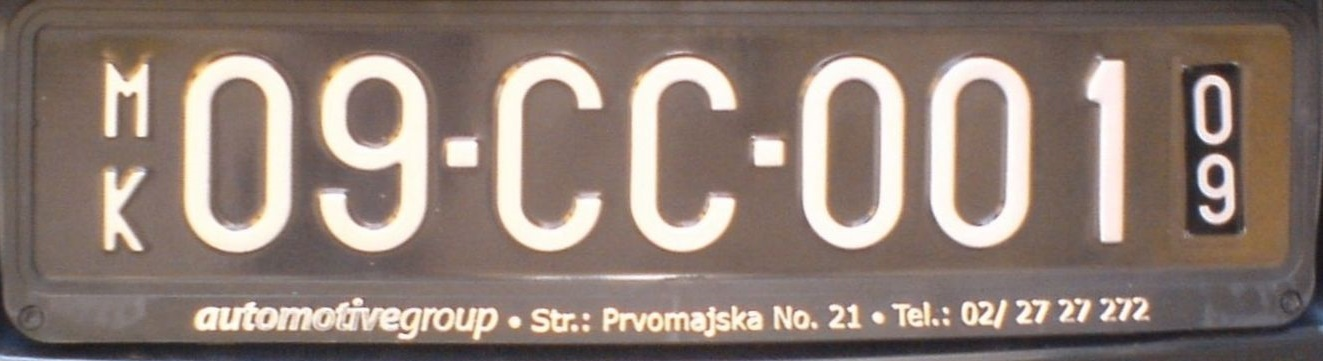
Diplomatic license plates of the French consular office in North Macedonia.

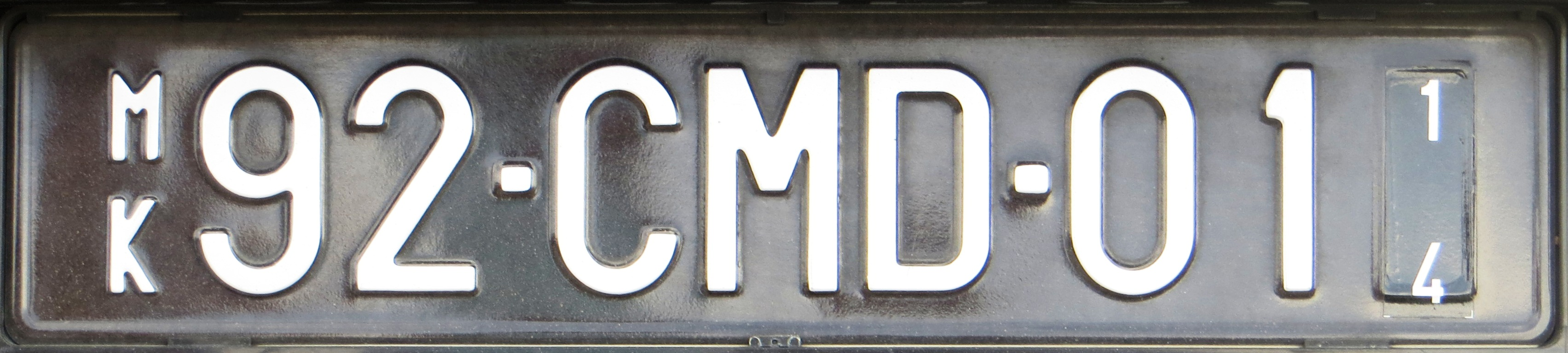

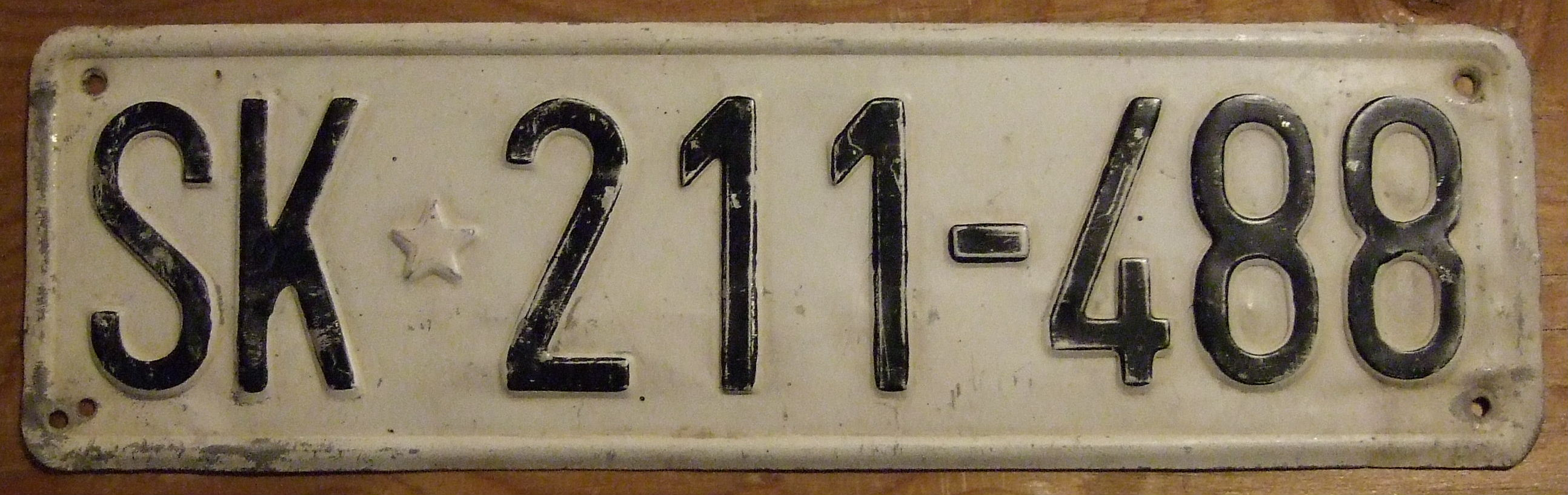
An old SFRY plate from Skopje
