= List of twin towns and sister cities in North Macedonia =

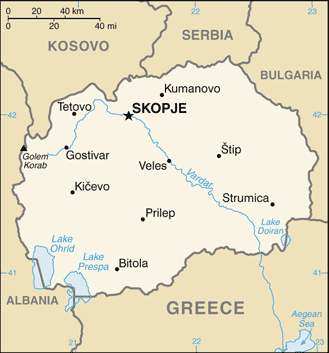
Map of North Macedonia

This is a list of municipalities in North Macedonia which have standing links to local communities in other countries known as "town twinning" (usually in Europe) or "sister cities" (usually in the rest of the world).

== B ==
Bitola

- Bayside, Australia
- Bursa, Turkey
- Épinal, France
- Kranj, Slovenia
- Osijek, Croatia
- Pleven, Bulgaria
- Požarevac, Serbia
- Rijeka, Croatia
- Stari Grad (Belgrade), Serbia
- Trelleborg, Sweden
- Veliko Tarnovo, Bulgaria

== D ==
Delčevo

- Blagoevgrad, Bulgaria
- Bornova, Turkey
- Goražde, Bosnia and Herzegovina
- Jagodina, Serbia
- Mladost (Varna), Bulgaria
- Simitli, Bulgaria
- Vyshhorod, Ukraine
- Żyrardów, Poland

Demir Hisar

- Prijedor, Bosnia and Herzegovina

== G ==
Gevgelija

- Inđija, Serbia
- Jablanica, Bosnia and Herzegovina
- Nova Gorica, Slovenia
- Pazin, Croatia
- Sevlievo, Bulgaria

Gostivar

- Akhisar, Turkey
- Kilis, Turkey
- Smolyan, Bulgaria
- Stari Grad (Sarajevo), Bosnia and Herzegovina

== K ==
Kavadarci

- Boljevac, Serbia
- Bucha, Ukraine
- Dobrich, Bulgaria
- Gornji Milanovac, Serbia
- Kemalpaşa, Turkey
- Kovin, Serbia
- Makarska, Croatia
- Năsăud, Romania
- Panagyurishte, Bulgaria
- Pernik, Bulgaria
- Pleven, Bulgaria
- Rožaje, Montenegro
- Yiwu, China

Kičevo

- Vratsa, Bulgaria

Kočani

- Kazanlak, Bulgaria
- Kranj, Slovenia
- Križevci, Croatia
- Pereiaslav, Ukraine
- Szigetszentmiklós, Hungary

Kratovo

- Kolomyia, Ukraine

Kriva Palanka

- Bansko, Bulgaria
- Dupnitsa, Bulgaria
- Lugoj, Romania
- Mława, Poland
- Perechyn, Ukraine
- Svidník, Slovakia
- Vršac, Serbia
- Županja, Croatia

Kumanovo

- Banja Luka, Bosnia and Herzegovina
- Bijeljina, Bosnia and Herzegovina
- Câmpina, Romania
- Çorlu, Turkey
- Čukarica (Belgrade), Serbia
- Gabrovo, Bulgaria
- Gjilan, Kosovo
- Gornji Milanovac, Serbia
- Leskovac, Serbia
- Nikšić, Montenegro
- Novi Sad, Serbia
- Pančevo, Serbia
- Plovdiv, Bulgaria
- Vranje, Serbia

== N ==
Negotino

- Črnomelj, Slovenia
- Gradiška, Bosnia and Herzegovina
- Nagykáta, Hungary

== O ==
Ohrid

- Budva, Montenegro
- Caen, France
- Givatayim, Israel
- Inđija, Serbia
- Kragujevac, Serbia
- Mostar, Bosnia and Herzegovina
- Ogrodzieniec, Poland
- Pogradec, Albania
- Piran, Slovenia
- Safranbolu, Turkey
- Stari Grad (Sarajevo), Bosnia and Herzegovina
- Vidovec, Croatia
- Vinkovci, Croatia
- Windsor, Canada
- Wollongong, Australia
- Yalova, Turkey

== P ==
Prilep

- Asenovgrad, Bulgaria
- Chernihiv, Ukraine
- Garfield, United States
- Tire, Turkey
- Topoľčany, Slovakia
- Vincent, Australia

Probištip

- Aleksinac, Serbia

== R ==
Radoviš

- Aliağa, Turkey
- Belišće, Croatia
- Çınarcık, Turkey
- Contursi Terme, Italy
- Dryanovo, Bulgaria
- Ergene, Turkey
- Kamianets-Podilskyi, Ukraine
- Selçuk, Turkey
- Taşköprü, Turkey
- Teteven, Bulgaria
- Vaslui, Romania
- Velika Plana, Serbia
- Zaprudnya, Russia

Rosoman

- Bergama, Turkey

== S ==
Skopje

- Bradford, England, United Kingdom
- Chlef, Algeria
- Dijon, France
- Dresden, Germany
- Istanbul, Turkey
- İzmir, Turkey
- Ljubljana, Slovenia
- Manisa, Turkey
- Nanchang, China
- Nuremberg, Germany
- Pittsburgh, United States
- Podgorica, Montenegro
- Roubaix, France
- Sarajevo, Bosnia and Herzegovina
- Suez, Egypt
- Tempe, United States
- Tirana, Albania
- Waremme, Belgium
- Zagreb, Croatia
- Zaragoza, Spain

Skopje – Aerodrom

- Pazardzhik, Bulgaria

Skopje – Centar

- Beyoğlu, Turkey
- Stari Grad (Belgrade), Serbia

Skopje – Gjorče Petrov

- Kraljevo, Serbia
- Krasna Polyana (Sofia), Bulgaria
- Kuşadası, Turkey
- Považská Bystrica, Slovakia

Skopje – Karpoš

- New Belgrade (Belgrade), Serbia
- Sremski Karlovci, Serbia
- Stari Grad (Sarajevo), Bosnia and Herzegovina
- Tivat, Montenegro
- Travnik, Bosnia and Herzegovina
- Triaditsa (Sofia), Bulgaria
- Vrnjačka Banja, Serbia

Štip

- Balıkesir, Turkey
- Gyöngyös, Hungary
- Kavarna, Bulgaria
- Split, Croatia

Struga

- Mangalia, Romania
- Waterbury, United States

Strumica

- Bijelo Polje, Montenegro
- Copceac, Moldova
- Elektrostal, Russia
- Grójec, Poland
- Piacenza, Italy

== T ==
Tetovo

- Konya, Turkey
- Sterling Heights, United States

== V ==
Veles

- Çan, Turkey
- Celje, Slovenia
- Karşıyaka, Turkey
- Nowogard, Poland
- Princes' Islands, Turkey
- Samobor, Croatia
- Slobozia, Romania
- Sombor, Serbia
- Svishtov, Bulgaria
- Thermaikos, Greece
- Užice, Serbia
- Zenica, Bosnia and Herzegovina
