= Bistrenci =

Bistrenci Бистренци
- Village
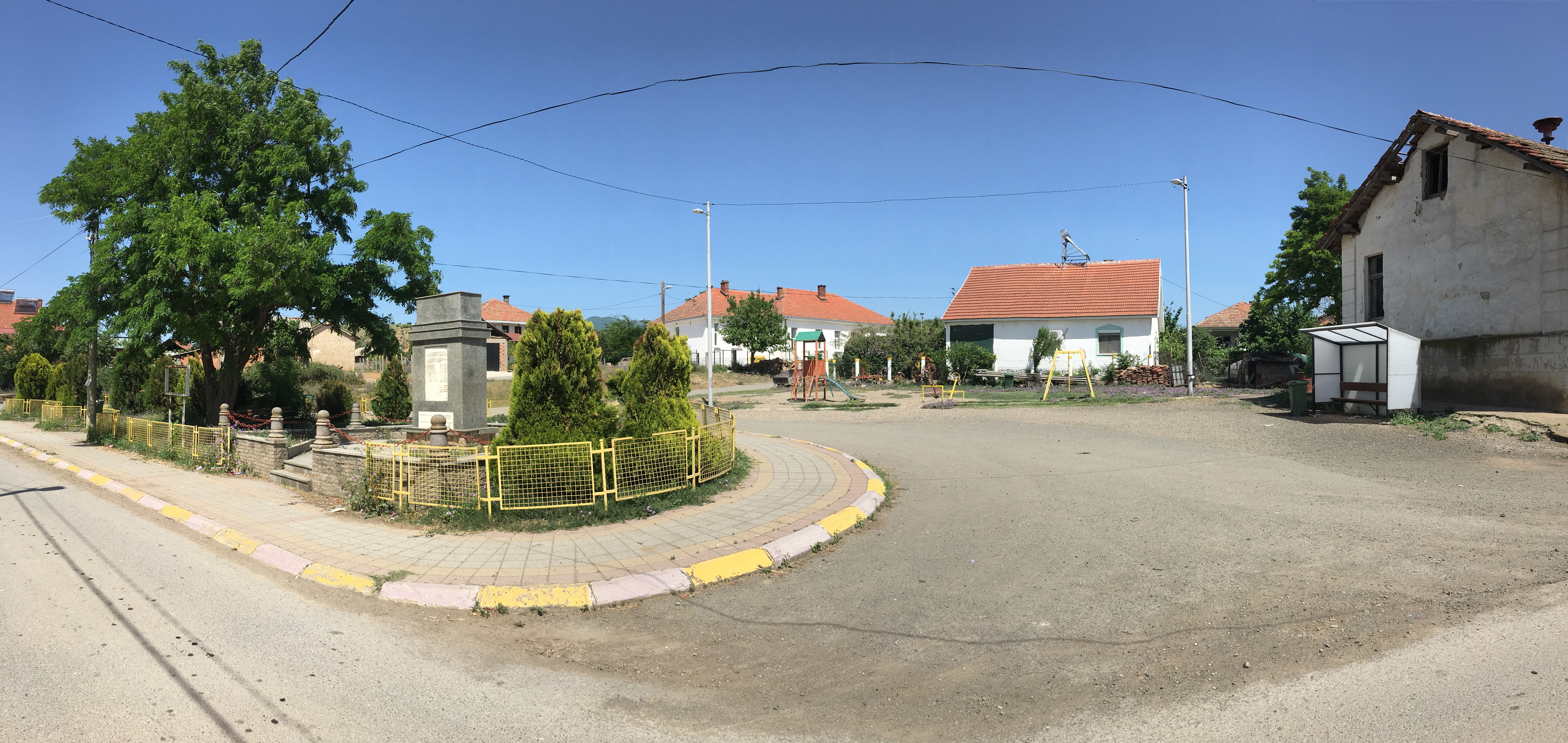
- View of the village

- Location within North Macedonia
- Coordinates: 41°27′N 22°12′E
- Country: North Macedonia
- Region: Vardar
- Municipality: Demir Kapija

Population (2002)
  - Total: 364
- Time zone: UTC+1 (CET)
  - Summer (DST): UTC+2 (CEST)
- Car plates: DK
- Climate: Cfa

Bistrenci (Macedonian: Бистренци) is one of the larger villages in Demir Kapija Municipality. Its population is mixed among Turks, ethnic Macedonians, and Vlachs. It had its roots in the Ottoman period until the Slovenes came to harvest grapes. The Catholic church was then built. Many Turks stayed and still live in the village to this day. The Slovenes stayed until World War II, and the Macedonians inhabited the village afterwards and erected a Christian Orthodox community. To this day, the village is one of the few with a Mosque, which has been recently rebuilt, a Catholic church, and an Orthodox church. The Slovenian Embassy recently built a park commemorating soldiers killed in World War II. The village celebrates its patron holiday, coined Panagjur, on October 27.

== Demographics ==
On the 1927 ethnic map of Leonhard Schulze-Jena, the village is shown as a Muslim Bulgarian village. According to the 2002 census, the village had a total of 364 inhabitants. Ethnic groups in the village include:

- Macedonians 315
- Turks 39
- Serbs 3
- Albanians 3
- Others 4

== See also ==
- Demir Kapija municipality

== Sources ==
- Demir Kapija: From Prehistory to Today. ISBN 9989-712-65-4, P 97-8
