= Dren (name) =

- Gender: Male

Origin
- Meaning: Deer (Albanian); Cornus mas (Serbian)
- Region of origin: Balkans

Dren, also spelled Drin, is a given name.

It is used as a masculine given name in Albanian culture. The origin of this name comes from the Albanian word dren (Gheg Albanian); dre (Standard Albanian), which means deer. The feminine form is Drenusha (female deer).

The word "Dren" (Дрен) means dogwood or specifically European Cornel (Cornus mas) in Serbian.

== People ==
- Dren Abazi (born 1985), Kosovar Albanian singer and songwriter
- Dren Feka (born 1997), Kosovo Albanian footballer
- Dren Hodja (born 1994), Albanian footballer
- Dren Mandić, Serbian climber, one of the fatalities of the 2008 K2 disaster.
- Dren McDonald, American musician
- Dren Terrnava (born 2005), Finnish footballer

== Fictional characters ==
- Dren, the name of the character Kish in the English adaptation (Mew Mew Power) of the anime series Tokyo Mew Mew
- Dren, a human hybrid creature in the 2010 movie Splice
