= Kožuf =

Mountain in North Macedonia and Greece

- Tzena, Zona
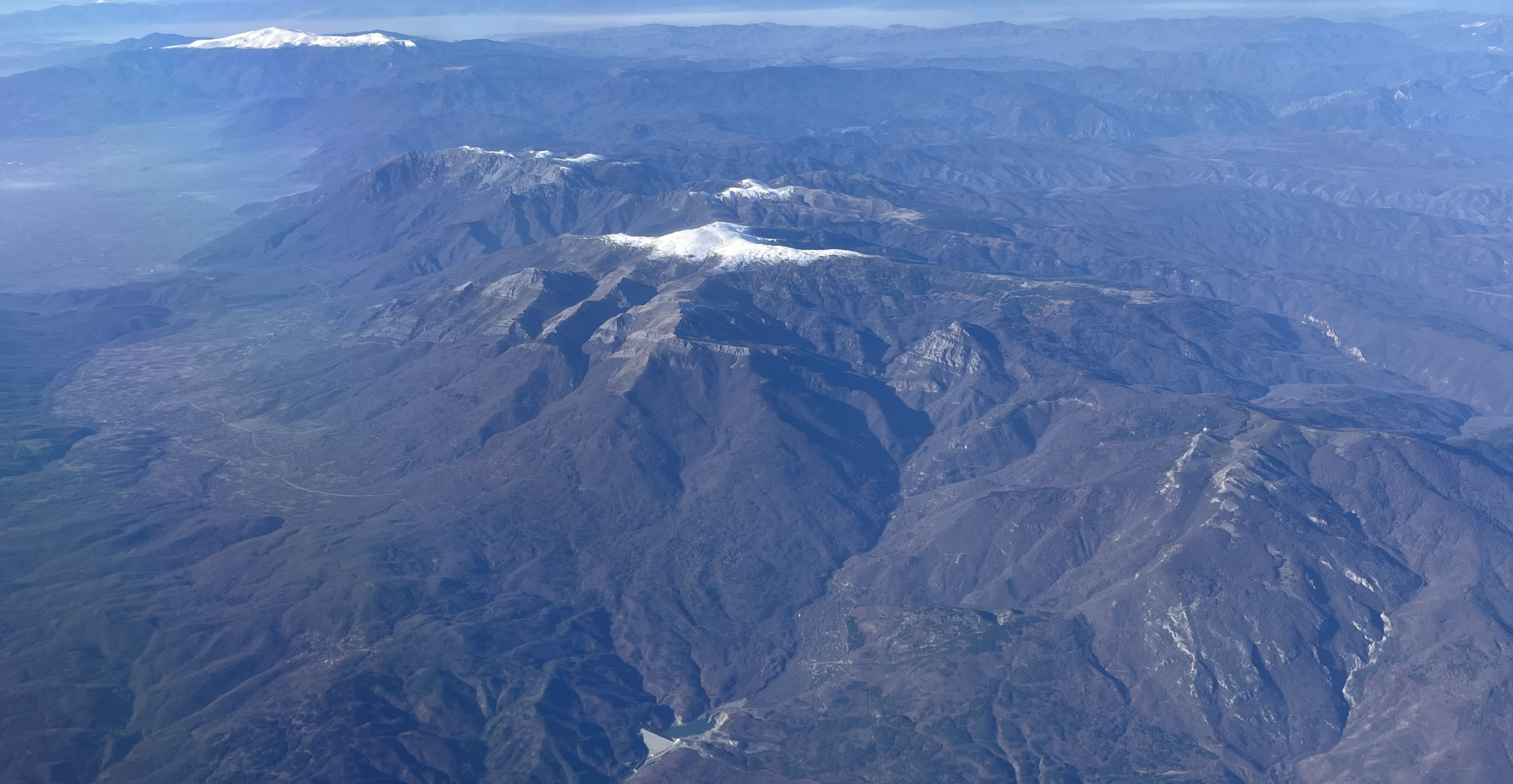

Highest point
- Elevation: 2,172 m (7,126 ft)
- Prominence: 1,006 m (3,301 ft)
- Coordinates: 41°13′00″N 22°10′00″E

Geography
- Location within North Macedonia
- Location: Border between North Macedonia and Greece

Kožuf Mountain (Macedonian: Кожуф Планина) or Tzena / Zona (Greek: Τζένα/Tzena, Ζώνα/Zona) is a mountain situated in the southern part of North Macedonia and northern part of Greece. Associated village names are Konopište, Kavadarci and Gevgelija. Smrdliva Voda is a mineral springwater site on its northeastern flank. Kavadarci Municipality and Gevgelija Municipality split the mountain.

Its most western parts reach the river Blashnica, and the north-western side stretches in a line, from the Mrezhichko village via the village of Konopište, through the course of Boshava to the city of Demir Kapija. Kožuf is a specific mountain because it is the first natural barrier in North Macedonia that is directly exposed to the influences of the Mediterranean and the Aegean Sea. Its highest peak is Zelen Breg (or Portes), at 2,172 meters above the sea level.

A new and modern ski center, whose construction began in 2001, was opened in 2009 on the mountain.

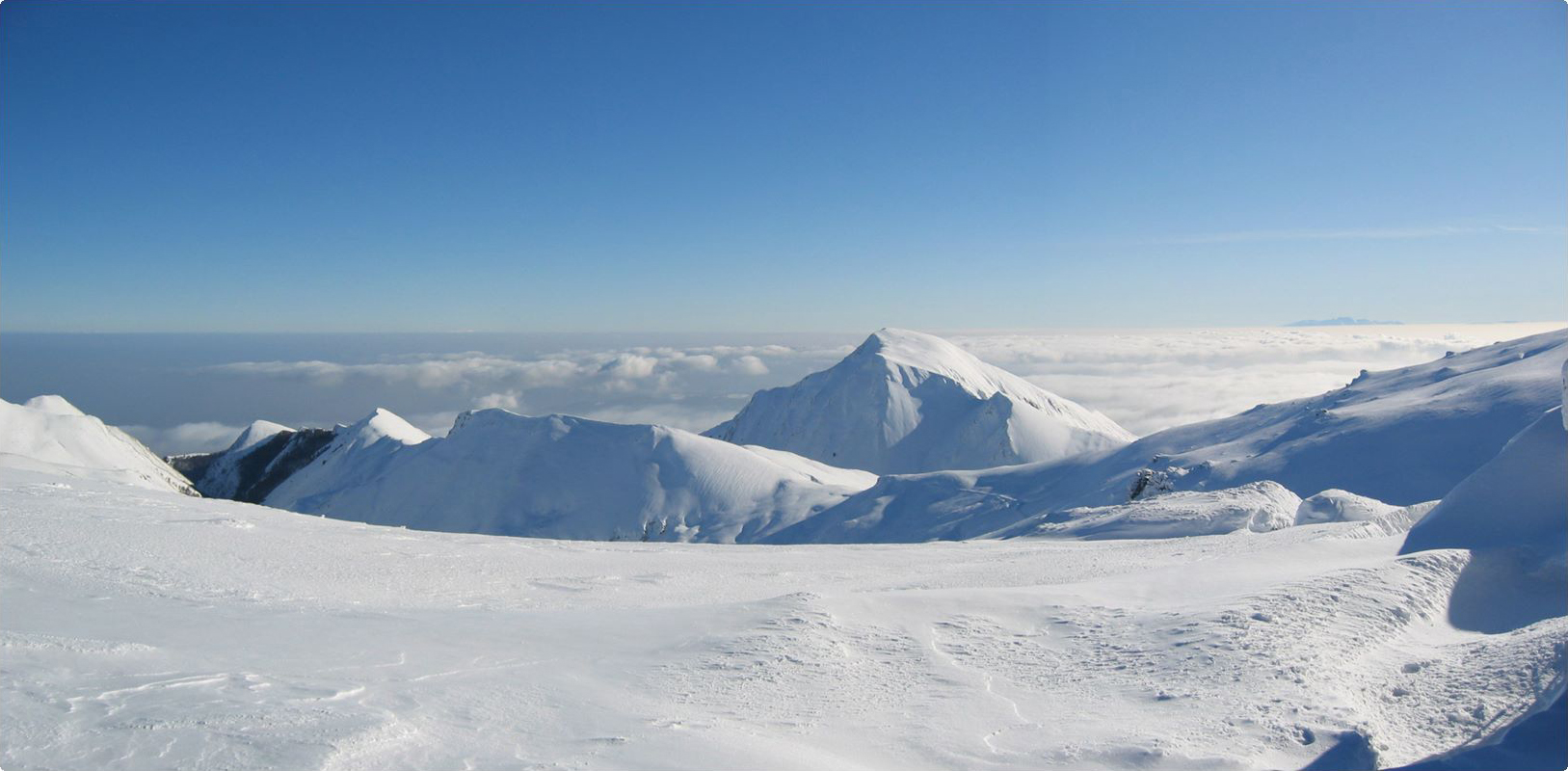
Panorama of Kožuf
