= Došnica =

River in North Macedonia

Coordinates: 41.39562°N 22.22260°E

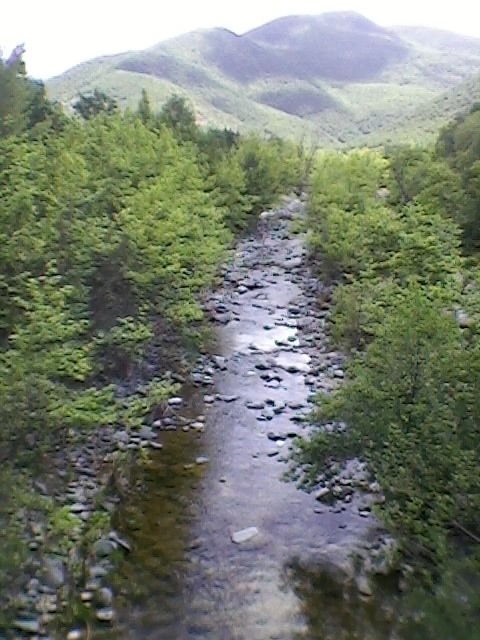
Došnica

The Došnica river is a river in North Macedonia. It is a right tributary to the Crna Reka between Tikveš plain and the Vardar. It springs from Koprišnica Falls and Mount Kožuf. A hydroelectric power plant is located on the river at Čiflik, Demir Kapija.
