= Demir Kapija Municipality =

Municipality of North Macedonia

Demir Kapija Municipality Општина Демир Капија
- Urban municipality
- Flag Coat of arms

- Coordinates: 41°24′32″N 22°14′38″E
- Country: North Macedonia
- Region: Vardar
- Municipal seat: Demir Kapija

Government
  - Mayor: Lazar Petrov (SDSM)

Area
  - Total: 311.06 km^{2} (120.10 sq mi)
- Elevation: 202 m (663 ft)

Population
  - Total: 3,777
  - Density: 12.14/km^{2} (31.45/sq mi)
- Time zone: UTC+1 (CET)
- Postal Code: 1442
- Area Code: 034
- Vehicle registration: DK
- Website: www.demirkapija.gov.mk

Demir Kapija (Macedonian: Демир Капија [ˌdɛmir ˈkapija]) is a municipality in southern part of North Macedonia. Demir Kapija, which means "iron door" or "iron gate" in Turkish, is also the name of the town where the municipal seat is found. Demir Kapija Municipality is part of the Vardar Statistical Region.

== Geography ==
The Došnica river which springs from Mount Kožuf is the source of drinking water and hydroelectric power production (at Čiflik) for the municipality.

The municipality borders

- Negotino Municipality to the northwest,
- Konče Municipality to the northeast,
- Valandovo Municipality to the east,
- Gevgelija Municipality to the southeast, and
- Kavadarci Municipality to the southwest.

== Demographics ==
According to the 2021 North Macedonia census, this municipality has 3,777 inhabitants. Ethnic groups in the municipality include:

	2002		2021	
	Number	%	Number	%
TOTAL	4,545	100	3,777	100
Macedonians	3,997	87.94	3,076	81.44
Turks	344	7.57	376	9.95
Serbs	132	2.9	130	3.44
Roma	16	0.35	37	0.98
Albanians	23	0.51	14	0.37
Vlachs			2	0.05
Bosniaks	1	0.02	1	0.03
Other / Undeclared / Unknown	32	0.71	26	0.7
Persons for whom data are taken from administrative sources			115	3.04

Populated settlements include:

- Demir Kapija (seat)
- Barovo
- Besvica
- Bistrenci
- Čelevec
- Čiflik
- Dračevica
- Dren
- Iberli
- Klisura
- Košarka
- Koprišnica
- Korešnica
- Prždevo
- Strmaševo
