= Dren, Demir Kapija =

Dren Дрен
- Village
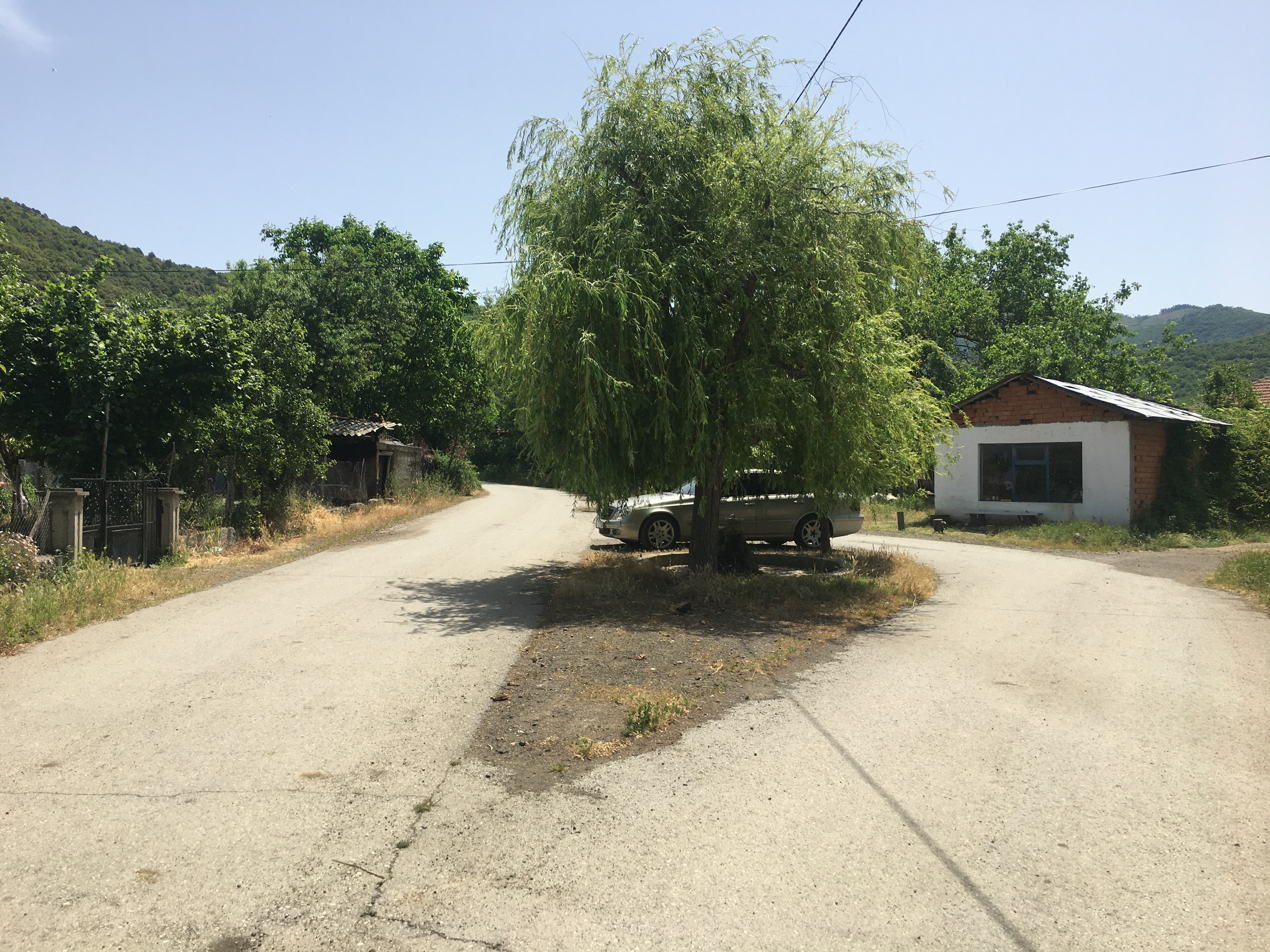
- Center of the village

- Location within North Macedonia
- Country: North Macedonia
- Region: Vardar
- Municipality: Demir Kapija

Population (2002)
  - Total: 94
- Time zone: UTC+1 (CET)
  - Summer (DST): UTC+2 (CEST)
- Website: .

Dren (Macedonian: Дрен) is a small village in the municipality of Demir Kapija in North Macedonia. It should not be confused with Dren, Prilep. It is located in the western part of the Municipality near the Došnica River power plant facility. The village operates a fish hatchery and a modern egg farm.

The holiday of the Patron Saint - St. Ilija (Ilinden), coined Panagjur, is very popular where many people gather in the village to visit its inhabitants and celebrate on the 2nd of August.

== Demographics ==
According to the 2002 census, the village had a total of 94 inhabitants. Ethnic groups in the village include:

- Macedonians 94

== Notes ==
Demir Kapija: From Prehistory to Today ISBN 9989-712-65-4, P 97-8

== See also ==
- Demir Kapija municipality
