= Čelevec, North Macedonia =

Čelevec Челевец
- Village
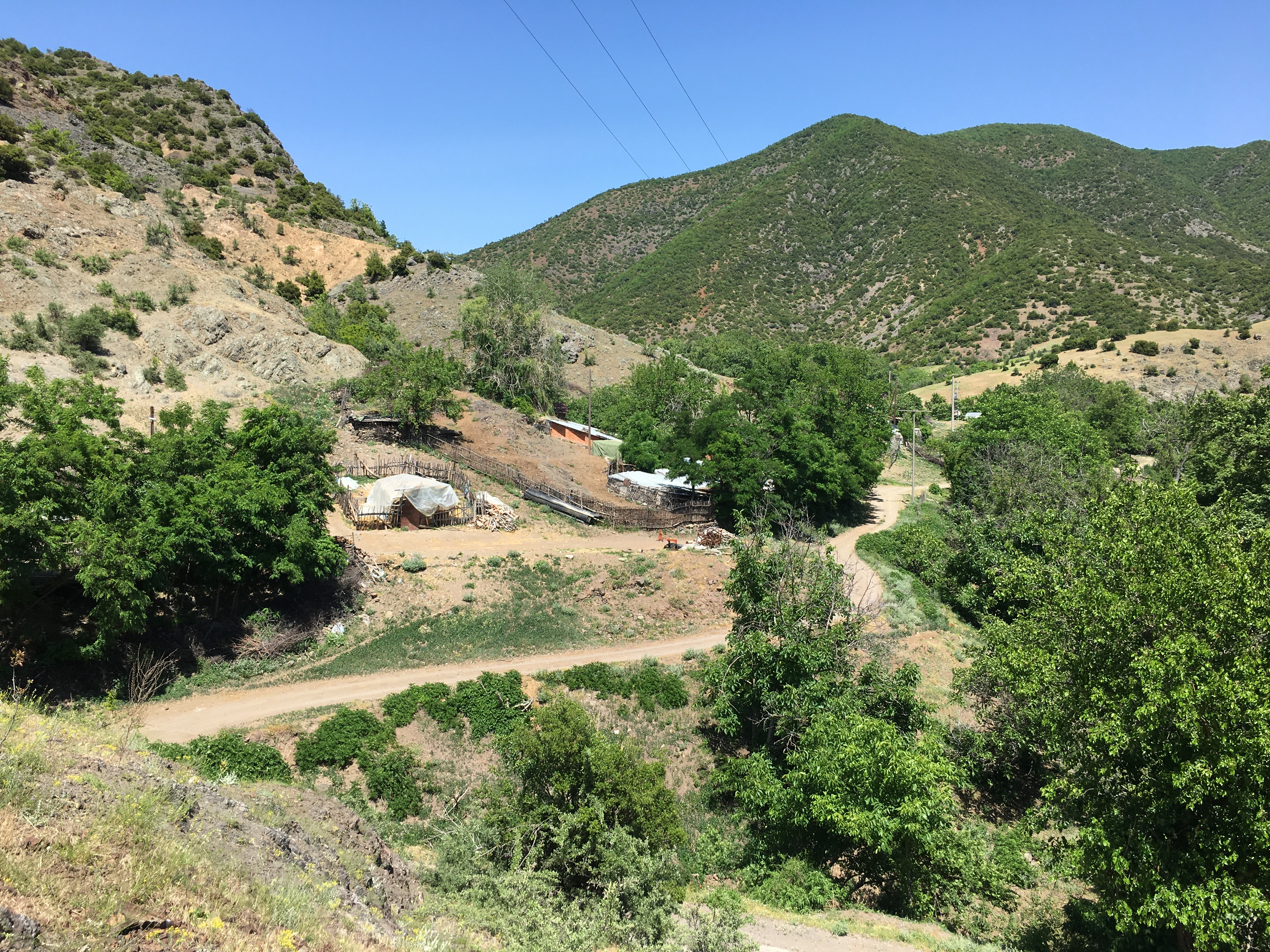
- View of the village

- Location within North Macedonia
- Coordinates: 41°25′N 22°17′E
- Country: North Macedonia
- Region: Vardar
- Municipality: Demir Kapija

Population (2021)
  - Total: 43
- Time zone: UTC+1 (CET)
  - Summer (DST): UTC+2 (CEST)
- Car plates: DK
- Climate: Cfa

Čelevec (Macedonian: Челевец) is a small village in the western area of the Demir Kapija Municipality of North Macedonia. The population is majority ethnically Turkish. The village is located in a wooded area between mountains; the village is accessed, either by a hillside path from Gevgelija, or a road from the village of Korešnica.

== Demographics ==
As of the 2021 census, Čelevec had 43 residents with the following ethnic composition:

- Turks: 38
- Persons for whom data are taken from administrative sources: 4
- Albanians: 1

According to the 2002 census, the village had a total of 52 inhabitants. Ethnic groups in the village include:

- Turks: 52

== Notes ==
- Demir Kapija: From Prehistory to Today ISBN 9989-712-65-4, p 96
