= Klisura, North Macedonia =

Klisura Клисура
- Village
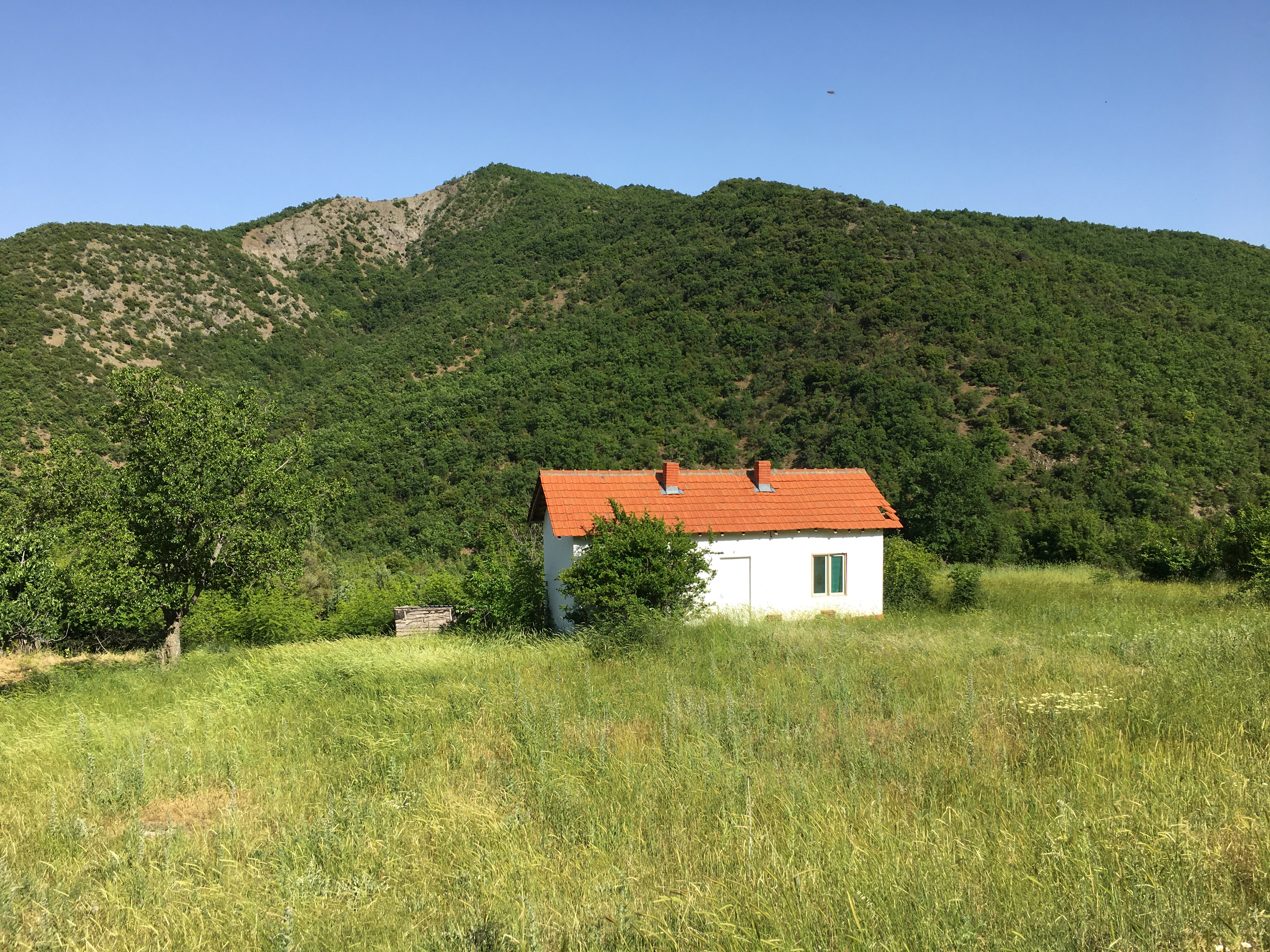
- House in the village

- Location within North Macedonia
- Country: North Macedonia
- Region: Vardar
- Municipality: Demir Kapija

Population (2002)
  - Total: 3
- Time zone: UTC+1 (CET)
  - Summer (DST): UTC+2 (CEST)
- Car plates: DK
- Climate: Cfa

Klisura (Macedonian: Клисура) is the oldest village in Demir Kapija Municipality in North Macedonia. It was along the Vardar River but moved into the mountains to be away from the main road in the mid 19th century. Many current Demir Kapija residents came to develop the town and municipality during socialism, one of Tito's plans for the modernization and industrialization of his Yugoslavia. Klisura was at its highest population of over 600 residents just after World War I. A large church and monastery were built there before then. Today, the village is nearly abandoned, but it has a unique tradition around Easter. Former inhabitants return to the village on Good Friday for a village reunion. On May 23, many people come to celebrate the patron Saint Nicholas. Several residents still herd goats, sheep, and other livestock.

== Demographics ==
According to the 2002 census, the village had a total of 3 inhabitants. Ethnic groups in the village include:

- Macedonians 3

== Sources ==
- Demir Kapija: From Prehistory to Today ISBN 9989-712-65-4, P 97-8
