= Dren, Prilep =

Dren Дрен
- Village
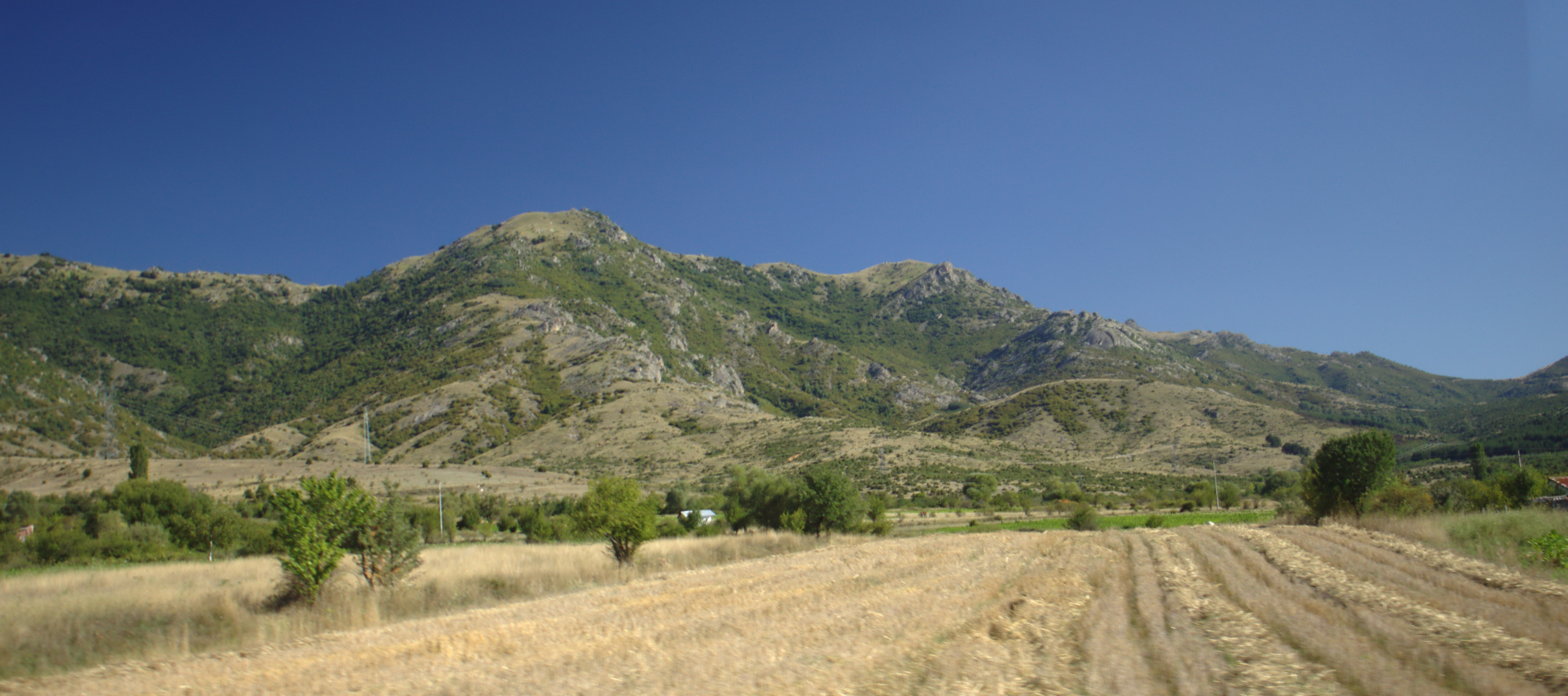

- Location within North Macedonia
- Country: North Macedonia
- Region: Pelagonia
- Municipality: Prilep
- Elevation: 616 m (2,021 ft)

Population (2021)
  - Total: 10
- Time zone: UTC+1 (CET)
- Postal code: 7500
- Area code: +38948

Dren (Macedonian: Дрен) is a village in Municipality of Prilep.

== Demographics ==
As of the 2021 census, Dren had 10 residents with the following ethnic composition:

- Macedonians 9
- Persons for whom data are taken from administrative sources 1

According to the 2002 census, the village had a total of 10 inhabitants. Ethnic groups in the village include:

- Macedonians 10
