= Konopište, North Macedonia =

Konopište Конопиште
- Village
- Location within North Macedonia
- Country: North Macedonia
- Region: Vardar
- Municipality: Kavadarci

Population (2002)
  - Total: 55
- Time zone: UTC+1 (CET)
  - Summer (DST): UTC+2 (CEST)
- Website: .

Konopište is a village in the Municipality of Kavadarci, situated in the center of the vinegary region of Tikveš, North Macedonia. Until 2004, it was the seat of Konopište Municipality.

== Demographics ==
According to the statistics of the Bulgarian ethnographer Vasil Kanchov from 1900 the settlement is recorded as Konopišta (Конопища) and as having 742 inhabitants, 710 being Christian Bulgarians, 18 Christian Albanians and 14 Romani. In the 1905 Austrian ethnographic map of the region of Macedonia, Konopište appears as being inhabited by an Exarchist Orthodox Macedonian Slavic majority and an Orthodox Christian Albanian minority. According to the 2002 census, the village had a total of 55 inhabitants. Ethnic groups in the village include:

- Macedonians 55
