= Kavadarci Municipality =

Municipality of North Macedonia

Coordinates: 41°26′24″N 22°00′36″E

Kavadarci Municipality Општина Кавадарци
- Municipality
- Flag Coat of arms

- Country: North Macedonia
- Region: Vardar
- Municipal seat: Kavadarci

Government
  - Mayor: Mitko Janchev (VMRO-DPMNE)

Area
  - Total: 1,132 km^{2} (437 sq mi)

Population
  - Total: 35,733
- Time zone: UTC+1 (CET)
- Vehicle registration: KA

Kavadarci (Macedonian: Кавадарци [kaˈvadartsi]) is a municipality in the southern part of North Macedonia. Kavadarci is also the name of the town where the municipal seat is found. Kavadarci Municipality is part of the Vardar Statistical Region.

== Geography ==
The municipality borders Prilep Municipality to the west, Čaška Municipality and Rosoman Municipality to the north, Negotino Municipality to the northeast, Demir Kapija Municipality and Gevgelija Municipality to the east, and Greece to the south.

== Demographics ==
According to the 2021 North Macedonia census, this municipality has 35,733 inhabitants. Ethnic groups in the municipality include:

| | 2002 | | 2021 | |
| | Number | % | Number | % |
| TOTAL | 38,741 | 100 | 35,733 | 100 |
| Macedonians | 37,499 | 96.79 | 32,012 | 89.59 |
| Roma | 679 | 1.75 | 729 | 2.04 |
| Turks | 167 | 0.43 | 134 | 0.38 |
| Serbs | 218 | 0.56 | 125 | 0.35 |
| Albanians | 2 | 0.005 | 30 | 0.08 |
| Vlachs | 27 | 0.07 | 29 | 0.08 |
| Bosniaks | 4 | 0.01 | 9 | 0.03 |
| Other / Undeclared / Unknown | 145 | 0.385 | 237 | 0.66 |
| Persons for whom data are taken from administrative sources | | | 2,428 | 6.79 |
