= Demir Kapija =

Demir Kapija Демир Капија (Macedonian)
- Town
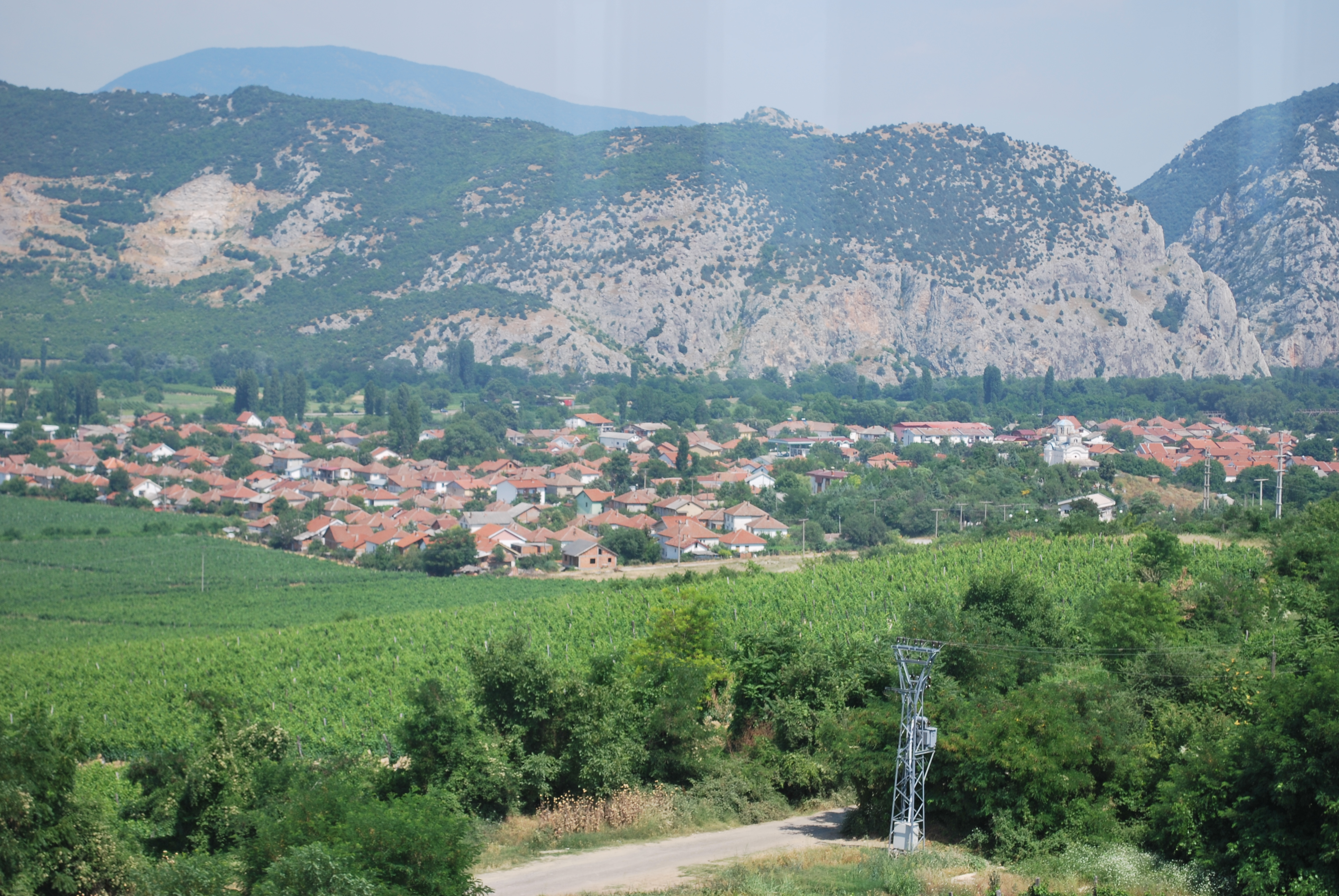

- Flag Seal

- Location within North Macedonia
- Coordinates: 41°24′41″N 22°14′32″E
- Country: North Macedonia
- Region: Vardar
- Municipality: Demir Kapija

Government
  - Mayor: Natalija Dimitrieva (VMRO-DPMNE)

Population (2002)
  - Total: 3,275
- Time zone: UTC+1 (CET)
  - Summer (DST): UTC+2 (CEST)
- Area code: +389
- Vehicle registration: DK
- Climate: Cfa
- Website: www.opstinademirkapija.gov.mk

Demir Kapija (Macedonian: Демир Капија [ˌdɛmir ˈkapija]) is a small town in North Macedonia, located near the limestone gates of the same name. It has 3,725 inhabitants. The town is the seat of Demir Kapija Municipality.

== Etymology ==
The name of the town comes from Ottoman Turkish Demir Kapi (Iron Gate) when the settlement was part of the Ottoman Empire, and is still called Demir Kapı in Turkish.

== History ==
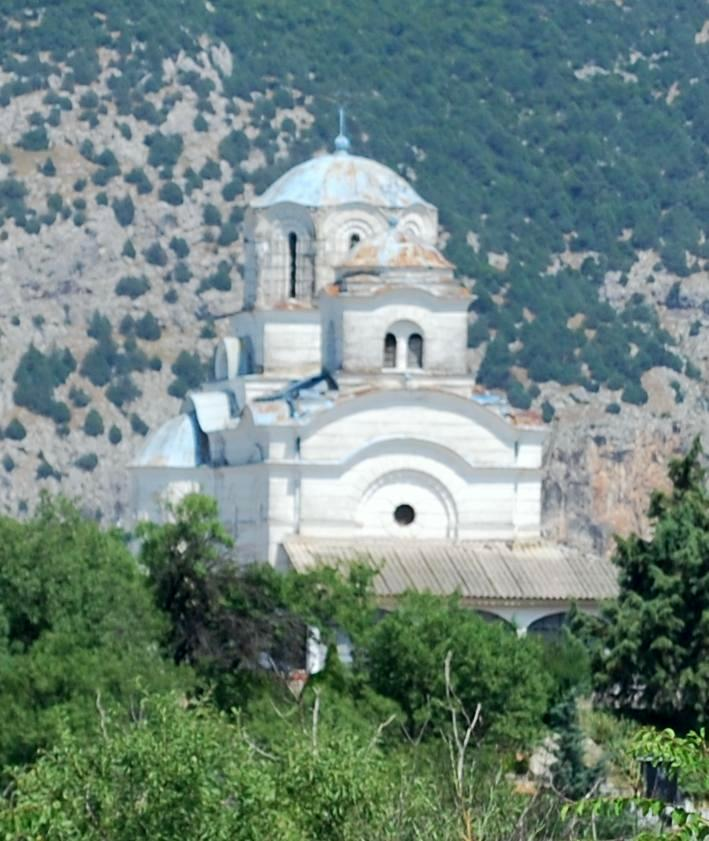
Dormition of the Theotokos Church in Demir Kapija

Demir-Kapija was already mentioned in Classical times under the name of Stenae (Στεναί, "gorge" in Greek). In the earlier dates to the Paeonian era, a fortress was built on the mountain Ramniste, on the foothills of the Demir Kapija settlement and it is still there. The ruins are one of only 3 known Paeonian structures in Macedonia, and date from 3000 years ago. In the Middle Ages Demir Kapija was a Slav settlement, under the name of Prosek, while today's name originates from Turkish, meaning "The Iron Gate".

The town of Prosek was used as a fortress due to its good strategic position; history and artifacts suggest this fortress was built in the era of the Macedonian dynasty around 450 BC as a lookout to the canyon beyond for troop movements to the north. In the thirteenth century AD, Prosek had become the seat of Dobromir Hriz, and Strez was its well-known commander.

The former settlement was fortified by walls, and it was used to exist in the Neolithic Age. Demir Kapija harbours ancient remains from many eras: the Paeonian, Ancient Macedonian, Roman, Byzantine, the period of Samuil, the Ottoman as well as the early Christian period.

== Demir Kapija Today ==
Demir Kapija is a venue for sports and recreational activities. Mountaineers hike in the area to collect tea plants. Formerly, national and regional Kayak competitions were held here because of the nearby river rapids. There are also trails to hike to these points and to the ruins of the fortress Prosek.

Demir Kapija is also home to the largest mental health institute in the state, The Specijalen Zavod. The Special Olympics team from this institute is well noted in football and track and field events.

The former Yugoslav King Aleksandar Karadjordjevic had his summer home and winery built here. The winery is the oldest on the Balkans and still produces quality wines under the privately owned Agropin name. Newer wineries, like Popova Kula, have opened up additionally and paves the way for exports and economic stimulus of the region. Demir Kapija is also home to the flour mill Dekamel and has a modern farm for production of eggs known as Salmak.

== Geography ==
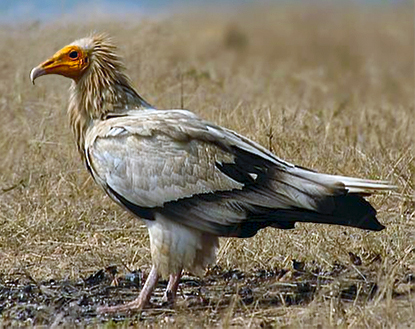
Egyptian vultures nest in the IBA

The Vardar river moves through a gorge close to Demir Kapija, while the "Bela Voda" cave is 955m long. When passing "The Iron Gates", the road leads to the Valandovo and Gevgelija valley. This valley has a humid subtropical climate. The highest temperature ever in North Macedonia 45.7 °C (114.3 °F) was recorded here on 24 July 2007. It is the most varied region in Macedonia with its agricultural products.

=== Important Bird Area ===
Demir Kapija is also a national monument of nature and an ornithological reserve, home to many rare species of birds and endemic plants. A 10,500 ha site, encompassing the Vardar gorge, Celevecka river and Krastavec ridge, has been recognised as the Demir Kapija Gorge Important Bird Area (IBA) by BirdLife International because it supports populations of rock partridges, Egyptian vultures, short-toed snake-eagles, Levant sparrowhawks, eastern subalpine warblers, western rock nuthatches, eastern black-eared wheatears and black-headed buntings.

== Demographics ==
According to the 2002 census, the town had a total of 3,275 residents. Ethnic groups in the village include:

	Number	%
TOTAL	3,275	100
Macedonians	3,161	96.52
others	114	3.06

== Transport ==
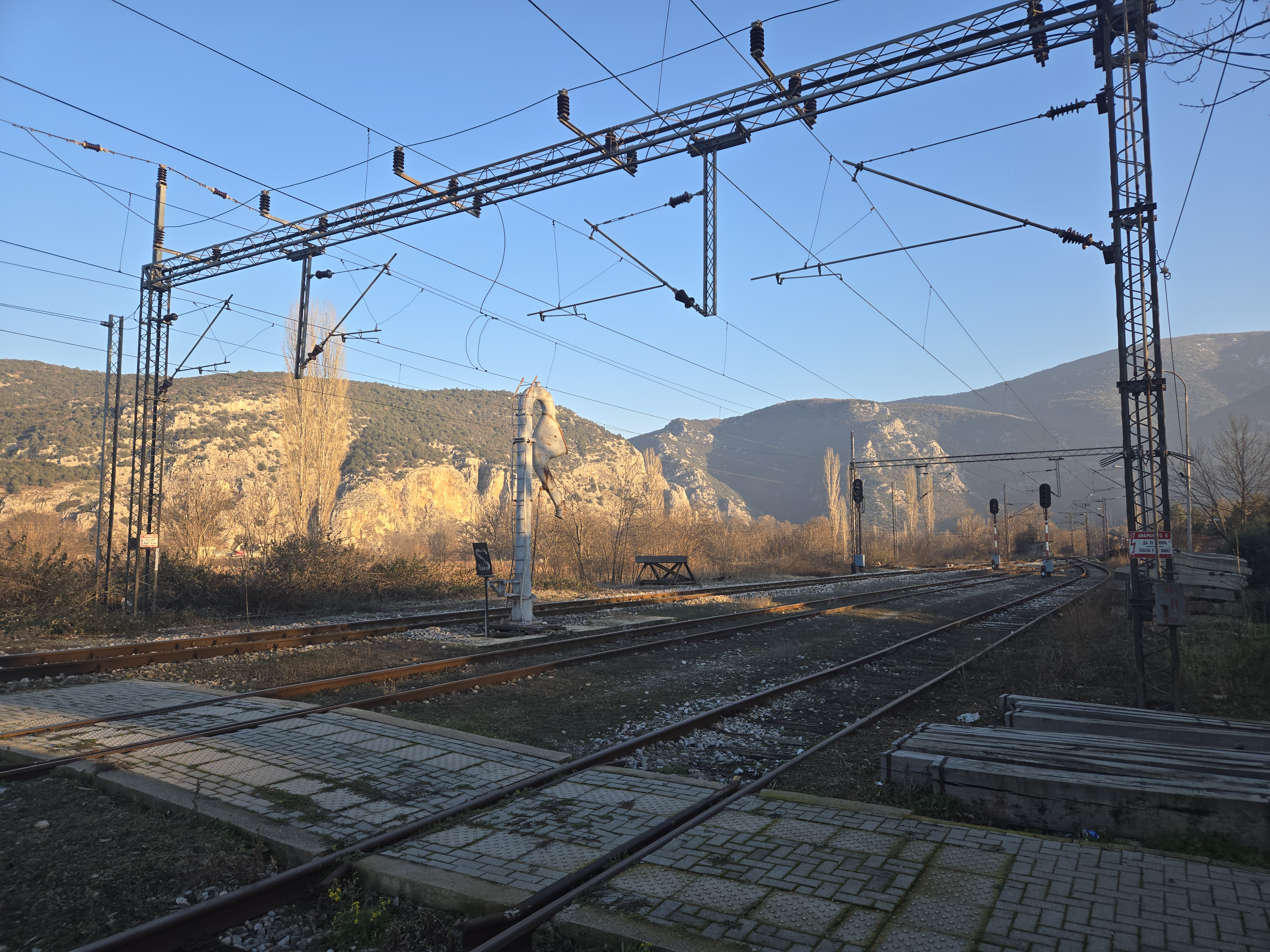
Railway Tracks in Demir Kapija

The town is served by the Demir Kapija railway station, with connections from Niš in Serbia to the port of Thessaloniki in Greece on the Aegean Sea (Corridor X), with Intercity services to Skopje and Thessaloniki in Greece.

== Sports ==
Local football club FK Lozar was merged in 2006 with FK Vardar Negotino.
