= Sogle =

Sogle Согле Soglë
- Village
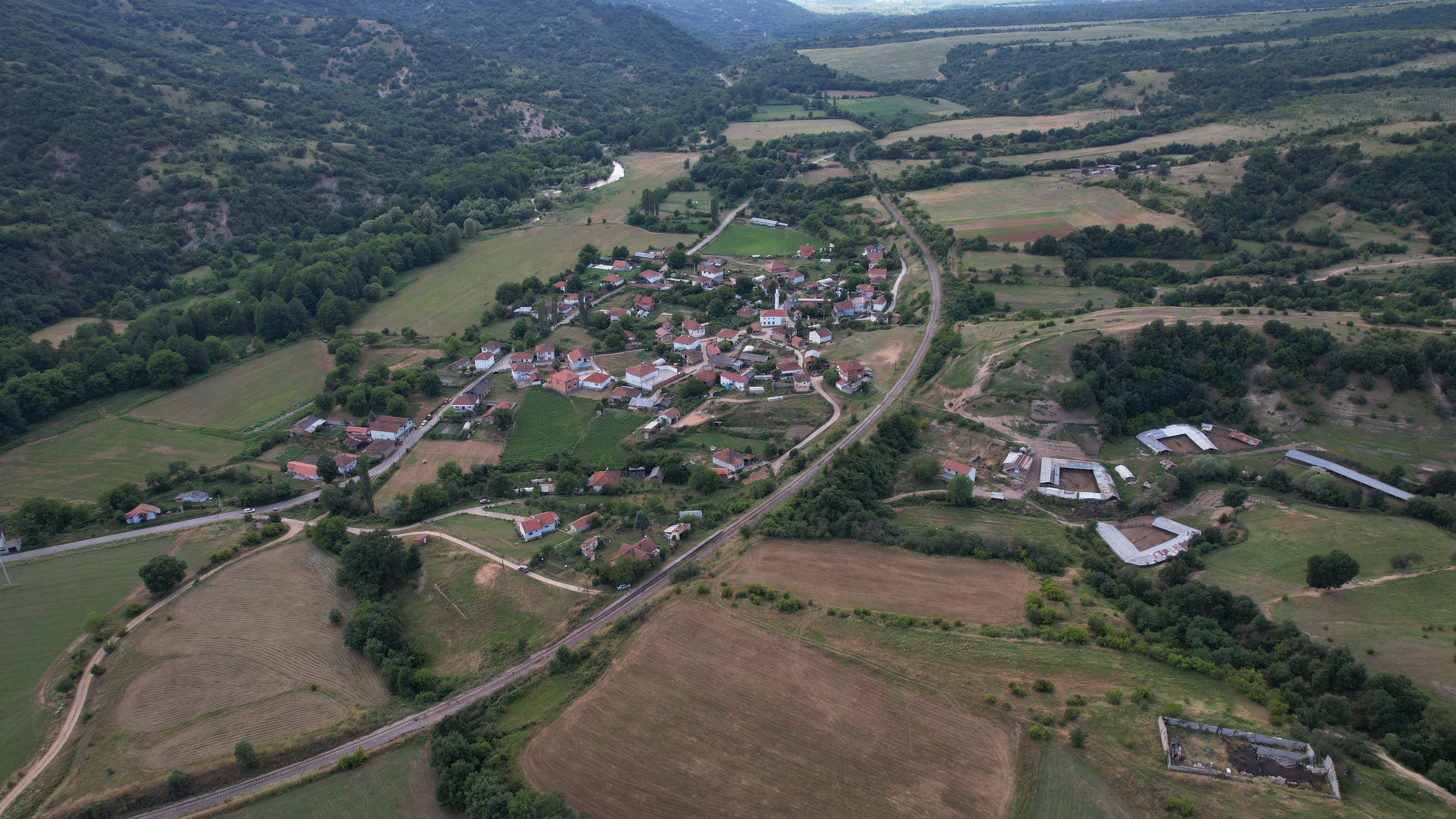
- Air view of the village

- Location within North Macedonia
- Coordinates: 41°35′N 21°33′E
- Country: North Macedonia
- Region: Vardar
- Municipality: Čaška

Population (2021)
  - Total: 116
- Time zone: UTC+1 (CET)
  - Summer (DST): UTC+2 (CEST)
- Car plates: VE
- Website: .

Sogle (Macedonian: Согле, Albanian: Soglë) is a village in the municipality of Čaška, North Macedonia.

== Demographics ==
On the 1927 ethnic map of Leonhard Schulze-Jena, Sogle is shown as an Albanian village.

The village of Sogle has historically been inhabited by a Torbeš population and Muslim Albanians. In the early 1960s the Torbeš population consisted of 7 families and 11 households, while Muslim Albanians were 13 families and 24 households. Due to the migration of some of the Muslim population from the village, Orthodox Macedonians from the villages of Nežilovo, Papradište, Kapinovo, Oreše, Bogomila and other settlements of the Azot region have settled in their place in Sogle. Muslim Albanians though traditionally have been a smaller population in Sogle, they have influenced the process of Torbeš in the village assimilating as Albanians. Village relations between Albanians of Sogle with those of Gorno Jabolčište and Dolno Jabolčište are absent and instead are close with the villages of Desovo and Crnilište with whom they practice marriage endogamy.

According to the 2021 census, the village had a total of 116 inhabitants. Ethnic groups in the village include:

- Macedonians 70
- Albanians 41
- Others 5

Year	Macedonian	Albanian	Turks	Romani	Vlachs	Serbs	Bosniaks	Others	Total
2002	88	43	3	...	...	2	...	...	137
2021	70	41	...	...	...	...	...	5	116
