= Petar Poparsov =

Bulgarian educator and revolutionary

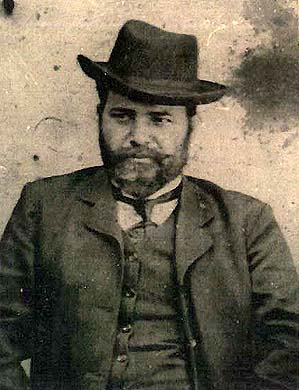
- Portrait of Poparsov
- Born: 14 August 1868; Bogomila, Ottoman Empire
- Died: 1 January 1941 (aged 72); Sofia, Kingdom of Bulgaria
- Education: Sofia University
- Occupations: Teacher, politician
- Employer: Bulgarian Men's High School of Thessaloniki
- Organization(s): Young Macedonian Literary Society; Internal Macedonian Revolutionary Organization

Petar Poparsov (Bulgarian: Петър Попарсов; Macedonian: Петар Попарсов) or Petar Pop Arsov (Note: His last name is rendered 'Poparsov' and 'Pop Arsov'. In the older Bulgarian orthography, his name was spelled as Петъръ попъ Арсовъ. Also known in the Serbian historiography as Petar Pop Arsić (Serbian: Петар Поп Арсић).) (Macedonian: Петар Поп Арсов; 14 August 1868 – 1 January 1941) was a Macedonian Bulgarian revolutionary, teacher and one of the founders of the Internal Macedonian Revolutionary Organization (IMRO). He was also a founder of the Young Macedonian Literary Society.

== Early life ==
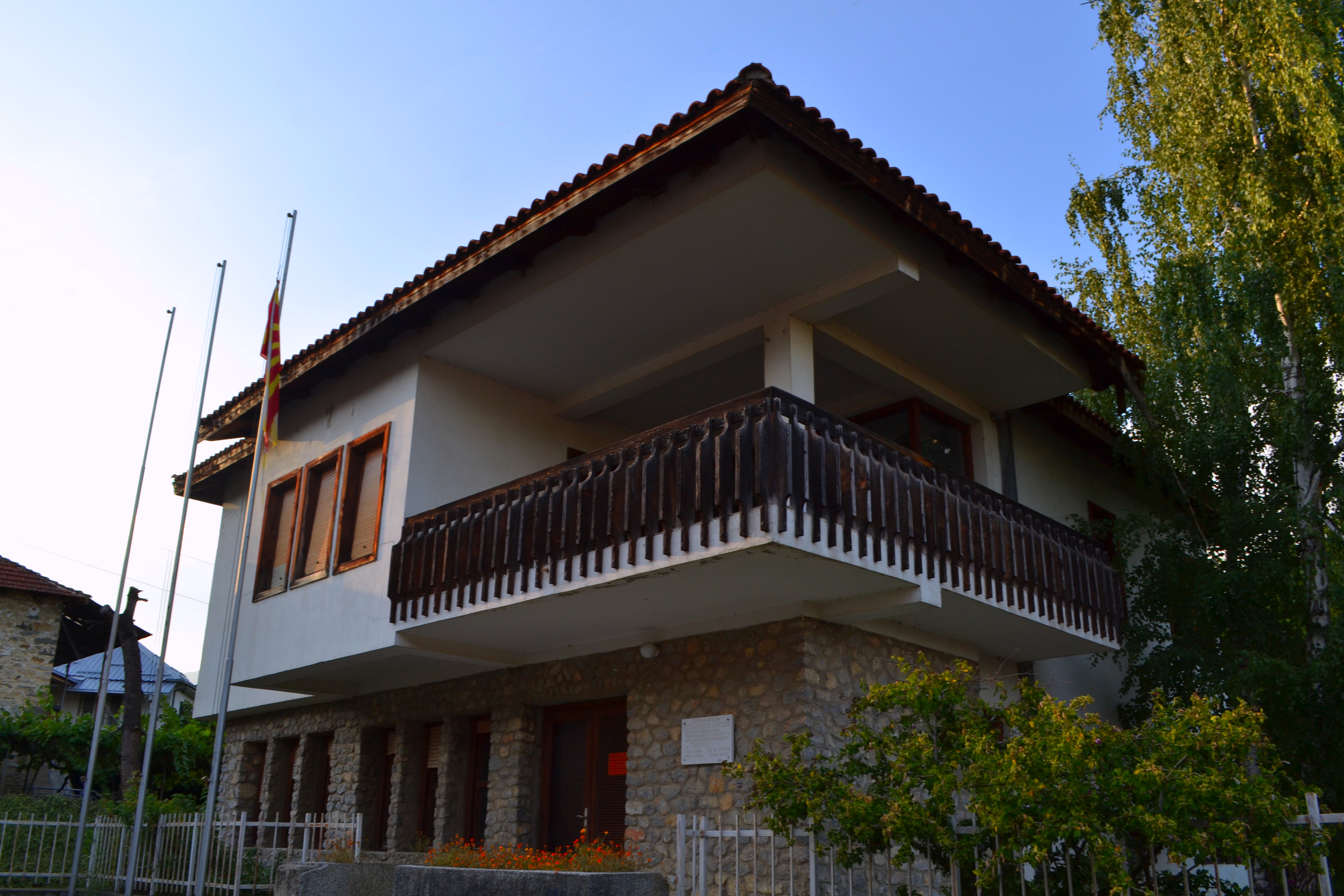
Pop Arsov's birth house now turned into a memorial house.

He was born in 1868 in the village of Bogomila in the region Azot, near Veles. Poparsov had his primary education in the village from 1877/1878 to 1880/1881. After completing his primary education, he enrolled into a gymnasium in Veles in 1881/1882. In 1882/1883, the Bulgarian Exarchate managed to establish control over all schools in Veles. In 1883/1884, Poparsov completed his education in the gymnasium. He enrolled into the Bulgarian Men's High School of Thessaloniki in 1884/1885. Poparsov met Dame Gruev there, establishing a student club with him. He was one of the leaders of the student's revolt in the gymnasium. As a consequence, he was expelled along with 38 other students. Then they accepted the offer to study at the expense of the Serbian society "St. Sava" in Belgrade.

He managed to enroll in the philology studies program at Belgrade University in 1888. The students were not happy that they had to learn Serbian. Poparsov spoke out against Serbian propaganda and convinced his compatriots that they were not Serbs. He and other students translated Lazar Komarčić's novel Heartless People from Serbian to Bulgarian. In December 1889, he was one of the main organizers of unrests in the students' boarding house. As a result, he was expelled from the faculty along with two other organizers. He and other students moved to Sofia in 1890 to continue their education. In 1891, he was one of the founders of the Young Macedonian Literary Society in Sofia and its magazine Loza (The Vine). He edited Loza under the pseudonym Vardarski. On 8 July 1892, he graduated in Slavistics from the philological faculty in Sofia University. In 1892/1893, after returning to Macedonia, he became a professor in Skopje. In 1893/1894, he became a professor in the gymnasium in Thessaloniki.

== IMRO ==
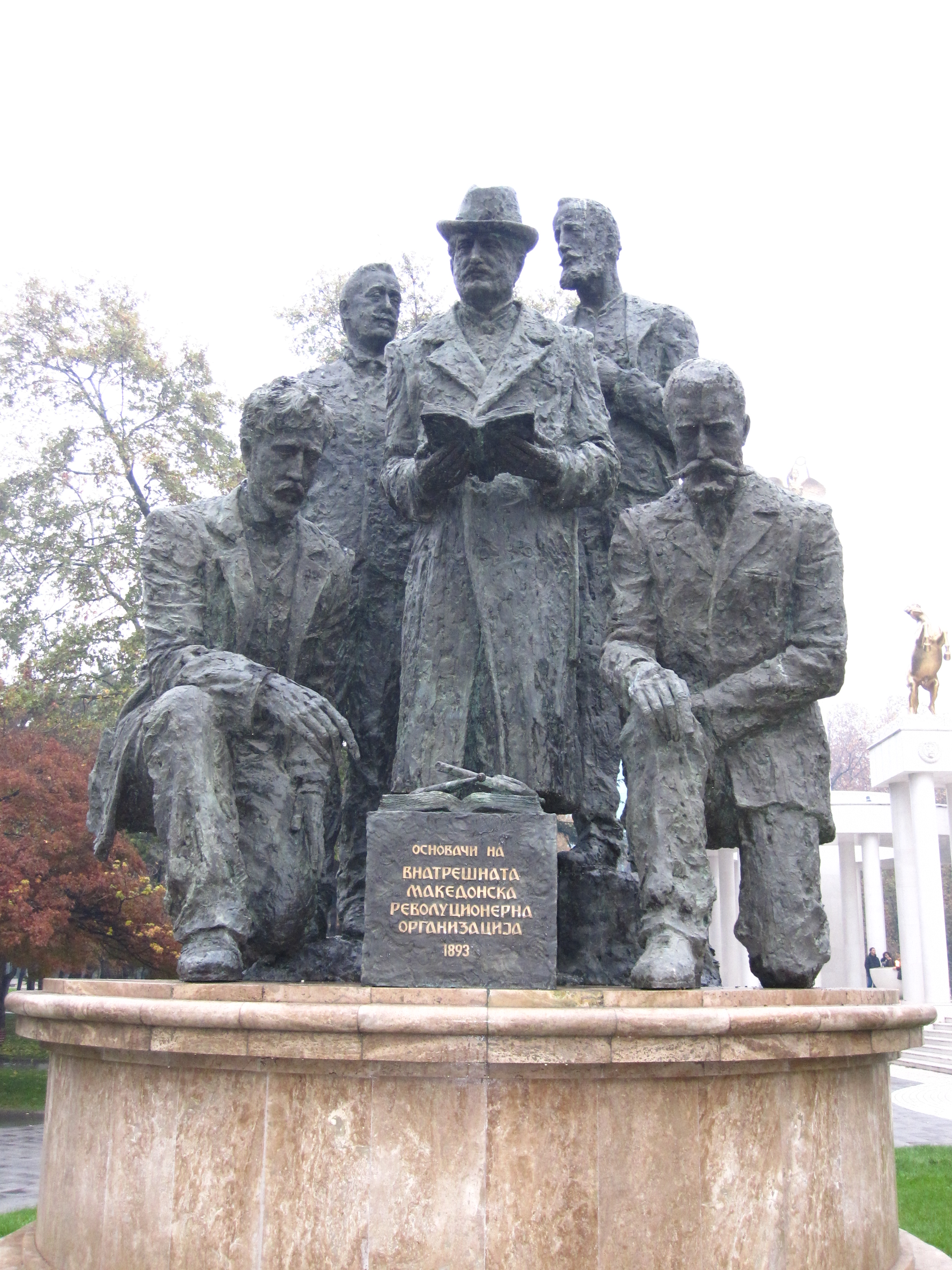
Poparsov's statue in the middle as part of the founders of IMRO monument in Skopje

He was a founder of the Internal Macedonian Revolutionary Organization (IMRO) on 23 October 1893. Per him, the organization was then named "Committee for Obtaining the Political Rights Given to Macedonia by the Congress of Berlin". According to Poparsov, the "brutal policy of Serbianization, which denied all human dignity in the Macedonian Bulgarians" was the main reason for its creation. In January 1894, Poparsov was tasked by the Organization to prepare a draft for the first statute of the IMRO, based on the statute of Vasil Levski's Internal Revolutionary Organization, which was available to them in Zahari Stoyanov's Notes on the Bulgarian Uprisings. Some international, Macedonian and Bulgarian researchers have assumed that in this first statute the organization was called Bulgarian Macedonian-Adrianople Revolutionary Committees, and Poparsov was its author. The membership in the organization was initially allowed only for Bulgarians. In the same year, on behalf of the Organization, Poparsov made a brochure called "The Stambolovist Movement in Macedonia and Its Representatives", which was printed by Ivan Hadzhinikolov in Sofia and brought to Thessaloniki, spread around Macedonia. To avoid the author's persecution, it was published under the pseudonym Vardarski and the place of publication was marked as Vienna. In the brochure, he sharply criticized the "authoritarian" and "corrupted" course of action of the Bulgarian Exarchate in the region. He accused the Exarchate of dictatorially suppressing the "liberties" of the local population. Poparsov generally used the terms "Bulgaro-Macedonians" and "Macedonian Bulgarians" for his compatriots in the brochure.

In 1895/1896, he became the director of Prilep's Exarchate schools and the president of IMRO's committee in the city. In 1896/1897, he worked in Štip as a Bulgarian teacher - director and president of the IMRO's committee in the city. In 1897, as a result of the Vinitsa affair, he was arrested by the Ottoman authorities and tortured. He was charged with organizing a rebellion and as a member of a revolutionary committee based on the letters by Mishe Razvigorov, which the Ottoman authorities found, where Poparsov's name was mentioned. He was sentenced to 101 years in prison by the military court and sent to the Podrum Kale prison in 1898. He was pardoned on 19 August 1902 by Abdul Hamid II. During the wave of arrests that followed the Thessaloniki bombings of 1903, Poparsov was arrested in Veles and taken to Skopje prison, but freed in August 1903. For this reason he did not actively participate in the Ilinden-Preobrazhenie Uprising in 1903. In 1904, he became a member of IMRO's Central Committee. Due to the Ottoman crackdown on revolutionaries, he was unable to continue teaching in Macedonia and went to Bulgaria. At the Rila Congress of IMRO in November 1905, he was admitted to the Organization's Foreign Representation in Sofia. According to political scientist Alexis Heraclides, Poparsov was part of the leftist federalist faction of the revolutionary organization, favoring political autonomy of Macedonia and strongly opposed to the right-wing centralist faction which favored unification with Bulgaria. In 1907, after the assassination of Boris Sarafov and Ivan Garvanov, he was arrested in connection with the double murder by the Bulgarian police, but was released due to lack of evidence in February 1908. After the Young Turk Revolution of 1908, he took an active part in the preparation and holding of the elections for the Ottoman Parliament with the list of the People's Federative Party (Bulgarian Section) but did not receive the necessary number of votes for a deputy. In 1912, he participated as a candidate of the opposition in the elections in the Skopje sanjak, which were won by the Young Turks. Despite gaining the most votes in the opposition, he again did not manage to become a deputy. During the First Balkan War he participated in an unsuccessful meeting attended by some local revolutionaries from the IMARO in Veles. It was organized by Dimitrija Čupovski and its aim was to authorize representatives to participate in the London Peace Conference, with the goal of preserving the integrity of the region of Macedonia.

== In Bulgaria ==
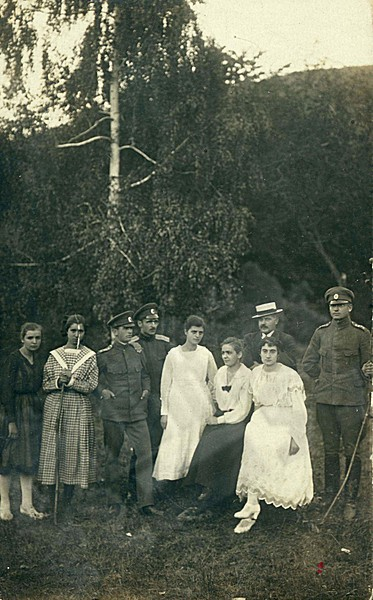
Poparsov with his former students on an excursion near Kostenets during 1921

After the Second Balkan War, he was persecuted by the Serbian authorities and moved with his wife Hrisanta Nasteva, a teacher of the Bulgarian Girls' High School of Thessaloniki, to Bulgaria. They settled in Kostenets in 1914, where he continuously taught from 1914 to 1930. He worked not only as a teacher but also as a director until his retirement. There Poparsov participated in the activities of the so-called Temporary representation of the former IMRO. In 1920, he protested against the Serbianization of Macedonian Bulgarians implemented in the Kingdom of Serbs, Croats and Slovenes. After his retirement, he moved to Sofia in 1930, where he lived with his wife. His nephew and the widow of his brother also started living with them. He died after a brief illness in his home in Sofia on 1 January 1941.

=== Relatives and legacy ===
His brother Andrey Poparsov was also an IMRO activist and a Bulgarian teacher in the villages of Bogomila and Oreše. Andrey became a mayor of Bogomila during the Bulgarian occupation of Serbia in the First World War. He was killed in October 1918 by the Serbian authorities as a Bulgarian collaborator.

His birthplace in Bogomila became a memorial house and contains ethnological items from the region Azot, which had to be renovated in the 2010s and 2020s by Čaška Municipality. He is regarded as an ethnic Macedonian by the historiography in North Macedonia.
