= Gorno Vranovci =

Gorno Vranovci Горно Врановци Vranoc i Epërm
- Village
- Location within North Macedonia
- Coordinates: 41°41′N 21°33′E
- Country: North Macedonia
- Region: Vardar
- Municipality: Čaška

Population (2021)
  - Total: 318
- Time zone: UTC+1 (CET)
  - Summer (DST): UTC+2 (CEST)
- Car plates: VE
- Website: .

Gorno Vranovci (Macedonian: Горно Врановци, Albanian: Vranoc i Epërm) is a village in the municipality of Čaška, North Macedonia. The village has an Albanian school and a mosque.

== History ==
The village was traditionally inhabited by a Torbeš population. Their ancestors were Mijaks who converted to Islam during the 16th century and migrated from the Mala Reka region in the Debar area at the end of the 17th until the 19th centuries to central Macedonia establishing villages such as Gorno Vranovci. Gorno Vranovci was the location where the first Macedonian newspaper Nova Makedonija (New Macedonia) was initially published during 1944. Between 1950-1960 the inhabitants of Gorno Vranovci immigrated to Turkey, in particular the city of İzmir with a few other families going to Bursa, Ankara and Edirne. Gorno Vranovci was repopulated with Albanians from the neighbouring villages of Gorno Jabolčište and Dolno Jabolčište alongside Albanians from Kosovo who were escaping oppression and violence. Albanians from Gorno Vranovci have also migrated to Turkey, mainly to Istanbul.

== Demographics ==
In statistics gathered by Vasil Kanchov in 1900, the village of Gorno Vranovci was inhabited by 1900 Muslim Bulgarians. On the 1927 ethnic map of Leonhard Schulze-Jena, the village is shown as Muslim Bulgarian village. The Yugoslav census of 1948 recorded 3354 people of whom 3247 were Macedonians, 102 Turks, 1 Albanian and 4 others. The Yugoslav census of 1953 recorded 3847 people of whom 3780 were Turks, 47 Macedonians, 2 Albanians and 18 others. The 1961 Yugoslav census recorded 738 people of whom 524 were Turks, 209 Albanians, 2 Macedonians and 3 others. In the 1960s the Muslim Macedonian population of Gorno Vranovci consisted of 37 families and 60 households, while Muslim Albanians were 38 households. The 1971 census recorded 177 people of whom 146 were Albanians, 28 Turks, 1 Macedonian and 2 others. The 1981 Yugoslav census recorded 184 people of whom 138 were Albanians, 39 Turks, 6 Bosniaks and 1 Macedonian. The Macedonian census of 1994 recorded 221 people of whom 207 were Albanians, 11 Turks, 1 Macedonian and 2 others.

According to the 2021 census, the village had a total of 318 inhabitants. Ethnic groups in the village include:

- Albanians 304
- Turks 5
- Macedonians 1
- Bosniaks 5

Year	Macedonian	Albanian	Turks	Romani	Vlachs	Serbs	Bosniaks	Others	Total
2002	1	189	9	...	...	...	...	...	199
2021	1	304	5	...	...	...	1	...	318
