= Vitanci =

Vitanci Витанци Vitanca
- Village
- Location within North Macedonia
- Coordinates: 41.6447°N 21.7214°E
- Country: North Macedonia
- Region: Vardar
- Municipality: Čaška

Population (2021)
  - Total: 0
- Time zone: UTC+1 (CET)
  - Summer (DST): UTC+2 (CEST)
- Website: .

Vitanci (Macedonian: Витанци, Albanian: Vitanca) is a village in the municipality of Čaška, North Macedonia. It used to be part of the former municipality of Bogomila.

== Demographics ==
The settlement last had inhabitants in the 1971 census, where it was recorded as being populated by 8 Albanians, 1 Macedonian and 1 "Other".

According to the 2002 census, the village had 0 inhabitants.
