= Omorani =

- Village
- Оморани
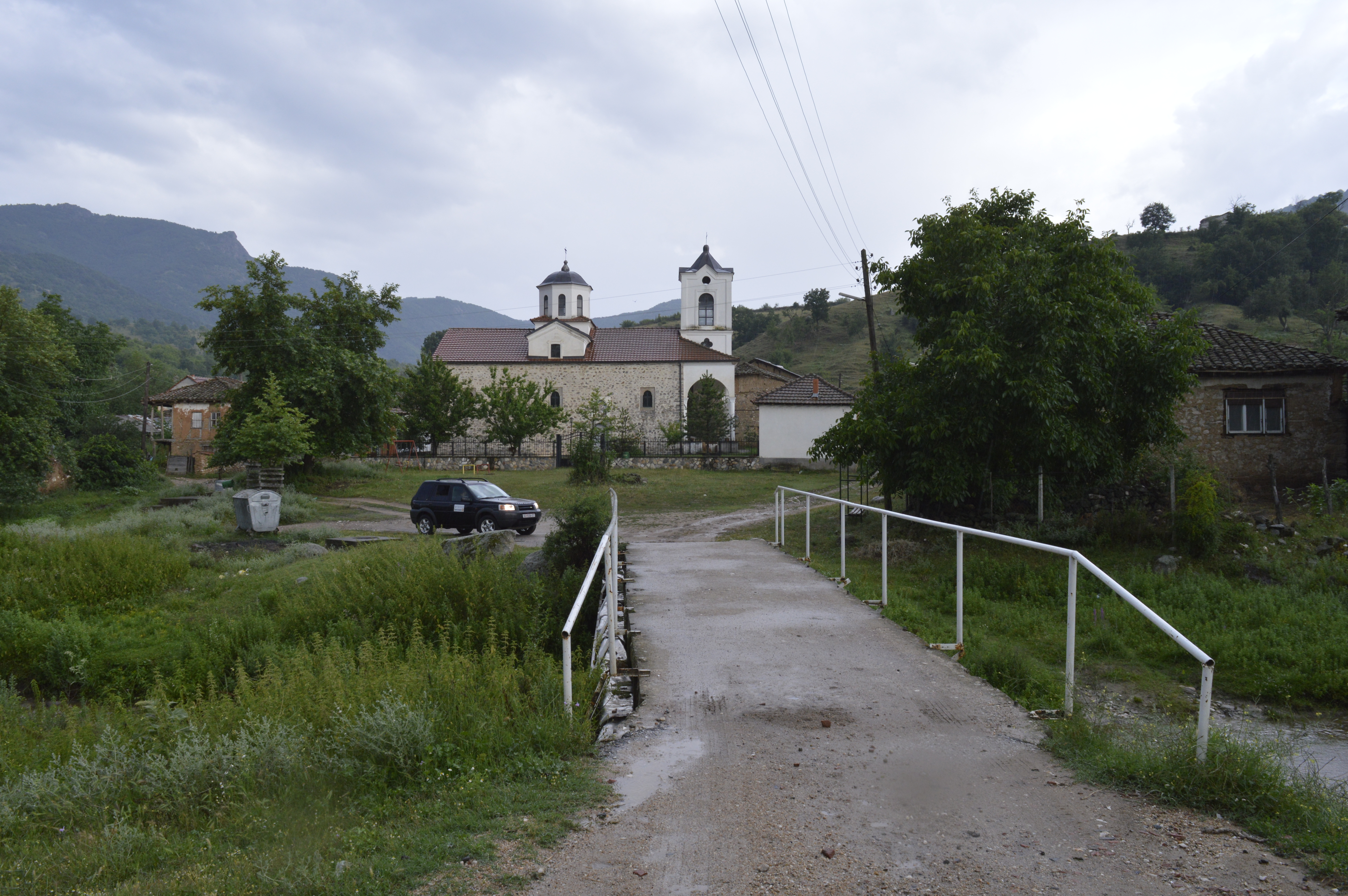
- View of the local church in the village

- Location within North Macedonia
- Coordinates: 41°32′03″N 21°36′32″E
- Country: North Macedonia
- Region: Vardar
- Municipality: Čaška

Population (2021)
  - Total: 172
- Time zone: UTC+1 (CET)
  - Summer (DST): UTC+2 (CEST)
- Car plates: VE
- Website: .

Omorani (Macedonian: Оморани) is a village in the municipality of Čaška, North Macedonia. It used to be part of the former municipality of Izvor.

== Demographics ==
Toward the end of the 19th and beginning of the 20th centuries, Omorani traditionally was a mixed Orthodox Macedonian, Torbeš and Muslim Albanian village. During the Balkan Wars (1912-1913) the Muslim population left the village and resettled in the village of Sogle.

According to the 2021 census, the village had a total of 152 inhabitants. Ethnic groups in the village include:

- Macedonians 167
- Others 5

Year	Macedonian	Albanian	Turks	Romani	Vlachs	Serbs	Bosniaks	Others	Total
2002	141	...	...	...	...	...	...	2	143
2021	167	...	...	...	...	...	...	5	172
