= Lisiče, Čaška =

Lisiče
- Village
- Лисиче
- Location within North Macedonia
- Coordinates: 41°40′32″N 21°36′30″E
- Country: North Macedonia
- Region: Vardar
- Municipality: Čaška

Population (2002)
  - Total: 128
- Time zone: UTC+1 (CET)
  - Summer (DST): UTC+2 (CEST)
- Car plates: VE
- Website: .

Lisiče (Macedonian: Лисиче) is a village in the municipality of Čaška, North Macedonia.

== Demographics ==
Toward the end of the 19th and beginning of the 20th centuries, Lisiče traditionally was a mixed Orthodox Macedonian, Torbeš and Muslim Albanian village. During the Balkan Wars (1912-1913) some of the Muslim population left the village and resettled in the villages of Gorno Jabolčište and Dolno Jabolčište. Torbešis from Lisiče left the village after the Second World War.

According to the 2021 census, the village had a total of 128 inhabitants. Ethnic groups in the village include:

- Macedonians 126
- Albanians 2

Year	Macedonian	Albanian	Turks	Romani	Vlachs	Serbs	Bosniaks	Others	Total
2002	159	...	...	...	...	...	...	...	159
2021	126	2	...	...	...	...	...	...	128
