= Bistrica, Čaška =

Bistrica Бистрица
- Village
- Location within North Macedonia
- Coordinates: 41.616448°N 21.516651°E
- Country: North Macedonia
- Region: Vardar
- Municipality: Čaška

Population (2021)
  - Total: 44
- Time zone: UTC+1 (CET)
  - Summer (DST): UTC+2 (CEST)
- Website: .

Bistrica (Macedonian: Бистрица) is a village in the municipality of Čaška, North Macedonia. It used to be part of the former municipality of Bogomila.

== Demographics ==
On the 1927 ethnic map of Leonhard Schulze-Jena, the village is shown as a Serbianized Bulgarian Christian village. According to the 2021 census, the village had a total of 44 inhabitants.

Year	Macedonian	Albanian	Turks	Romani	Vlachs	Serbs	Bosniaks	Others	Total
2002	121	...	...	...	...	2	...	2	119
2021	41	...	...	...	...	...	...	3	44
