= Mokreni, Čaška =

Mokreni Мокрени
- Village
- Location within North Macedonia
- Coordinates: 41°37′N 21°42′E
- Country: North Macedonia
- Region: Vardar
- Municipality: Čaška

Population (2021)
  - Total: 5
- Time zone: UTC+1 (CET)
  - Summer (DST): UTC+2 (CEST)
- Car plates: VE
- Website: .

Mokreni (Macedonian: Мокрени) is a village in the municipality of Čaška, North Macedonia.

== Demographics ==
On the 1927 ethnic map of Leonhard Schulze-Jena, the village is shown as a Serbianized Bulgarian Christian village. According to the 2021 census, the village had a total of 5 inhabitants. Ethnic groups in the village include:

- Macedonians 5

Year	Macedonian	Albanian	Turks	Romani	Aromanians	Serbs	Bosniaks	Others	Total
2002	16	...	...	...	...	...	...	...	16
2021	5	...	...	...	...	...	...	...	5
