= Slivnik, Veles =

Slivnik Сливник Slimnik
- Village
- Location within North Macedonia
- Coordinates: 41°43′N 21°40′E
- Country: North Macedonia
- Region: Vardar
- Municipality: Veles

Population (2002)
  - Total: 444
- Time zone: UTC+1 (CET)
  - Summer (DST): UTC+2 (CEST)
- Car plates: VE
- Website: .

Slivnik (Macedonian: Сливник, Albanian: Slimnik) is a village in the municipality of Veles, North Macedonia.

== Demographics ==
Slivnik has traditionally and exclusively been inhabited by Muslim Albanians. Some Muslim Albanians migrated from Slivnik during the twentieth century with Muslim Albanians from Gorno Jabolčište and Dolno Jabolčište replacing them. From 1955 onward, some Sandžaklije also settled in the village.

According to the 2002 census, the village had a total of 444 inhabitants. Ethnic groups in the village include:

- Albanians 443
- Others 1
