= Teovo =

Teovo Теово
- Village
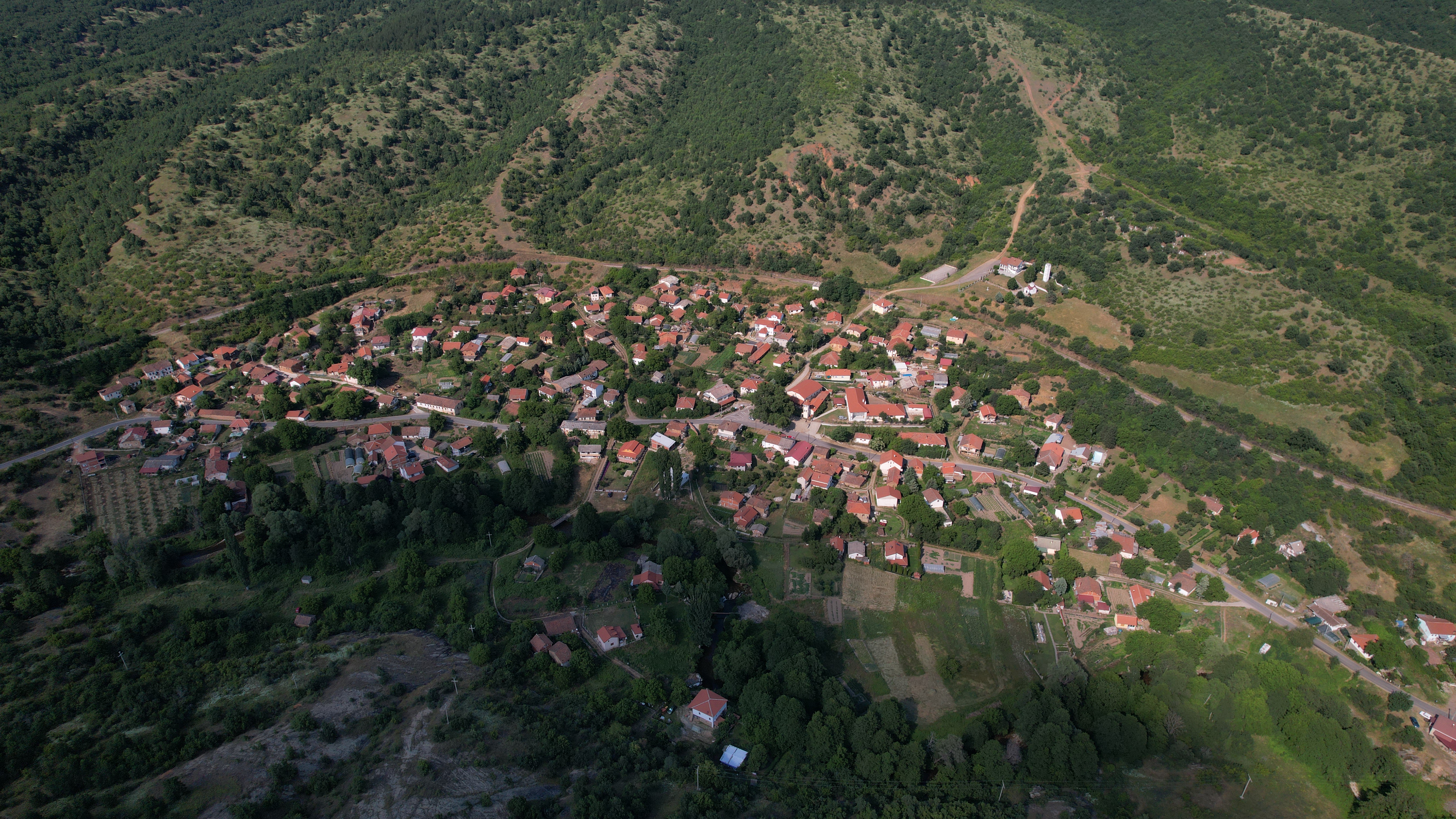
- Air view of the village

- Location within North Macedonia
- Coordinates: 41.578943°N 21.571415°E
- Country: North Macedonia
- Region: Vardar
- Municipality: Čaška

Population (2021)
  - Total: 104
- Time zone: UTC+1 (CET)
  - Summer (DST): UTC+2 (CEST)
- Website: .

Teovo (Macedonian: Теово) is a village in the municipality of Čaška, North Macedonia. It used to be part of the former municipality of Bogomila.

== Demographics ==
On the 1927 ethnic map of Leonhard Schulze-Jena, the village is written as "Tehovo" and shown as a Serbianized Bulgarian Christian village. According to the 2021 census, the village had a total of 104 inhabitants. Ethnic groups in the village include:

- Macedonians 97
- Others 7

Year	Macedonian	Albanian	Turks	Romani	Vlachs	Serbs	Bosniaks	Others	Total
2002	186	...	...	...	...	1	...	2	189
2021	97	...	...	...	...	...	...	7	104
