= Martolci =

Martolci Мартолци
- Village
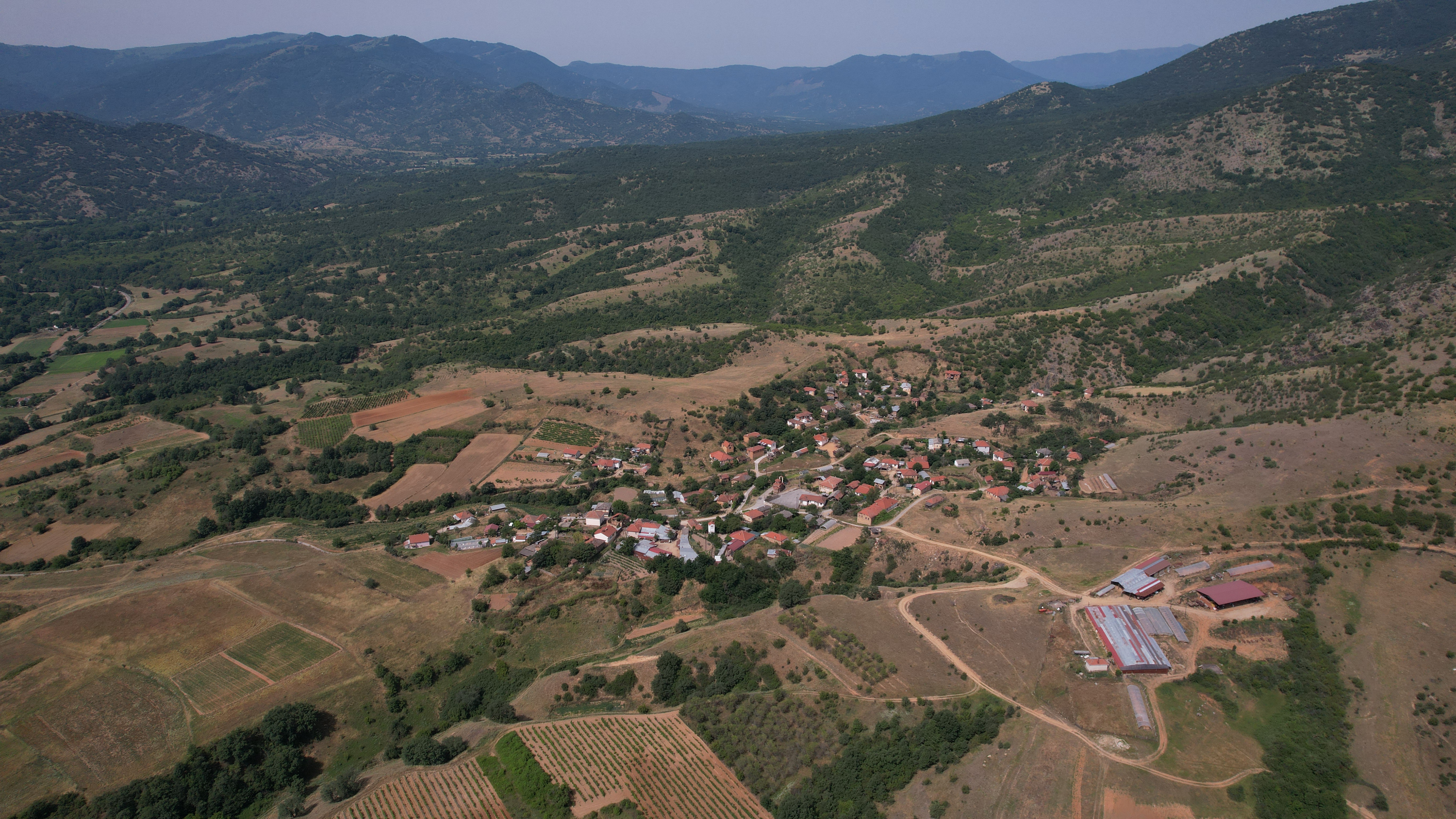
- Air view of the village

- Location within North Macedonia
- Coordinates: 41.566538°N 21.653544°E
- Country: North Macedonia
- Region: Vardar
- Municipality: Čaška

Population (2021)
  - Total: 122
- Time zone: UTC+1 (CET)
  - Summer (DST): UTC+2 (CEST)
- Car plates: VE
- Website: .

Martolci (Macedonian: Мартолци) is a village in the municipality of Čaška, North Macedonia. It used to be part of the former municipality of Izvor.

== Demographics ==
According to the 2021 census, the village had a total of 122 inhabitants. Ethnic groups in the village include:

- Macedonians 113
- Others 9

Year	Macedonian	Albanian	Turks	Romani	Vlachs	Serbs	Bosniaks	Persons for whom data are taken from admin. sources	Total
2002	178	...	...	...	...	...	2	...	180
2021	113	...	...	...	...	...	...	9	122

== Sports ==
The local football club FK Babuna plays in the OFS Veles.
