= Globular Flute =

The Globular Flute (Macedonian: Топчеста Флејта; Latinic: Topchesta flejta) is a Neolithic ocarina-type flute found in 1989 at the Mramor archaeological site near Čaška village, 15 km north of Veles in North Macedonia.

The artifact is a roughly spherical object crafted from refined reddish clay, measuring 4.7 cm in diameter and featuring a hollow interior. Its surface lacks any decorative elements. Three holes puncture the object, each with varying diameters (0.4 cm and 0.6 cm), positioned in a triangular arrangement akin to the apexes of a triangle. The hole positioned at one corner of the triangle is wider than the other two, which are identical. The object has been identified as a musical instrument by the excavators, an ocarina-type globular flute.

The flute has no find context, having been discovered in a ploughed field, but the date of the Neolithic settlement at Mramor ranges from between 5000 and 4000 BC. Although a unique object, experts consider it to be a demonstration of the type of technology available in Neolithic Europe. It is not known if the flute was for performing ritual music or for entertainment, but experiments have been carried out on the melodies produced by the instrument by musician Dragan Dautovski who has played a glass reproduction of the Mramor flute, revealing possible Neolithic melodic registers and scales. Dautovski has said that the timbre of the flute is "almost shocking", and the instrument is "a testimonial to the divine power of music as the oldest cosmic language".

== Links ==
- YouTube videos of Dragan Dautovski playing a replica of the Mramor globular flute: ,
- Getty Images 2007 photograph of Dragan Dautovski holding the flute:
