= Dolno Vranovci =

Dolno Vranovci Vranoc i Poshtëm
- Village
- Долно Врановци
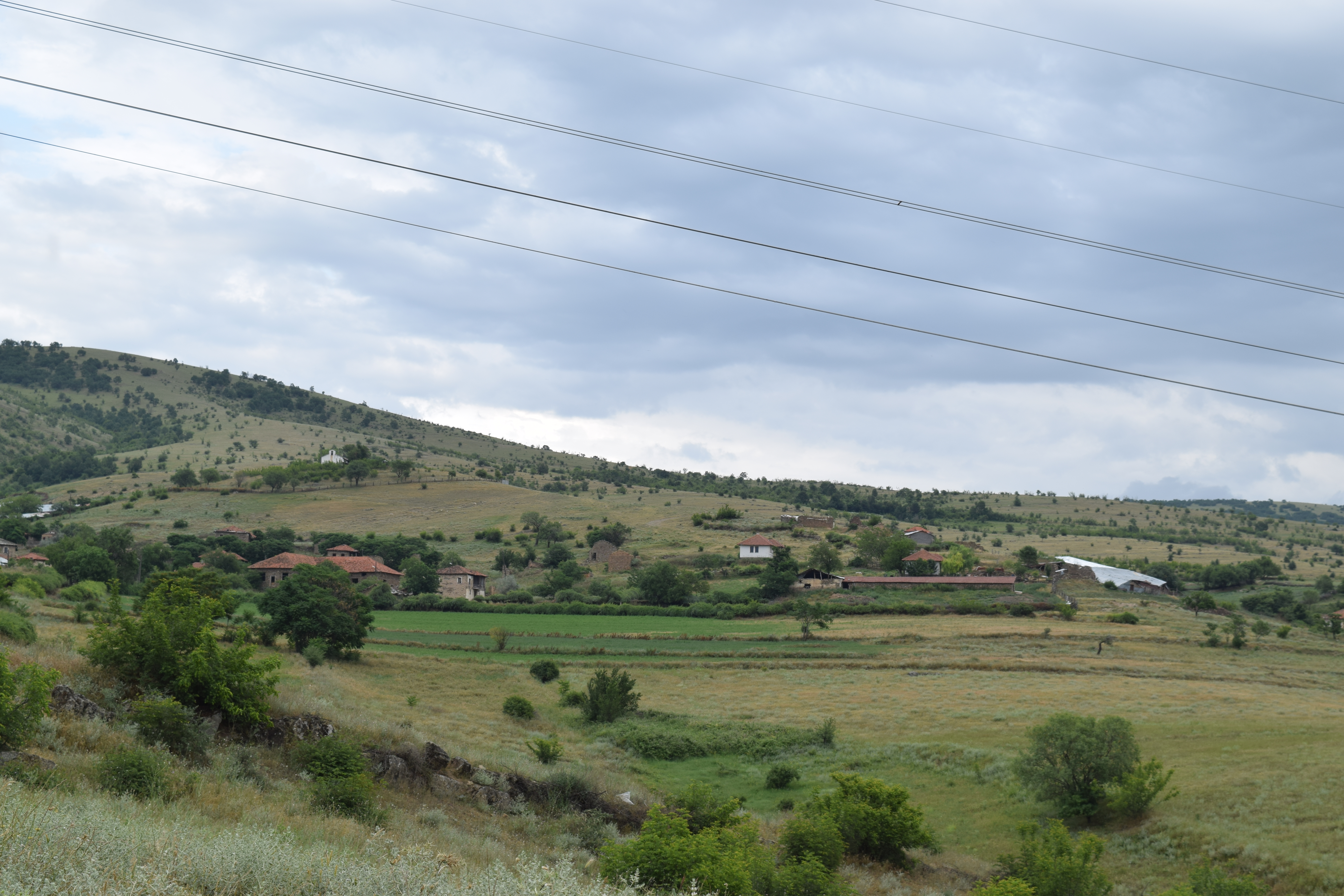
- Panoramic view of the village

- Location within North Macedonia
- Coordinates: 41°35′17″N 21°42′15″E
- Country: North Macedonia
- Region: Vardar
- Municipality: Čaška

Population (2021)
  - Total: 38
- Time zone: UTC+1 (CET)
  - Summer (DST): UTC+2 (CEST)
- Car plates: VE
- Website: .

Dolno Vranovci (Macedonian: Долно Врановци, Albanian: Vranoc i Poshtëm) is a village in the municipality of Čaška, North Macedonia. It used to be part of the former municipality of Izvor.

== Demographics ==
Toward the end of the 19th and beginning of the 20th centuries, Dolno Vranovci was a mixed Orthodox Macedonian and Torbeš village. The latter left the village after the Second World War.

According to the 2021 census, the village had a total of 38 inhabitants. Ethnic groups in the village include:

- Macedonians 27
- Albanians 8
- Others 3

Year	Macedonian	Albanian	Turks	Romani	Vlachs	Serbs	Bosniaks	Others	Total
2002	51	...	...	...	...	...	...	...	51
2021	27	8	...	...	...	...	...	3	38
