= Crešnevo, Čaška =

Crešnevo Crešnevo
- Village
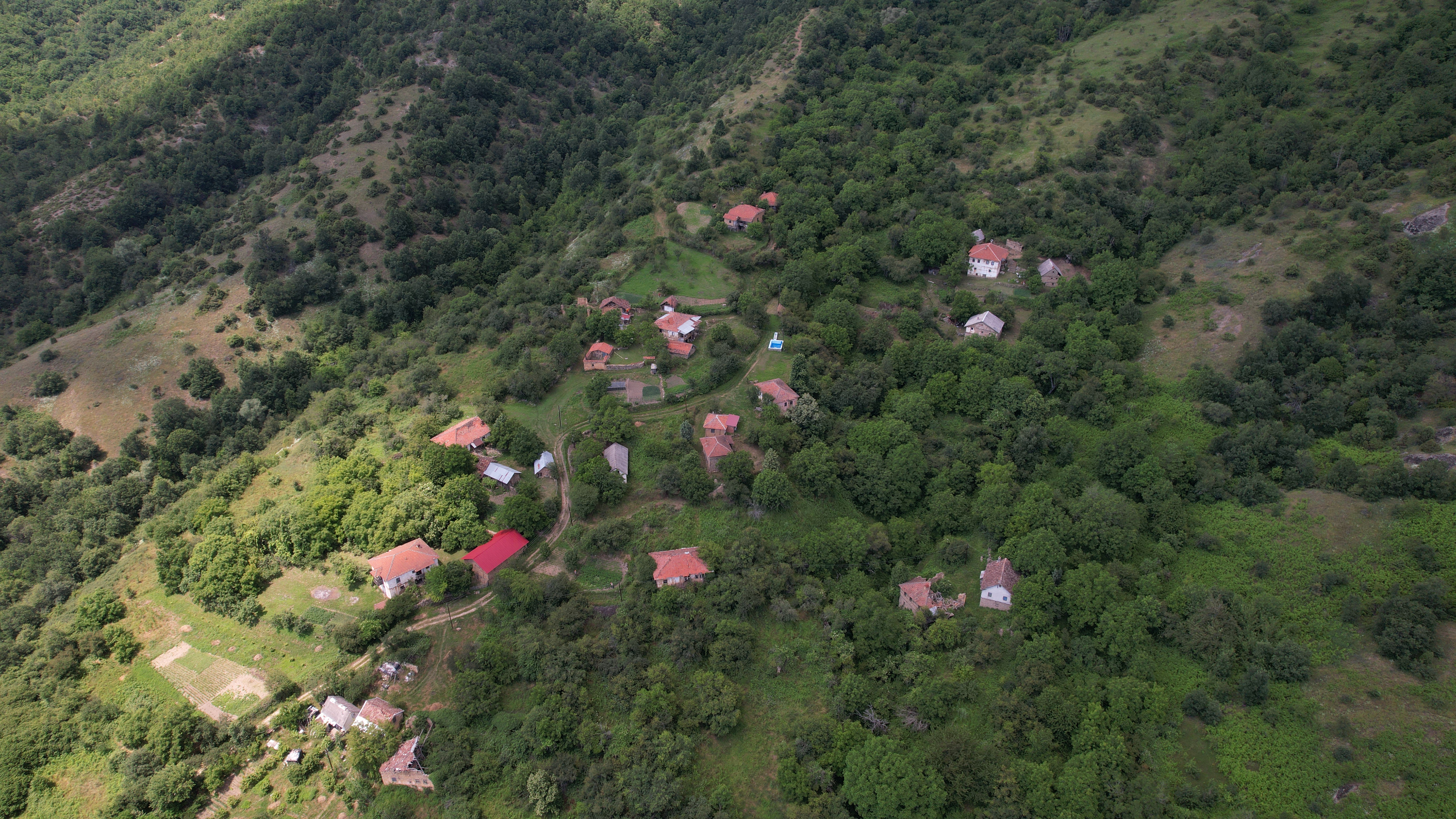
- Air view of the village

- Location within North Macedonia
- Coordinates: 41°37′N 21°42′E
- Country: North Macedonia
- Region: Vardar
- Municipality: Čaška

Population (2021)
  - Total: 1
- Time zone: UTC+1 (CET)
  - Summer (DST): UTC+2 (CEST)
- Car plates: VE
- Website: .

Crešnevo (Macedonian: Crešnevo) is a village in the municipality of Čaška, North Macedonia.

== Demographics ==
According to the 2021 census, the village had a total of 1 inhabitant. Ethnic groups in the village include:

- Macedonians 1

Year	Macedonian	Albanian	Turks	Romani	Aromanians	Serbs	Bosniaks	Others	Total
2002	8	...	...	...	...	...	...	...	8
2021	1	...	...	...	...	...	...	...	1
