= Melnica, Čaška =

Melnica Мелница Melnicë
- Village
- Melnica
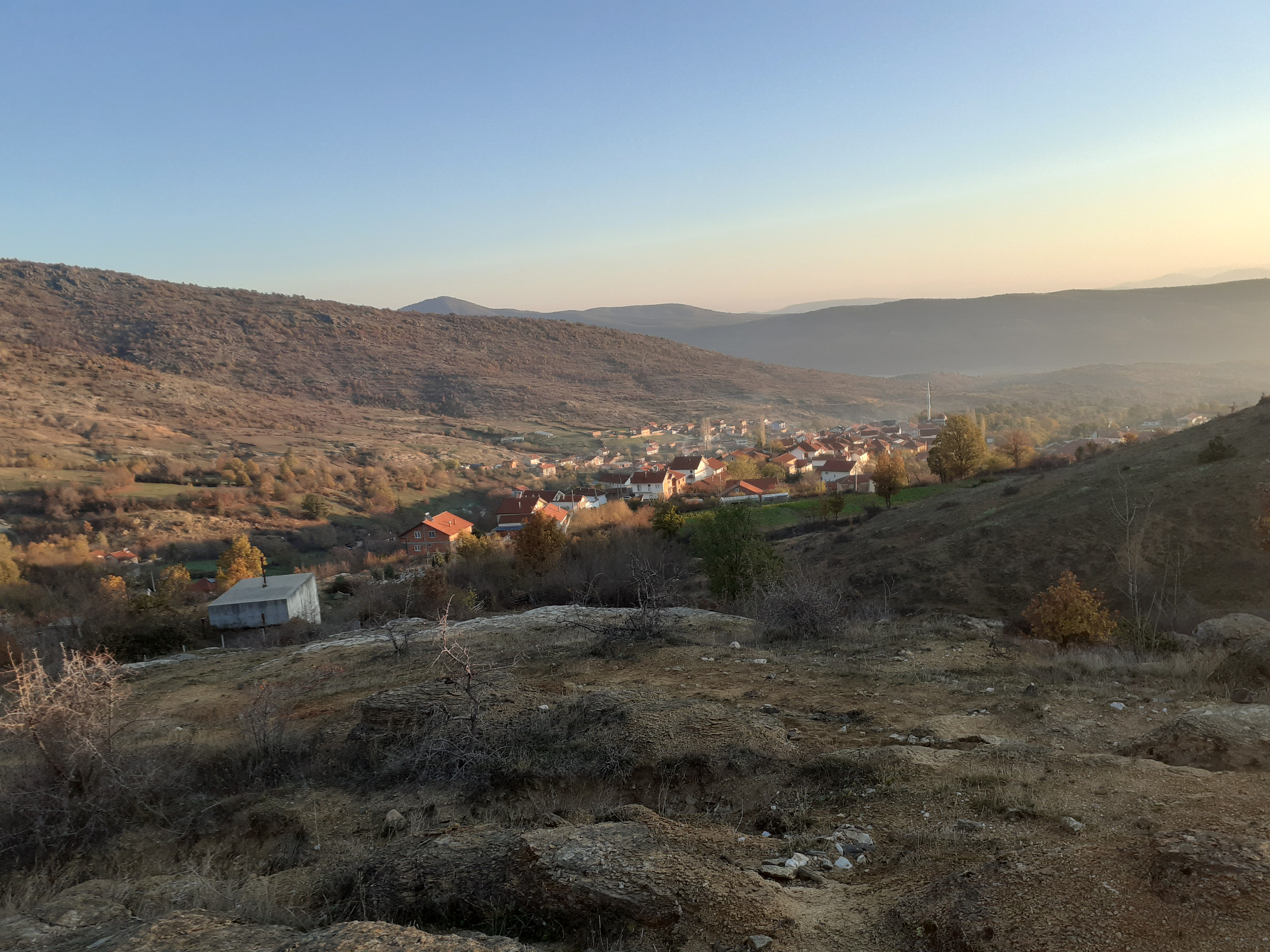

- Location within North Macedonia
- Coordinates: 41°38′33″N 21°35′27″E
- Country: North Macedonia
- Region: Vardar
- Municipality: Čaška

Population (2021)
  - Total: 775
- Time zone: UTC+1 (CET)
  - Summer (DST): UTC+2 (CEST)
- Car plates: VE
- Website: http://melnica.ch/naslovna/ .

Melnica (Macedonian: Мелница, Albanian: Melnicë) is a village in the municipality of Čaška, North Macedonia.

== History ==
The ancestors of Melnica inhabitants were Mijaks who converted to Islam during the 16th century and migrated from the Mala Reka region in the Debar area at the end of the 17th until the 19th centuries to central Macedonia establishing villages such as Melnica. In the 20th century, migration occurred by Melnica inhabitants to Turkey in particular to the city Akhisar with a few other families going to Bursa, Ankara and Edirne.

== Demographics ==
In his 1927 map of Macedonia, German explorer Leonhard Schultze-Jena shows Melnica as Muslim Bulgarian. The village has traditionally been inhabited by a Torbeš population. Though most Torbeš are Sunni, in Melnica followers of Sufi Islam are present attached to various Sufi orders such as the Melami, Halveti and Bektashi. In the 1960s there were 3 Muslim Albanian households in the village.

According to the 2021 census, the village had a total of 775 inhabitants. Ethnic groups in the village include:

- Turks 368
- Macedonians 179
- Albanians 87
- Others (incl. Torbeš) 86
- Bosniaks 15
- Persons for whom data are taken from administrative sources 40

Year	Macedonian	Albanian	Turks	Romani	Vlachs	Serbs	Bosniaks	Others (incl. Torbeš)	Persons for whom data are taken from admin. sources	Total
2002	304	14	378	...	...	1	14	32	n/a	743
2021	179	87	368	...	...	...	15	86	40	775

== See also ==
- Macedonian Muslims
