= Caska =

Caska may refer to:

- Čaška, a village and municipality in North Macedonia
- Caska, Croatia, a village on the island of Pag, Lika-Senj County
