= Busilci =

Busilci Бусилци Busilcë
- Village
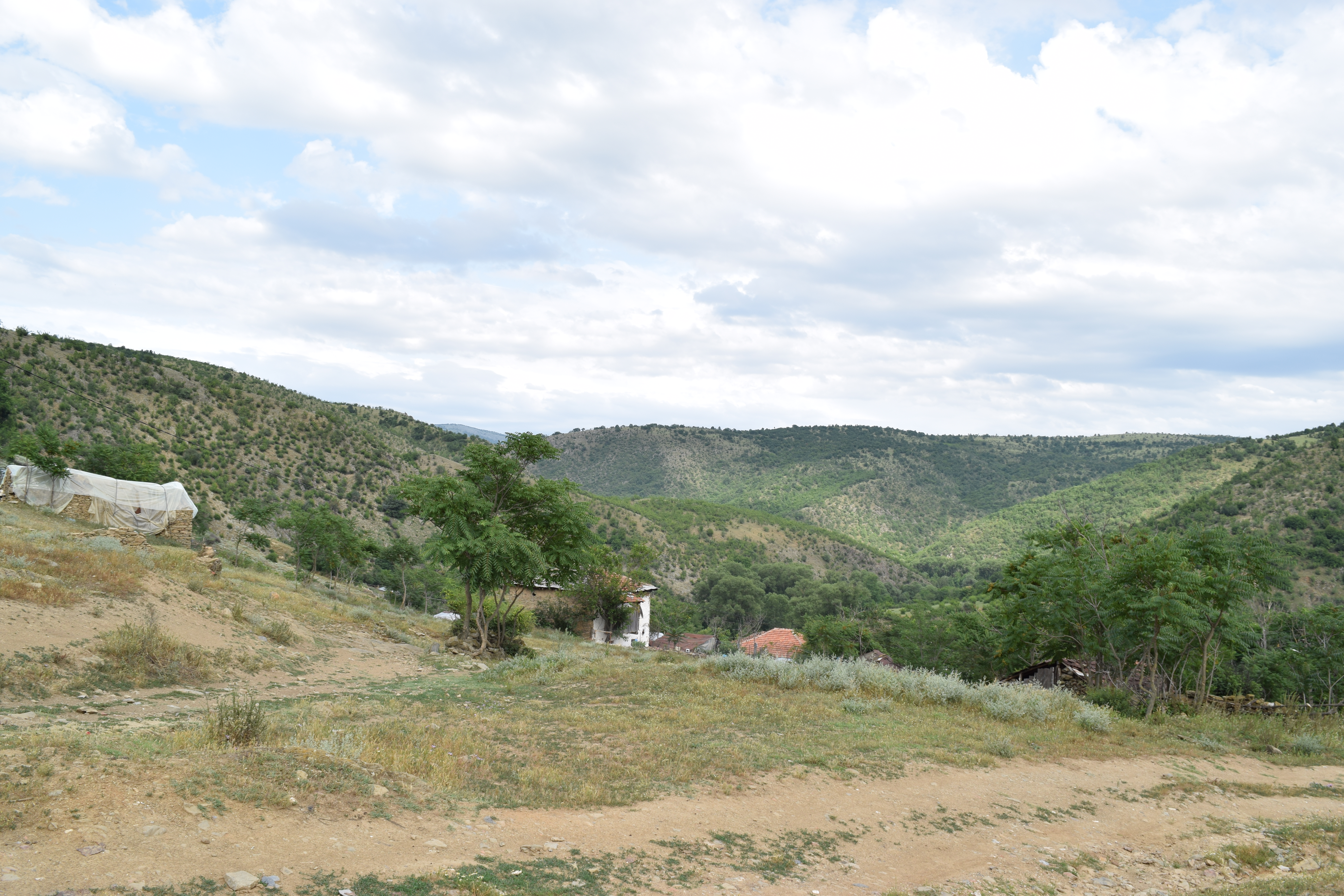

- Location within North Macedonia
- Coordinates: 41°37′N 21°42′E
- Country: North Macedonia
- Region: Vardar
- Municipality: Čaška

Population (2021)
  - Total: 15
- Time zone: UTC+1 (CET)
  - Summer (DST): UTC+2 (CEST)
- Car plates: VE
- Website: .

Busilci (Macedonian: Бусилци, Albanian: Busilcë) is a village in the municipality of Čaška, North Macedonia.

== Demographics ==
According to the 2021 census, the village had a total of 15 inhabitants. Ethnic groups in the village include:

- Albanians 15

Year	Macedonian	Albanian	Turks	Romani	Vlachs	Serbs	Bosniaks	Others	Total
2002	10	6	...	...	...	...	...	2	18
2021	...	15	...	...	...	...	...	...	15
