= Otištino =

- Village
- Отиштино; Hotishtina
- Location within North Macedonia
- Coordinates: 41°41′N 21°41′E
- Country: North Macedonia
- Region: Vardar
- Municipality: Čaška

Population (2021)
  - Total: 39
- Time zone: UTC+1 (CET)
  - Summer (DST): UTC+2 (CEST)
- Car plates: VE
- Website: .

Otištino (Macedonian: Отиштино, Albanian: Hotishtina) is a village in the municipality of Čaška, North Macedonia.

== Demographics ==
In the 1960s there was 1 Muslim Albanian household in the village.

According to the 2021 census, the village had a total of 39 inhabitants. Ethnic groups in the village include:

- Albanians 22
- Bosniaks 17

Year	Macedonian	Albanian	Turks	Romani	Vlachs	Serbs	Bosniaks	Others	Total
2002	...	6	...	...	...	...	53	...	59
2021	...	22	...	...	...	...	17	...	39
