= Stari Grad, Čaška =

Stari Grad Stari Grad Stari Grad
- Village
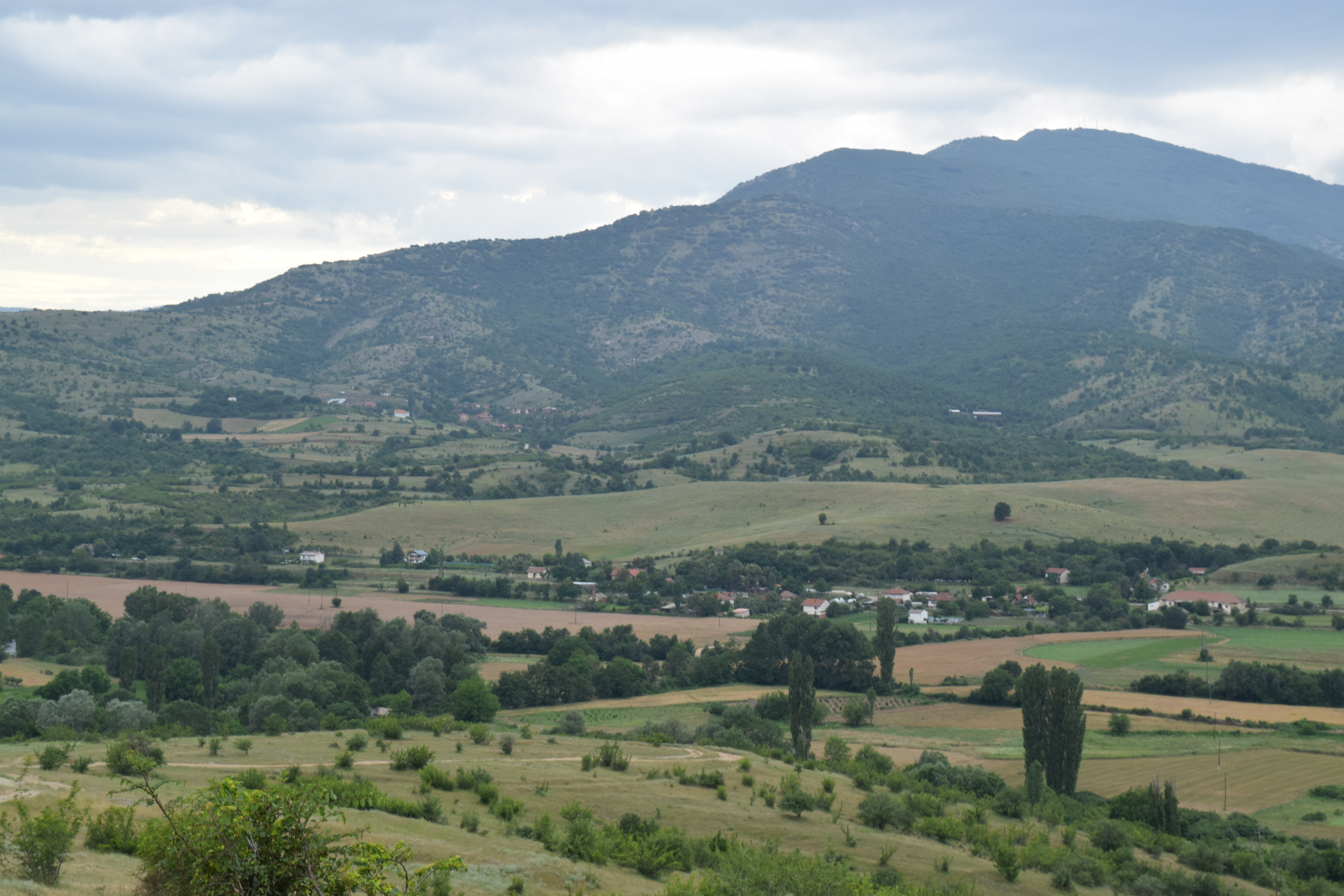

- Location within North Macedonia
- Coordinates: 41°37′N 21°42′E
- Country: North Macedonia
- Region: Vardar
- Municipality: Čaška

Population (2021)
  - Total: 83
- Time zone: UTC+1 (CET)
  - Summer (DST): UTC+2 (CEST)
- Car plates: VE
- Website: .

Stari Grad (Macedonian: Stari Grad, Albanian: Stari Grad) is a village in the municipality of Čaška, North Macedonia.

== Demographics ==
According to the 2021 census, the village had a total of 83 inhabitants. Ethnic groups in the village include:

- Macedonians 62
- Albanians 15
- Others 6

Year	Macedonian	Albanian	Turks	Romani	Aromanians	Serbs	Bosniaks	Persons for whom data are taken from admin. sources	Total
2002	94	1	...	...	...	...	...	...	95
2021	62	15	...	...	...	...	...	6	83
