= Young Macedonian Literary Society =

Bulgarian literary association

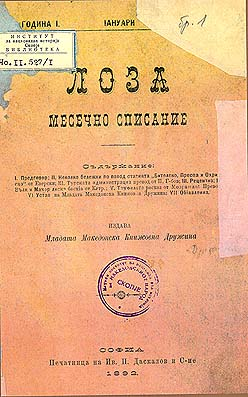
The Young Macedonian Literary Society's magazine Loza adhered to the Bulgarian position on the issue of the Macedonian Slavs' ethnicity, it also favored revising the Bulgarian orthography by bringing it closer to the dialects spoken in Macedonia.

The Young Macedonian Literary Society, also known as Young Macedonian Literary Association, was founded in 1891 in Sofia, Bulgaria. The association was formed as primarily a cultural and educational society. It published a magazine called Loza (The Vine).

== Background ==
Following the establishment of the Bulgarian Exarchate in 1870, as a result of plebiscites held between 1872 and 1875, the Slavic population in the bishoprics of Skopje and Ohrid voted overwhelmingly in favor of joining the new national Church (Skopje by 91%, Ohrid by 97%). At that time a long discussion was held in the Bulgarian periodicals about the need for a dialectal group (Eastern Bulgarian, Western Macedonian or compromise) upon which to base the new standard and which dialect that should be. During the 1870s this issue became contentious and sparked fierce debates.

After a distinct Bulgarian state was established in 1878, Macedonia remained outside its borders. In the 1880s, the Bulgarian codificators rejected the idea of a Macedono-Bulgarian linguistic compromise and chose eastern Bulgarian dialects as a basis for standard Bulgarian. One purpose of the Young Macedonian Literary Society was to defend the Macedonian dialects, and to have them more represented in the Bulgarian language. Their articles were about literature, science and social life.

== Foundation and ideology ==
The organization was established in Sofia, Bulgaria, in 1891, as a type of cultural and educational society by Macedonian emigrants. It had the purpose of protecting the various Macedonian dialects and was composed of campaigners against the Bulgarian Exarchate. In January 1892, it created and published a monthly magazine called Loza (The Vine), which is where their name "Lozari" (Lozars) was derived from. The first issue of the magazine was printed in Sofia in January 1892 and its main article contained the Program Principles of the organization. The association's founders included Kosta Shahov, its chairman.

After the activities of the organization in Bulgaria were interpreted as "Macedonian separatism", in the middle of 1892, Bulgarian prime minister Stefan Stambolov's government officially banned the organization. The Bulgarian press pointed to Theodosius of Skopje as "ideal initiator" for the "separatist movement" that was spread in Sofia, and from there across Macedonia. In May 1894, after the fall of Stambolov, the Macedonian Youth Society in Sofia revived the Young Macedonian Literary Society. The new group had a newspaper called Glas Makedonski and opened a Reading Room Club.

The group included a number of educators, revolutionaries, and public figures from Macedonia—Evtim Sprostranov, Petar Poparsov, Thoma Karayovov, Hristo Popkotsev, Dimitar Mirchev, Andrey Lyapchev, Naum Tyufekchiev, Georgi Balaschev, Georgi Belev, etc. Later, for a short time, Dame Gruev, Gotse Delchev, Luka Dzherov, Ivan Hadzhinikolov and Hristo Matov were also involved in the company. Their future activity did not reflect Macedonian nationalism, while its former members became part of the Internal Macedonian Revolutionary Organization (IMRO), the Supreme Macedonian-Adrianople Committee (SMAC) and other Macedonian Bulgarian nationalist organizations, as well as becoming Bulgarian politicians, scholars and intellectuals. The Greek national activist from Aromanian background Konstantinos Bellios was considered a "Macedonian compatriot" by the Lozars. The members of the Young Macedonian Literary Association self-identified as Macedonian Bulgarians.

== Reception and legacy ==
Its magazine Loza was attacked in the Bulgarian press as "separatist." An article in the official People's Liberal Party newspaper "Svoboda" blamed the organization for lack of loyalty and separatism. The Society rejected these accusations of linguistic and national separatism, and in a response to "Svoboda" claimed that their "society is far from any separatist thoughts, in which we were accused and to say that the ideal of Young Macedonian Literary Society is not separatism, but unity of the entire Bulgarian nation". In the second issue of their magazine, they denied that they were working for the creation of a Macedonian language. Krste Misirkov saw the movement of the Lozars as Macedonian separatist, with the aim to introduce the Macedonian literary language. However, per Victor Friedman, only the first issue of the six issues of the magazine was linguistically distinct from Bulgarian and the group focused more on political issues rather than linguistic issues. He also claims that the existence of a public constitution published in Sofia and a secret one printed in Romania suggests that the organization used Bulgarian language to create the impression of being unitarians i.e. supporting common Macedono-Bulgarian language, while in reality they were separatists. Gyorche Petrov had a positive view about the movement, seeing it as a struggle against the Exarchate to lead public life in Macedonia. A number of Macedonian academics and authors, such as Dimitar Mitrev, Dare Džambaz, Petar Stojanov, Blaže Ristovski and Slavko Dimevski, have falsely claimed that the Lozars were proponents of Macedonian national separatism. Fikret Adanir claims that the primary objective of the organization was to create a separate Macedonian literary language, which ultimately contributed to the development of Macedonian national identity. Canadian-Macedonian historian Andrew Rossos saw expression of Macedonian nationalism in their activity. However, the Lozars demonstrated both: Bulgarian and Macedonian loyalty and combined their Bulgarian nationalism with Macedonian political and cultural identity.
