= Sphenomorphus schultzei =

Conservation status
- Least Concern (IUCN 3.1)

Scientific classification
- Kingdom: Animalia
- Phylum: Chordata
- Class: Reptilia
- Order: Squamata
- Family: Scincidae
- Genus: Sphenomorphus
- Species: S. schultzei

Binomial name
- Sphenomorphus schultzei (T. Vogt, 1911)

Synonyms
- Lygosoma (Hinulia) schultzei T. Vogt, 1911; Lygosoma beauforti de Jong, 1927; Sphenomorphus schultzei — Greer, 1973

Species of lizard

Sphenomorphus schultzei is a species of skink, a lizard in the family Scincidae. The species is endemic to Oceania.

== Etymology ==
The specific name, schultzei, is in honor of German ethnographer Leonhard Schultze-Jena.

The specific name of the junior synonym, beauforti, is in honor of Dutch zoologist Lieven Ferdinand de Beaufort.

== Geographic range ==
S. schultzei is found in Indonesia and Papua New Guinea.

== Habitat ==
The preferred natural habitat of S. schultzei is forest, at altitudes of 400–1,570 m (1,310–5,150 ft).

== Description ==
S. schultzei is dark brown dorsally, and light brown ventrally.

== Reproduction ==
S. schultzei is oviparous.
