= Elovec =

Elovec Elovec Elovec
- Village
- Location within North Macedonia
- Coordinates: 41°37′N 21°42′E
- Country: North Macedonia
- Region: Vardar
- Municipality: Čaška

Population (2021)
  - Total: 35
- Time zone: UTC+1 (CET)
  - Summer (DST): UTC+2 (CEST)
- Car plates: VE
- Website: .

Elovec (Macedonian: Elovec, Albanian: Elovec) is a village in the municipality of Čaška, North Macedonia.

== Demographics ==
According to the 2021 census, the village had a total of 35 inhabitants. Ethnic groups in the village include:

- Macedonians 22
- Albanians 9
- Others 4

Year	Macedonian	Albanian	Turks	Romani	Aromanians	Serbs	Bosniaks	Others	Total
2002	46	...	...	...	...	...	...	...	46
2021	22	9	...	...	...	...	...	4	35
