= Lieven Ferdinand de Beaufort =

Dutch biologist (1879–1968)

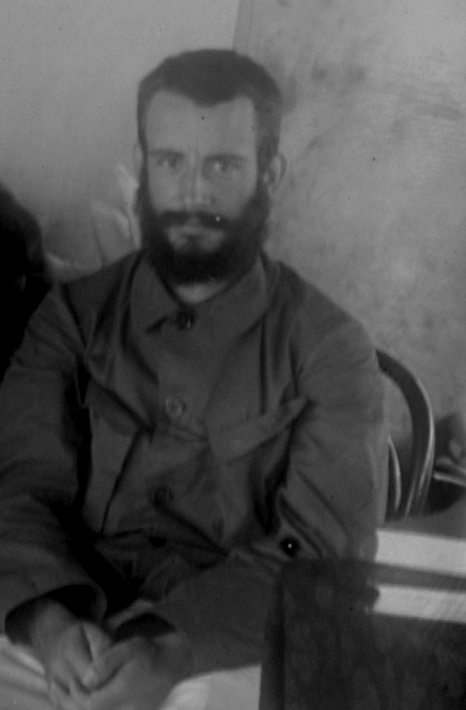
Lieven Ferdinand de Beaufort in 1903

Lieven Ferdinand de Beaufort (March 23, 1879 in Den Treek, Leusden – 11 May 1968 in Amersfoort) was a Dutch biologist who, in 1903, participated in the North New Guinea Expedition. In the 1920s he was director of the Zoological Museum of Artis in Amsterdam and later zoogeography professor at the University of Amsterdam.

Beaufort is commemorated in the scientific name of a species of lizard, Sphenomorphus beauforti, which is a synonym of Sphenomorphus schultzei.

== See also ==
- Category:Taxa named by Lieven Ferdinand de Beaufort

== Sources ==
- Prof. dr. L.F. de Beaufort, 1879 - 1968 at the University of Amsterdam Album Academicum website
