= Drenovo, Čaška =

Drenovo Drenovo
- Village
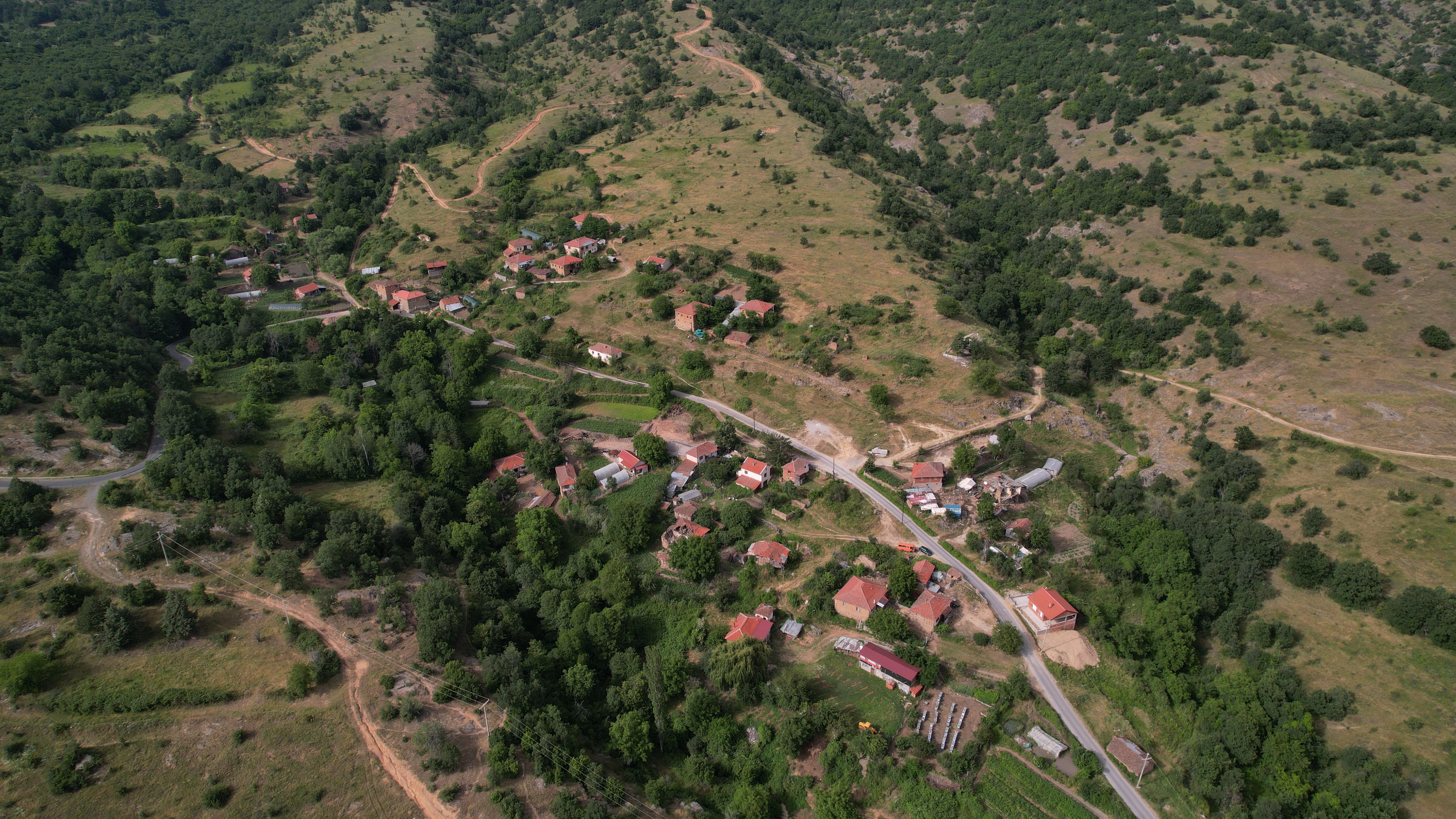
- Air view of the village

- Location within North Macedonia
- Coordinates: 41°37′N 21°42′E
- Country: North Macedonia
- Region: Vardar
- Municipality: Čaška

Population (2021)
  - Total: 24
- Time zone: UTC+1 (CET)
  - Summer (DST): UTC+2 (CEST)
- Car plates: VE
- Website: .

Drenovo (Macedonian: Drenovo) is a village in the municipality of Čaška, North Macedonia.

== Demographics ==
According to the 2021 census, the village had a total of 24 inhabitants. Ethnic groups in the village include:

- Macedonians 15
- Persons for whom data are taken from administrative sources 9

Year	Macedonian	Albanian	Turks	Romani	Aromanians	Serbs	Bosniaks	Persons for whom data are taken from admin. sources	Total
2002	54	...	...	...	...	...	...	...	54
2021	15	...	...	...	...	...	...	9	24
