= Čaška =

Čaška Чашка
- Village
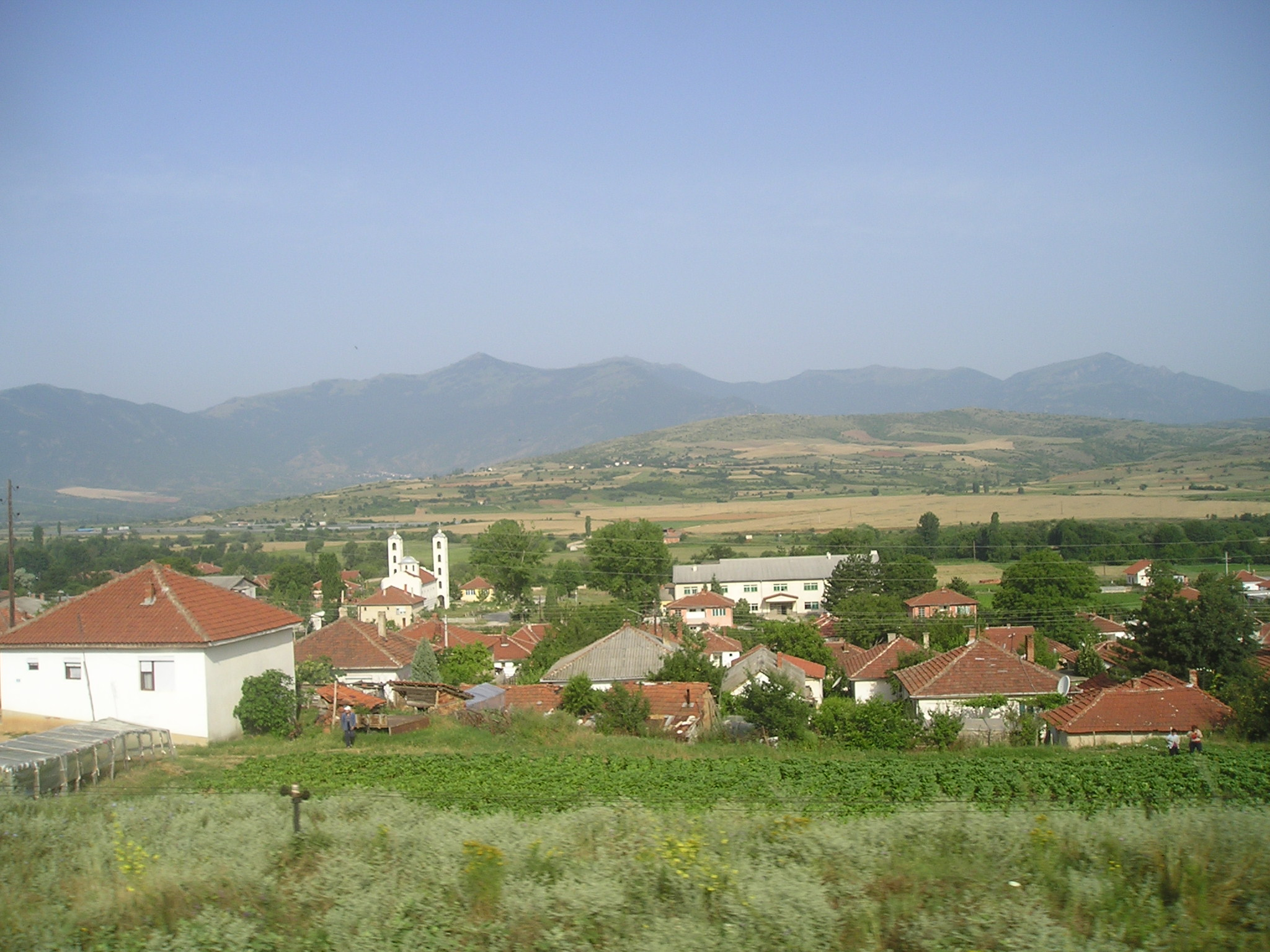
- Čaška

- Location within North Macedonia
- Country: North Macedonia
- Region: Vardar
- Municipality: Čaška

Population (2021)
  - Total: 1,390
- Time zone: UTC+1 (CET)
  - Summer (DST): UTC+2 (CEST)
- Vehicle registration: VE
- Website: .

Čaška (Macedonian: Чашка;) is a village in the Republic of North Macedonia. It is the seat of the Čaška Municipality.

Near the village, historians from the Republic of North Macedonia found a 6,000-year-old flute called the "Globular Flute".

== Demographics ==
On the 1927 ethnic map of Leonhard Schulze-Jena, the village is shown as a Christian Bulgarian village. According to the 2021 census, the village had a total of 1,390 inhabitants. Ethnic groups in the village include:

- Macedonians 1,300
- Persons for whom data are taken from administrative sources 59
- Serbs 23
- Albanian 1
- Vlachs 1
- Others 6

Year	Macedonian	Albanian	Turks	Romani	Vlachs	Serbs	Bosniaks	Others	Persons for whom data are taken from admin. sources	Total
2002	1,425	...	...	...	...	44	...	2	n/a	1,471
2021	1,300	1	...	...	1	23	...	4	59	1,390
