= Rakovec, Čaška =

Rakovec Rakovec
- Village
- Location within North Macedonia
- Coordinates: 41°37′N 21°42′E
- Country: North Macedonia
- Region: Vardar
- Municipality: Čaška

Population (2021)
  - Total: 36
- Time zone: UTC+1 (CET)
  - Summer (DST): UTC+2 (CEST)
- Car plates: VE
- Website: .

Rakovec (Macedonian: Rakovec) is a village in the municipality of Čaška, North Macedonia.

== Demographics ==
According to the 2021 census, the village had a total of 36 inhabitants. Ethnic groups in the village include:

- Macedonians 33
- Others 3

| Year | Macedonian | Albanian | Turks | Romani | Aromanians | Serbs | Bosniaks | Persons for whom data are taken from admin. sources | Total |
|---|---|---|---|---|---|---|---|---|---|
| 2002 | 29 | ... | ... | ... | ... | ... | ... | ... | 29 |
| 2021 | 33 | ... | ... | ... | ... | ... | ... | 3 | 36 |
