= Crešnevo =

Crešnevo Црешнево
- Village
- Location within North Macedonia
- Coordinates: 41.644661°N 21.285173°E
- Country: North Macedonia
- Region: Southwestern
- Municipality: Makedonski Brod

Population (2002)
  - Total: 169
- Time zone: UTC+1 (CET)
  - Summer (DST): UTC+2 (CEST)

Crešnevo (Macedonian: Црешнево) is a village in the municipality of Makedonski Brod, North Macedonia.

== Demographics ==
The village is attested in the 1467/68 Ottoman tax registry (defter) for the Nahiyah of Kırçova. The village had a total of 62 houses, excluding bachelors (mucerred).

According to the 2002 census, the village had a total of 169 inhabitants. Ethnic groups in the village include:

- Macedonians 168
- Serbs 1
