= Aleksandra Popovska =

Aleksandra Popovska Александра Поповска
- Born: Aleksandra Popovska; Serbia, Former Yugoslavia
- Origin: Macedonia
- Genres: Vocal music, Macedonian folk music, Contemporary classical music, Electroacoustic music, Jazz, Pop
- Occupations: Singer, composer, educator, visual artist, performance artist
- Instruments: Voice, piano, traditional macedonian flutes
- Years active: 1997–present
- Label: Independent
- Website: aleksandrapopovska.com

Aleksandra Popovska (Macedonian: Александра Поповска) is a vocalist, multimedia artist, educator, and composer/improviser currently resident in The Netherlands. Raised in Yugoslavia, she was exposed to a wide variety of cultural influences. In the Balkans she is known as one of the pioneers in so called "extended vocal techniques". She uses her voice as an instrument and her interests in music are various, from folk and pop to jazz and experimental live electronics. Her freely exploration of different art contexts expands the boundaries of the genres. The focus of her most recent work is on new vocal performance and creation of audio-visual works.

== Career ==
=== 1990s ===
Aleksandra graduated at the Academy of Music in Skopje in 1997. During her studies she performed with female vocal trio (Emilija Lale and Ana Kostova) and collaborated as a session musician with almost all active Macedonian producers and composers from that period (Darko Dimitrov, Kokan Dimushevski, Valentino Skenderovski, Ilija Pejoski, Kire Kostov, etc..). She participated in recordings of over twenty CDs in different music genres with Macedonian artists such as TB Traceri, Arhangel, Karolina Gočeva, Erzana, Toše Proeski, Kaliopi, Igor Dzambazov, Tijana Dapčević, Vrčak, Marina Rebeka, Biba Dodeva, and Adrian Gadza.

=== 2000s ===
In 2000(since), Aleksandra become a main vocalist in Dragan Dautovski Quartet, performing in more than twenty countries around the world. The quartet is mainly notable for their very distinctive style of music, which encompasses complex rhythms and lyric approach to the arrangements of Macedonian folk tunes. They released several albums and became popular in Macedonia and The Balkans. The success of both albums, Path of the sun and Razboj sparked an international interest in new Macedonian music.

== Dutch days ==
Since 2004, Popovska is based in The Netherlands. After completing her music education in The Netherlands and England (music performance, production, applied composition & multimedia), she became very active as a multimedia artist. Working on many multidisciplinary projects as a performer, composer, producer or concept designer, her works includes more than 50 musical compositions in different genres. Smaller forms for various instrumental/vocal soloists and groups, including usage of electronic musical instruments and computers are her main interest. Recent works includes music composed for context such as media performance, documentaries, animation, music theater, video installations, etc.

== Visual art ==
Aleksandra Popovska is known primarily of her career as a musician. Much less were written about her life as a visual artist. Her collection of images consist of more than two hundred pieces of various artwork (acrylic paintings, drawings, digital works, hand made objects, photography). Since 2005 she is more active in the Netherlands, presenting her art. As a part of the project "Show your hope" her painting "Snail story" traveled around the world.

== Discography ==
- Roots and blossoms, 2000
- Path of the sun, 2002
- Raam o Lash, Zoli Soos, 2005
- Three voices by Morton Feldman, 2006
- Flame 2014
- And the moon shines on 2014
