= Azot (region) =

Region in North Macedonia

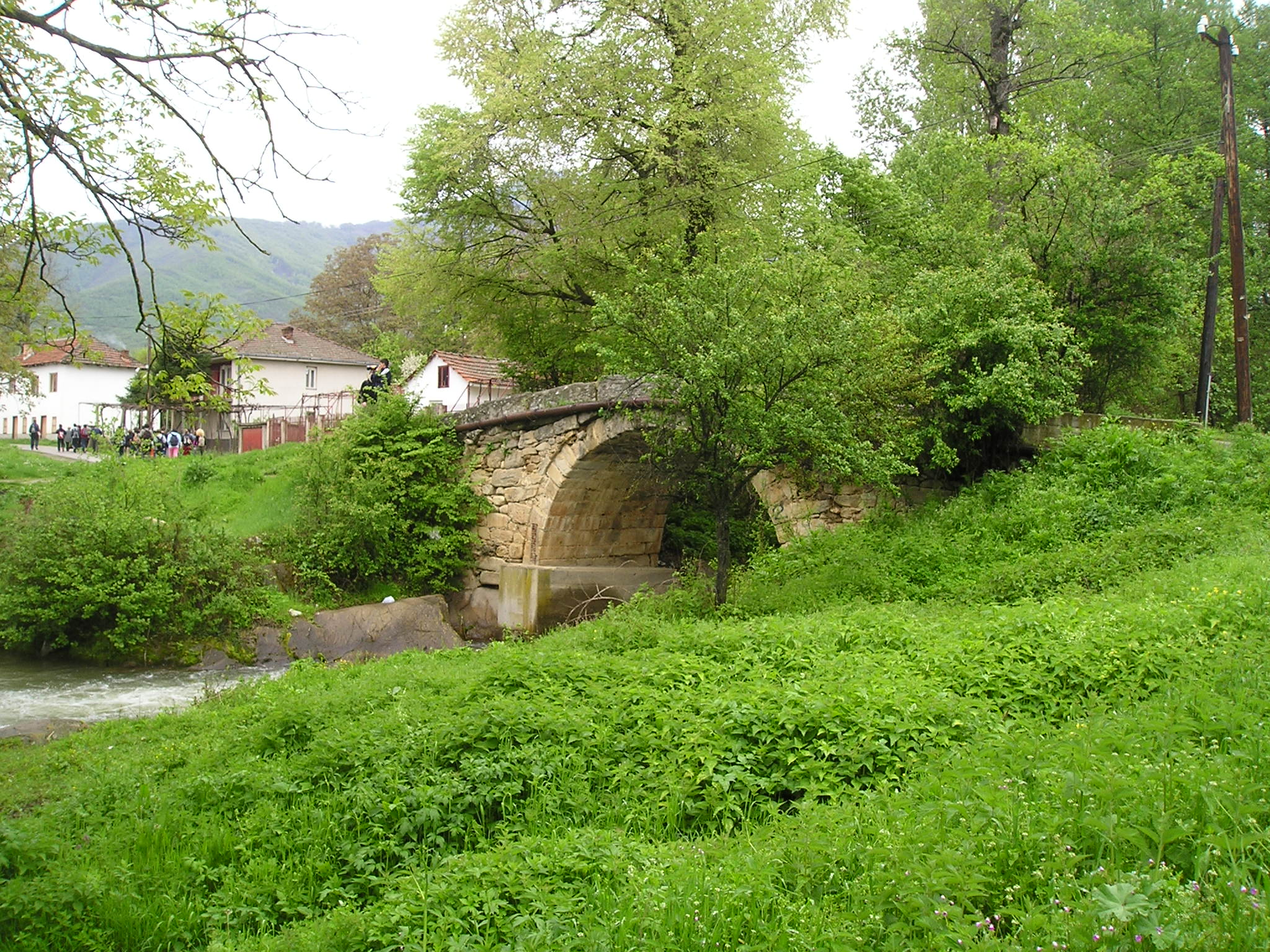
The old stone bridge over the Babuna river next to the village of Bogomila.

Azot (Macedonian: Азот) is a historical and geographic region in North Macedonia located in the south-west of the city of Veles in the valley of Babuna mountain.
