= Oreše =

Oreše Ореше
- Village
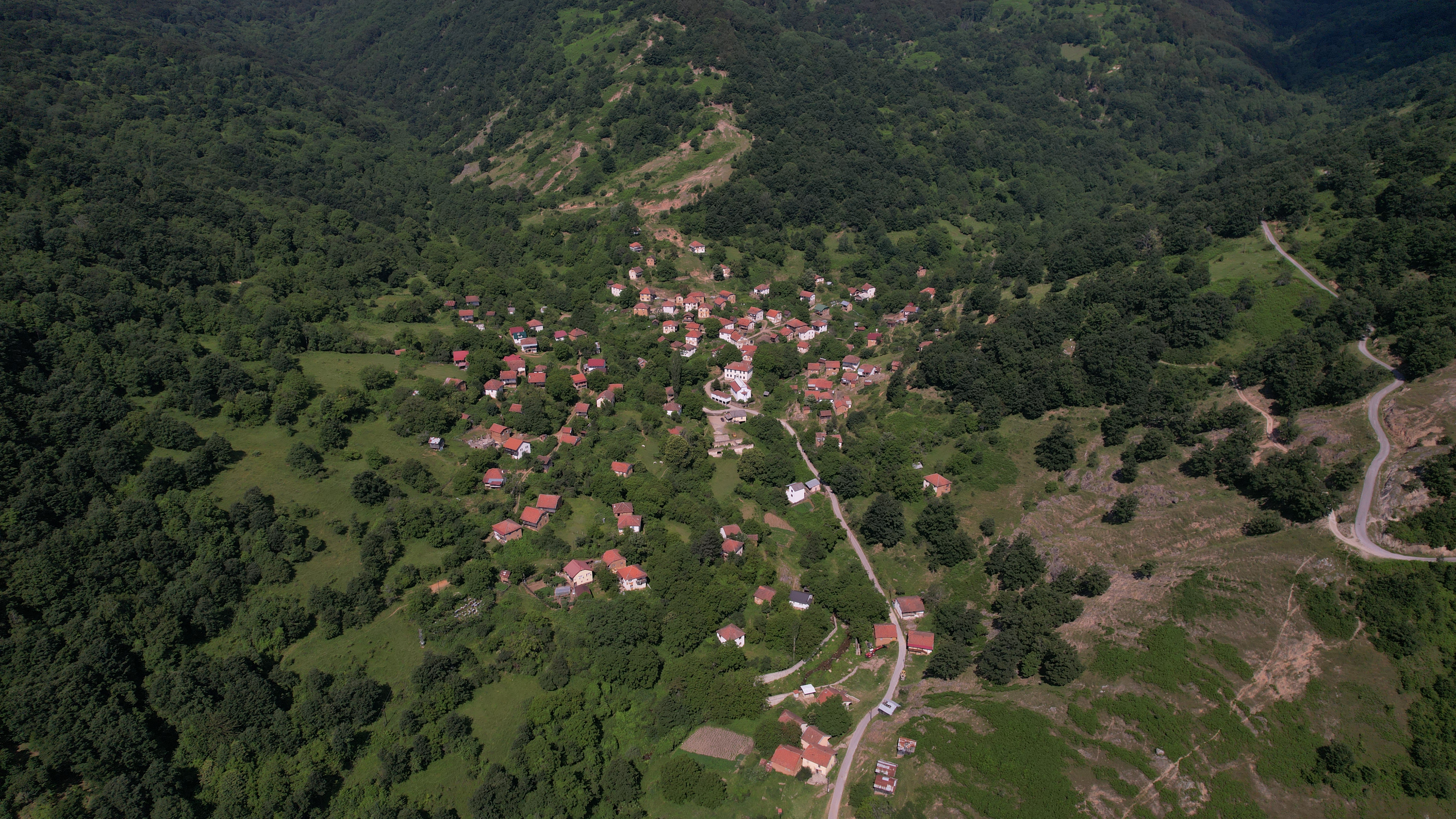
- Air view of the village

- Location within Macedonia
- Coordinates: 41.619449°N 21.419623°E
- Country: North Macedonia
- Region: Vardar
- Municipality: Čaška

Population (2021)
  - Total: 71
- Time zone: UTC+1 (CET)
  - Summer (DST): UTC+2 (CEST)
- Website: .

Oreše (Macedonian: Ореше) is a village in the municipality of Čaška, North Macedonia. It used to be part of the former municipality of Bogomila.

== Demographics ==
According to the 2021 census, the village had a total of 71 inhabitants. Ethnic groups in the village include:

- Macedonians 50
- Others 21

Year	Macedonian	Albanian	Turks	Romani	Vlachs	Serbs	Bosniaks	Persons for whom data are taken from admin. sources	Total
2002	218	...	...	...	...	...	...	...	218
2021	50	...	...	...	...	...	...	21	71
