= Izvor, Čaška =

Izvor Извор
- Village
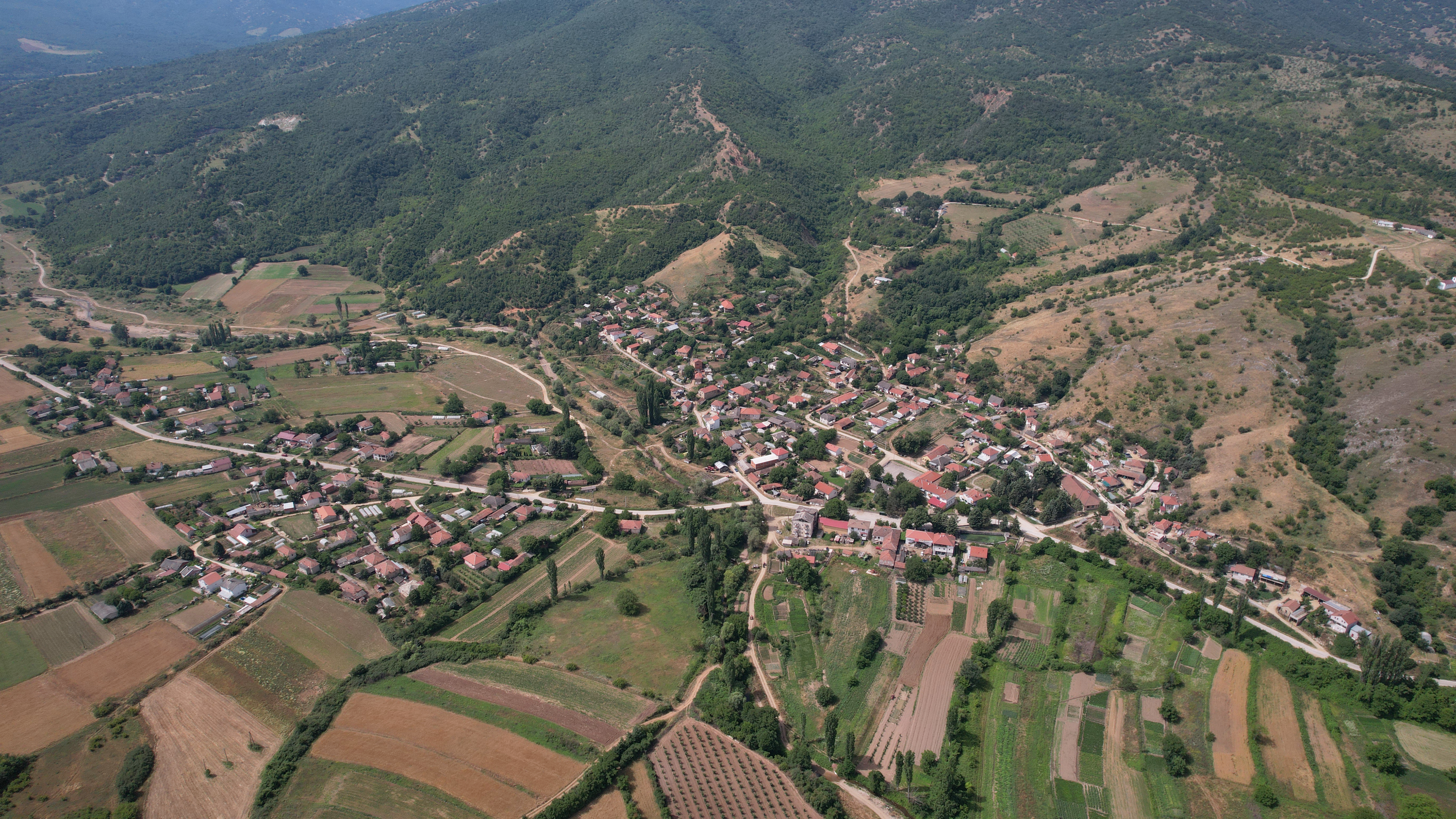
- Air view of the village

- Location within North Macedonia
- Coordinates: 41°33′17″N 21°41′50″E
- Country: North Macedonia
- Region: Vardar
- Municipality: Čaška

Population (2021)
  - Total: 312
- Time zone: UTC+1 (CET)
  - Summer (DST): UTC+2 (CEST)

Izvor (Macedonian: Извор) is a village in the municipality of Čaška, North Macedonia. It was previously the seat of the Izvor Municipality.

== Demographics ==
According to the national census of 2021, the village had a total of 312 inhabitants. Ethnic groups in the municipality include:

- Macedonians 281
- Albanians 2
- Serbs 1
- Persons for whom data are taken from administrative sources 28

Year	Macedonian	Albanian	Turks	Romani	Vlachs	Serbs	Bosniaks	Persons for whom data are taken from admin. sources	Total
2002	477	...	...	...	...	3	...	...	480
2021	281	2	...	...	...	1	...	28	312
