= Čaška Municipality =

Municipality of Northern Macedonia

Coordinates: 41.64°N 21.67°E

Čaška Municipality Општина Чашка Komuna e Çashkës
- Rural municipality
- Flag Seal

- Country: North Macedonia
- Region: Vardar
- Municipal seat: Čaška

Government
  - Mayor: Suat Shaqiri (BDI)

Area
  - Total: 819.45 km^{2} (316.39 sq mi)

Population (2002)
  - Total: 7,942
  - Density: 9.692/km^{2} (25.10/sq mi)
- Time zone: UTC+1 (CET)
- Postal code: 1413
- Area code: 043
- Vehicle registration: VE
- Website: www.caska.gov.mk

Čaška (Macedonian: Чашка, Albanian: Çashkë) is a municipality in the central part of North Macedonia. Čaška is also the name of the village where the municipal seat is located. This municipality is part of the Vardar Statistical Region.

== Geography ==
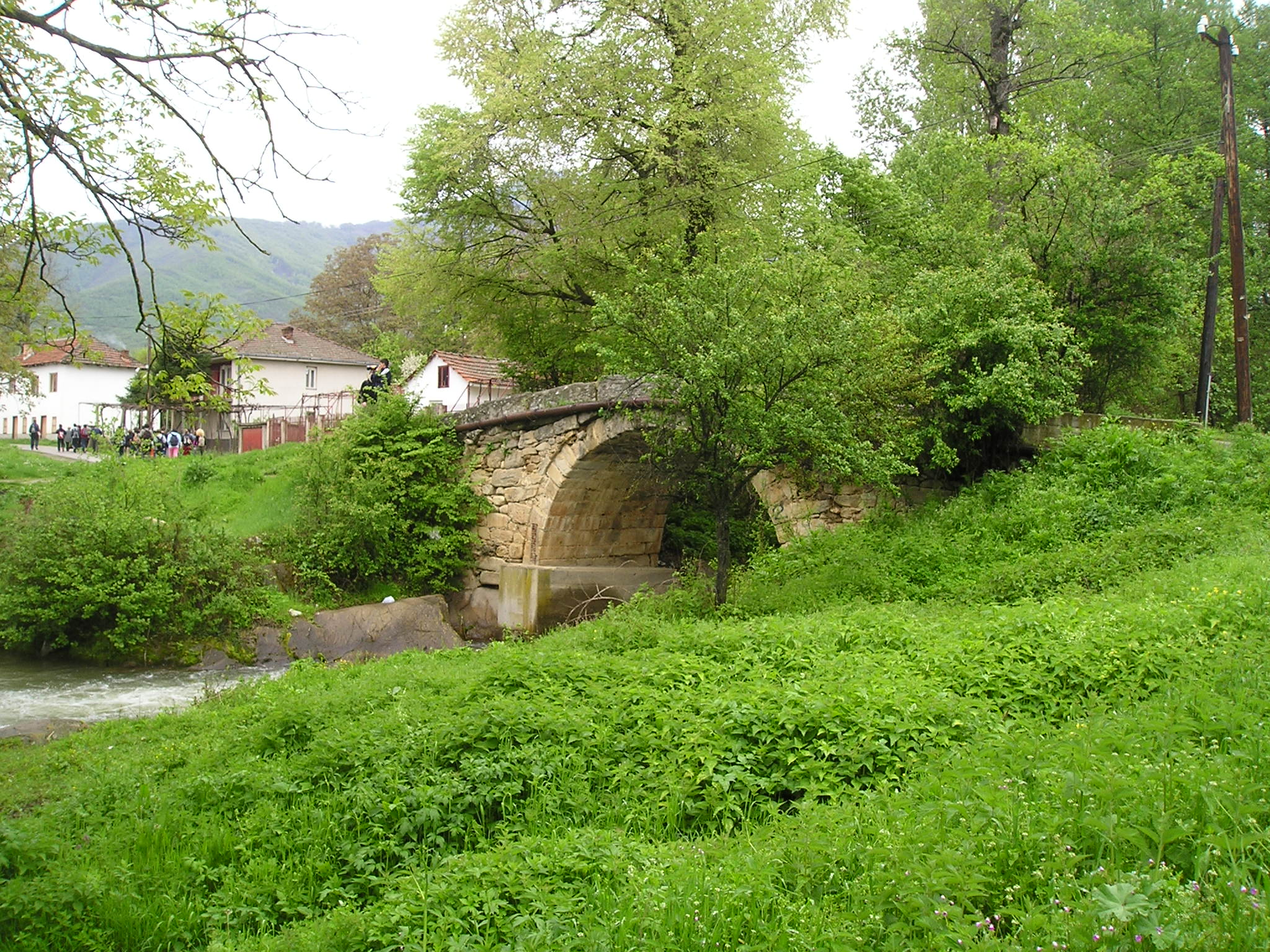
Bogomila

The Municipality of Čaška is located in the central part of the country. It covers an area of 819.45 km^{2} and by the territory is one of the three largest municipalities in Northern Macedonia. It is a rural municipality with a good geographical position. The municipality has a total arable land of 476 km^{2} and 48.97 km^{2} of pastures.

The municipality borders to the north Zelenikovo Municipality and Studeničani Municipality, to the east Veles Municipality and Gradsko Municipality, to the west Makedonski Brod Municipality, to the south-west Dolneni Municipality, to the south Prilep Municipality and to the south-east Kavadarci Municipality and Rosoman. The municipality of Čaška includes 42 settlements. The population density is 10 inhabitants per km^{2}.

The municipality has a good geographical position. There are beautiful and attractive areas of the mountains Jakupica, Dautica and Babuna from the west, Klepa from the east, Karadzicica and Golesnica from the north-west. On the western border of the municipality is the highest peak of Jakupica, Solunska Glava (2,540 m). The main rivers are Babuna and Topolka. Along the course of these rivers there is an alluvial field formed as a result of river sediments which is very fertile. The hydropower plant "Lisiće" has been built recently.

The climatic characteristics of the municipality are quite different. The high mountains are covered with snow during all the year, while in the flat part in the summer period there is an unbearably high temperature. The climate is continental. Rainfall is light mainly on autumn and winter days, and summers are hot and dry. Winds come from all directions, but prevail from the north and northwest.

== History ==
The Municipality of Čaška was established in 1996. By the 2004 according to the new territorial division of the Republic, the rural Bogomila Municipality and Izvor Municipality as well as the most western part of Veles Municipality were attached to Čaška Municipality.

== Demographics ==
According to the 2021 North Macedonia census, Čaška Municipality has 7,942 inhabitants. Ethnic groups in the municipality:

	2002		2021	
	Number	%	Number	%
TOTAL	7,673	100	7,942	100
Albanians	2,703	35.23	4,032	50.77
Macedonians	4,395	57.28	3,071	38.67
Turks	391	5.1	373	4.7
Bosniaks	67	0.87	35	0.44
Serbs	55	0.72	24	0.3
Vlachs	1	0.01	1	0.01
Other / Undeclared / Unknown	61	0.79	104	1.31
Persons for whom data are taken from administrative sources			302	3.8

=== Religions ===
Religious affiliation according to the 2002 Macedonia census and 2021 North Macedonia census:

	2002		2021	
	Number	%	Number	%
TOTAL	7,673	100	7,942	100
Islam	3,497	45.58	4,710	59.3
Orthodox	4,145	54.02	909	36.7
Catholics	2	0.03	10	36.7
Protestants and other Christians	..	..	1,994	36.7
Others	29	0.38	17	2.06
Persons for whom data are taken from administrative sources			302	3.80

=== Demographic trends ===
Live births by ethnic affiliation of mother, 2010-2021

	Macedonians		Albanians		Turks		Bosniaks		Others		TOTAL
Year	Births	%	Births	%	Births	%	Births	%	Births	%	Births
2010	37	23.13	109	68.13	6	3.75	0	0.68	8	5.00	160
2011	26	18.18	111	77.62	3	2.10	0	1.05	3	2.10	143
2012	30	17.65	130	76.47	6	3.53	1	0.92	3	1.76	170
2013	38	23.03	116	70.30	4	2.42	1	0.90	6	3.64	165
2014	26	17.33	116	77.33	4	2.67	1	0.46	3	2.00	150
2015	15	11.11	113	83.70	5	3.70	1	0.88	1	0.74	135
2016	21	12.96	127	78.40	8	4.94	4	1.04	2	1.23	162
2017	21	14.69	103	72.03	12	8.39	1	0.79	6	4.20	143
2018	18	13.33	106	78.52	4	2.96	2	1.05	5	3.70	135
2019	16	10.96	116	79.45	3	2.05	2	0.71	9	6.16	146
2020	15	12.61	98	82.35	3	2.52	0	0.94	3	2.52	119
2021	22	17.46	98	77.78	4	3.17	1	1.42	1	0.79	126
2022	38	26.95	93	65.96	7	4.96	1	0.71	2	1.42	141
2023	18	16.51	80	73.40	3	2.70	3	2.70	3	2.70	109
2024	14	13.07	82	76.63	2	1.86	3	2.80	2	1.86	107

== Inhabited places ==
There are 33 inhabited places in this municipality.

Inhabited Places	Total	Macedonians	Albanians	Turks	Roma	Vlachs	Serbs	Bosnians	Others
Čaška Municipality	7,942	3,071	4,032	373	-	-	-	-	468
Banjica	119	19	98	-	-	-	-	-	2
Bistrica	44	41	-	-	-	-	-	-	3
Bogomila	359	319	3	-	-	-	-	-	33
Busilci	15	-	15	-	-	-	-	-	-
Crešnevo	1	1	-	-	-	-	-	-	-
Čaška	1,390	1,300	1	-	-	1	23	-	63
Elovec	35	22	9	-	-	-	-	-	4
Dolno Vranovci	38	27	8	-	-	-	-	-	3
Dolno Jabolčište	1,047	-	1,021	-	-	-	-	1	25
Drenovo	24	15	-	-	-	-	-	-	9
Elovec	35	22	9	-	-	-	-	-	4
Gabrovnik	8	8	-	-	-	-	-	-	-
Golozinci	30	28	2	-	-	-	-	-	-
Gorno Jabolčište	2,444	-	2,401	-	-	-	-	-	33
Gorno Vranovci	318	1	304	5	-	-	-	1	-
Izvor	312	281	2	-	-	-	1	-	28
Lisiče	128	126	2	-	-	-	-	-	-
Martolci	122	113	-	-	-	-	-	-	9
Melnica	775	179	87	368	-	-	-	15	106
Mokreni	5	5	-	-	-	-	-	-	-
Nežilovo	33	30	-	-	-	-	-	-	3
Omorani	172	167	-	-	-	-	-	-	5
Oraov Dol	4	4	-	-	-	-	-	-	-
Oreše	71	50	-	-	-	-	-	-	21
Otištino	39	-	22	-	-	-	-	17	-
Papradište	14	14	-	-	-	-	-	-	-
Rakovec	36	33	-	-	-	-	-	-	3
Smilovci	8	8	-	-	-	-	-	-	-
Sogle	116	70	41	-	-	-	-	-	5
Stari Grad	83	62	15	-	-	-	-	-	6
Teovo	104	97	-	-	-	-	-	-	7
Vladilovci	47	47	-	-	-	-	-	-	-
Vojnica	11	4	1	-	-	-	-	-	6

== Economy ==
Livestock breeding and agriculture are the main branches of production. Mountainous areas are ideal for livestock breeding, where there are a large number of registered breeders.

Many residents are engaged in the production of tobacco, as well as the production of barley, corn and rice, which has grown along the Topolka River. The well-known mountain potato is cultivated in the areas of the villages of Gorno Jabolčište, Dolno Jabolčište, Drenovo and Papradište. Gorno Vranovci is known for chestnuts, while trout grow in Goložinca and Nežilovo.

In 2010 in Gorno Jabolčište was held the first event with a competitive character which gathered potato growers.

There has been an increase in tourism in the municipality recently. In 2008, there were 25% more tourists than the year before. Besides domestic tourists, there are now also visitors from Poland, Serbia, Slovenia, Croatia, Czech Republic and Slovakia.

== Settlements and infrastructure ==
The largest settlement in the Municipality of Čaška is Gorno Jabolčište with over 2,400 inhabitants. Recent years have seen more infrastructure commitments and investments. In 2012 the villages Gorno Jabolčište and Dolno Jabolčište were for the first time ever connected to a paved road.

Generally today there is good road connectivity in the municipality. The municipality is connected to City of Veles through a regional road. The Skopje-Bitola train railway also passes through its territory. It is also foreseen the connection to the highway Veles-Prilep-Bitola, which will improve the territorial connection with other parts of the state.

There is no good network of health institutions in the municipality. There are only 6 ambulances in the settlements: Čaška, Melnica, Izvor, Bogomila, Gorno Jabolčište and Dolno Jabolčište, as well as two dental clinics in Čaška and Gorno Jabolčište. There is a specialized clinic for lung diseases in the village of Jasenovo, which the population in the surrounding settlements uses as an ambulance.

The citizens of the Municipality of Čaška are only partially supplied with drinking water through the water supply system built with local self-contribution and voluntary work, own wells and village fountains. Through the water supply network, 22 settlements are supplied with drinking water, while the other 20 settlements are supplied through alternative own sources.

== Education ==
There are no high schools in the Municipality of Čaška, with the nearest in the city of Veles. Instruction in Albanian has been conducted since the 2008/2009 school year.

The municipal council voted for the opening of the classroom with teaching in Albanian at Todor Janev Primary School in Čaška. Supporting this decision were 7 out of 11 councilors. A day earlier, a certain group of Macedonian parents protested against the opening of Albanian-language classroom and boycotted of the lesson.
