= Gorno Jabolčište =

Gorno Jabolčište Горно Јаболчиште Katund i Epërm
- Village
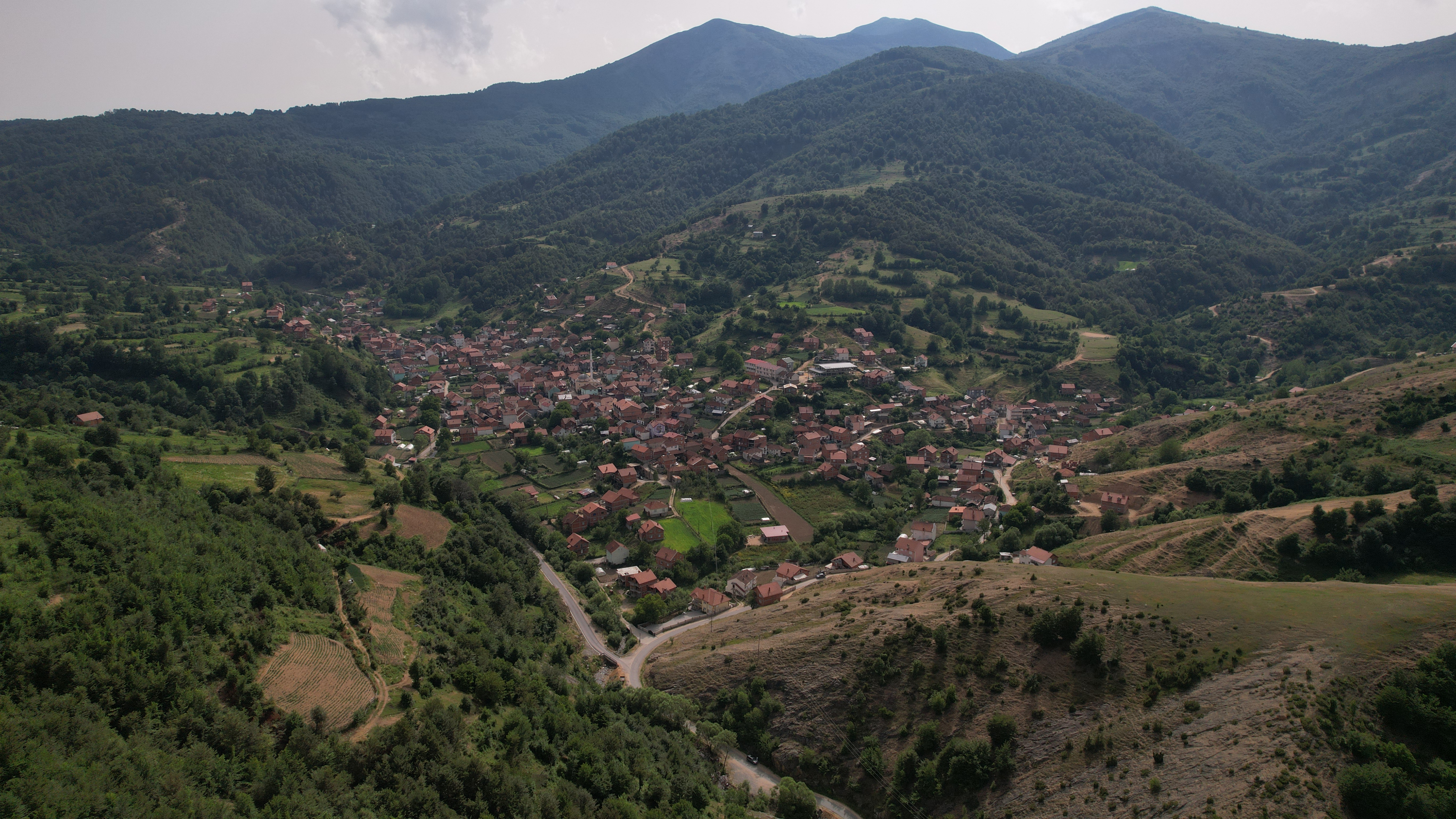
- Air view of the village

- Location within North Macedonia
- Coordinates: 41°43′N 21°29′E
- Country: Republic of North Macedonia
- Municipality: Čaška municipality
- Statistical region: Vardar Statistical Region

Population (2021)
  - Total: 2,444
- Time zone: UTC+1 (CET)
  - Summer (DST): UTC+2 (CEST)
- Car plates: VE
- Website: .

Gorno Jabolčište (Macedonian: Горно Јаболчиште, Albanian: Katund i Epërm) is a village in the municipality of Čaška, North Macedonia.

== History ==
Like other villages in Čaška, both Macedonian and Albanian, the village was founded by families from various villages from the western regions near Debar and Luma, in particular Sence, Strezimir, Vrbjani and Dabovo in Upper Reka.

== Demographics ==
According to the 2002 census, the village had a total of 2.444 inhabitants. Ethnic groups in the village include:

- Albanians 2.401
- Others 33

Year	Macedonian	Albanian	Turks	Romani	Vlachs	Serbs	Bosniaks	Others	Total
2002	...	1.727	...	...	...	...	...	14	1.741
2021	...	2.401	...	...	...	...	...	33	2.444
