= Dolno Jabolčište =

Dolno Jabolčište Долно Јаболчиште Katund i Poshtëm
- Village
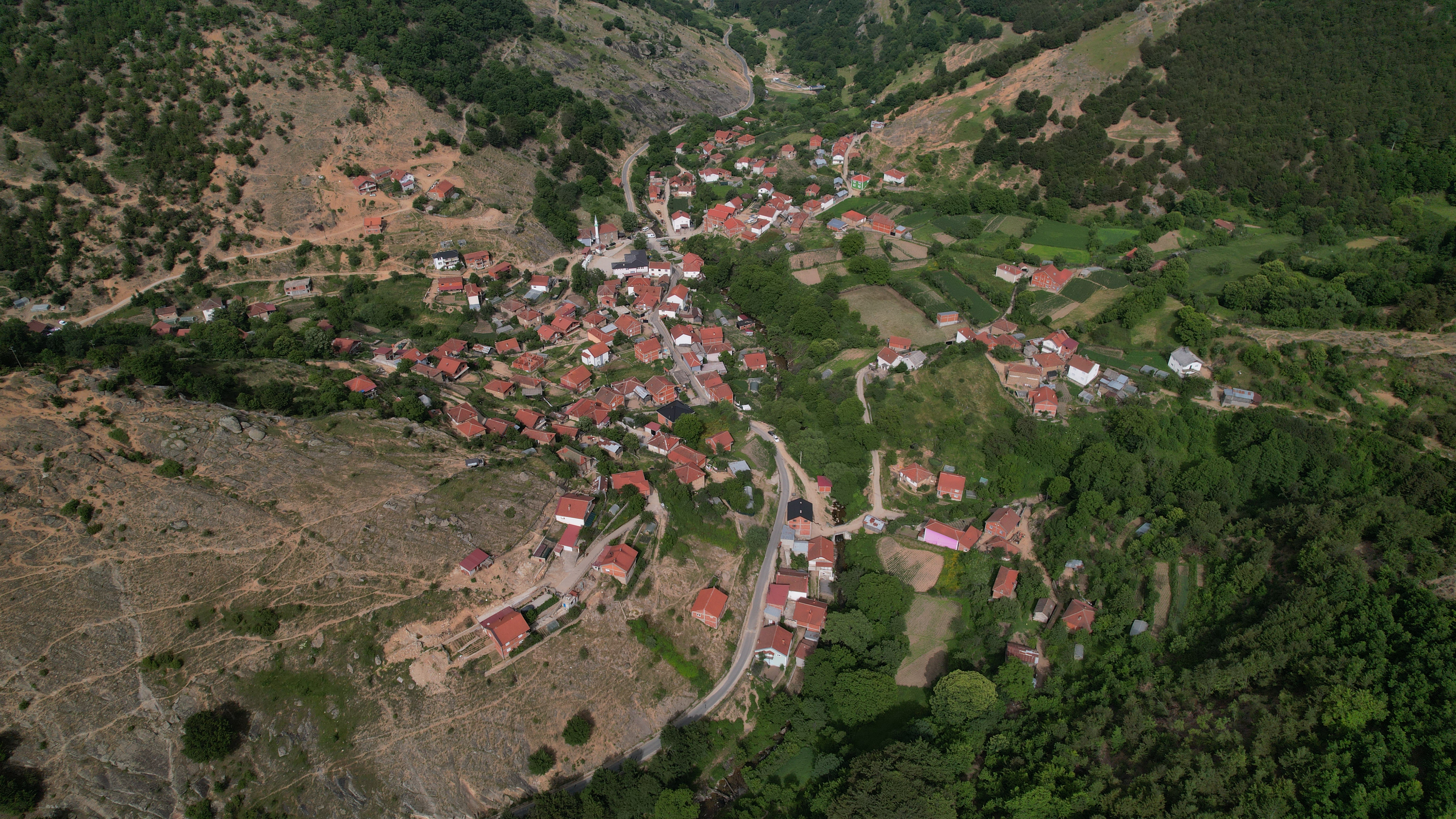
- Air view of the village

- Location within North Macedonia
- Coordinates: 41°44′N 21°31′E
- Country: Republic of North Macedonia
- Municipality: Čaška municipality
- Statistical region: Vardar Statistical Region

Population (2021)
  - Total: 1,047
- Time zone: UTC+1 (CET)
  - Summer (DST): UTC+2 (CEST)
- Car plates: VE
- Website: .

Dolno Jabolčište (Macedonian: Долно Јаболчиште, Albanian: Katund i Poshtëm) is a village in the municipality of Čaška, North Macedonia.

== History ==
Like other villages in Čaška, both Macedonian and Albanian, the village was founded by families from various villages from the western regions near Dibra/Debar and Luma, in particular Upper Reka.

== Demographics ==
According to the 2021 census, the village had a total of 1.047 inhabitants. Ethnic groups in the village include:

- Albanians 1021
- Bosniaks 1
- Others 25

Year	Macedonian	Albanian	Turks	Romani	Vlachs	Serbs	Bosniaks	Others	Total
2002	...	716	...	...	...	...	...	2	718
2021	...	1.021	...	...	...	...	1	25	1.047
