= Bogomila =

Bogomila Богомила
- Village
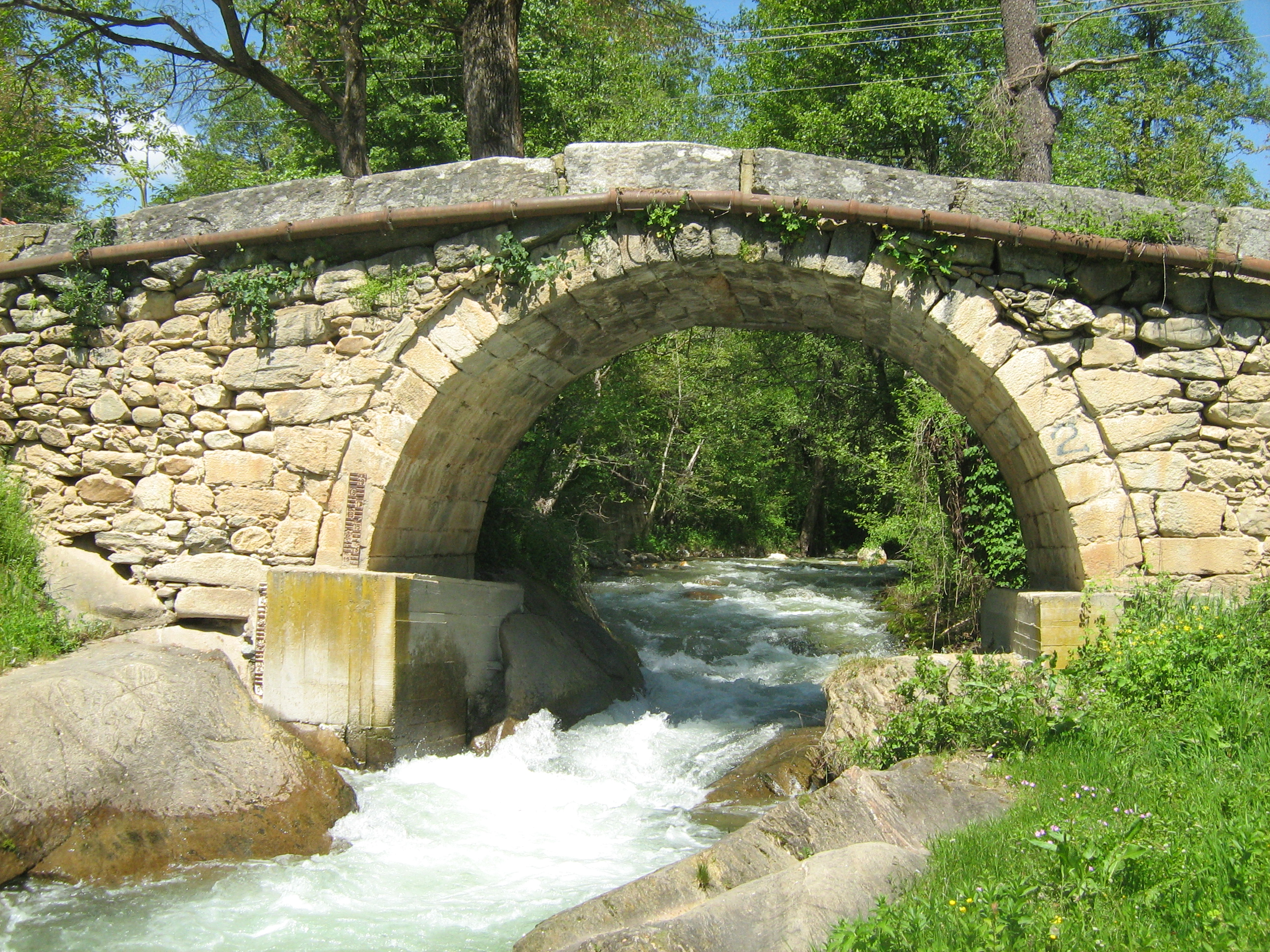
- A Roman bridge on the river Babuna

- Location within North Macedonia
- Country: North Macedonia
- Region: Vardar
- Municipality: Čaška

Population (2021)
  - Total: 359
- Time zone: UTC+1 (CET)
  - Summer (DST): UTC+2 (CEST)
- Website: .

Bogomila (Macedonian: Богомила) is a village in the municipality of Čaška, North Macedonia. It is located in the central part of the North Macedonia, close to the city of Veles and it used to be a municipality of its own.

== Demographics ==
On the 1927 ethnic map of Leonhard Schulze-Jena, the village is written as "Bogumil" and shown as a Serbianized Bulgarian Christian village. According to the 2021 census, the village had a total of 359 inhabitants. Ethnic groups in the village include:

- Macedonians 319
- Persons for whom data are taken from administrative sources 32
- Albanians 3
- Serbs 1
- Others 33

Year	Macedonian	Albanian	Turks	Romani	Vlachs	Serbs	Bosniaks	Others	Persons for whom data are taken from admin. sources	Total
2002	471	2	1	...	...	1	...	1	n/a	476
2021	319	3	...	...	...	1	...	4	32	359

== Notable people ==
- Internal Macedonian Revolutionary Organization founder and revolutionary Petar Poparsov
