= Leonhard Schultze-Jena =

German explorer, zoologist, and anthropologist

- Born: May 28, 1872; Jena, German Empire
- Died: March 28, 1955 (aged 82); Marburg, West Germany

Academic work
- Discipline: Zoology; Anthropology

Leonhard Sigmund Friedrich Kuno Klaus Schultze-Jena (May 28, 1872, in Jena – March 28, 1955, in Marburg) was a German explorer, zoologist, and anthropologist known for his explorations of German Southwest Africa and New Guinea, as well as for his studies on Mesoamerican languages. During the Herero and Namaqua genocide, Schultze, a witness, took "body parts from fresh native corpses" which according to him was a "welcome addition". He also noted that he could use prisoners for that purpose.

In 1912, he adopted the surname Schultze-Jena from an honorary title that was given to his father, gynecologist and obstetrician Bernhard Sigmund Schultze.

The Leonhard Schultze River and Leonhard Schultze languages of Papua New Guinea are named after him, as well as three species of reptiles: Elseya schultzei, Monopeltis leonhardi, and Sphenomorphus schultzei.

== Publications ==
- Aus Namaland und Kalahari. Bericht an die königlich Preussische Akademie der Wissenschaften zu Berlin über eine Forschungsreise im westlichen und zentralen Südafrika in den Jahren 1903 – 1905, Jena 1907.
- Zoologische und anthropologische Ergebnisse einer Forschungsreise westlichen und zentralen Südafrika ausgeführt in den Jahren 1903–1905 mit Unterstützung der Kgl. Preussischen Akademie der Wissenschaften, Jena, Gustav Fischer, 1904.
- Zoologische und anthropologische Ergebnisse einer Forschungsreise im westlichen und zentralen Südafrika ausgeführt in den Jahren 1903 – 1905, Bd. 5: Zur Kenntnis des Körpers der Hottentotten und Buschmänner, in: Denkschriften der medizinisch- naturwissenschaftlichen Gesellschaft zu Jena, Bd.5 (3):Seiten 147–227, 1928
- Petermanns Geographische Mitteilungen, p. 324;
- Zeitschrift der Gesellschaft für Erdkunde zu Berlin 1909, Seiten 623–624;
- Zeitschrift der Gesellschaft für Erdkunde, Berlin 1910, Seiten 668–669;
- Zeitschrift der Gesellschaft für Erdkunde, Berlin 1911, Seiten 128, 361–365.
- Forschungen im Innern der Insel Neuguinea: Bericht des Führers über die wissenschaftlichen Ergebnisse der deutschen Grenzexpedition in das westliche Kaiser-Wilhelmsland 1910, Mittler, Berlin, 1914. (Digitalisat)
- in der Serie: Das deutsche Kolonialreich Bd. 2 T. 2., Südwestafrika, Bibliographisches Institut, Leipzig, 1914
- Schultze, Leonhard; Siegmund, Leonhard (1927). Makedonien: Landschafts- und Kulturbilder (in German). Jena: Gustav Fischer. OCLC 4529779.
- Quellenwerke zur alten Geschichte Amerikas, aufgezeichnet in den Sprachen der Eingeborenen. Vol. VI.
- Indiana I. Leben, Glaube und Sprache der Quiché von Guatemala, Gustav Fischer, Jena. 1933
- Indiana II: Mythen in der Muttersprache der Pipil von Izalco in El Salvador Gustav Fischer, Jena 1935
- Indiana III. Bei den Azteken, Mixteken und Tlapaneken der Sierra Madre del Sur von Mexiko, Jena, Gustav Fischer. 1938
- Der Wortschatz des Popol Vuh
- Popol Vuh – Das Heilige Buch der Quiché-Indianer von Guatemala, Stuttgart/Berlin: Kohlhammer 1944
- Gliederung des Alt-Aztekischen Volks in Familie, Stand und Beruf. Aus dem aztekischen Urtext Bernardino de Sahagún's. Übersetzt und Erläutertert von Dr. Leonhard Schultze Jena. Quellenwerke zur alten Geschichte Amerikas, aufgezeichnet in den Sprachen der Eingeborenen. Herausgegeben vom Ibero-Amerikanischen Institut Stuttgart, W. Kohlhammer, 1952, 336 Seiten.
- Traduccion Antonio Goubaud Carrera y Herbert D. Sapper in Biblioteca de cultura popular; Vol. 49: La vida y las crencias de los indígenas quichés de Guatemala Guatemala: Ed. del Ministerio de educación pública Centro ed. „José de Pineda Ibarra“, Guatemalacity, 1954
- Alt-aztekische Gesänge: Nach einer in der Biblioteca Nacional von Mexiko aufbewahrten Handschrift übersetzt und erläutert Hrsg. Leonhard Schultze. Nach seinem Tode hrsg. von Gerdt Kutscher
- Mitos y lenyendas de los pipiles de Iizalco Leonhard Schultze, Cáceres. 1982, San Salvador Tomo II

== See also ==
- Bernhard Sigmund Schultze
- Max Johann Sigismund Schultze
