= Battle of Vladilovci =

- Part of the Macedonian Struggle
Date	9 March 1907
Location	Vladilovci and surroundings, North Macedonia
Result	Serbian chetnik victory

Belligerents
Serbian Chetnik Organization	Internal Macedonian Revolutionary Organization	Ottoman Empire

Commanders and leaders
Gligor Sokolović; Jovan Babunski; Cene Marković; Vasilije Trbić; Boško Virjanac	Andon Kjoseto (POW)	Unknown

Strength
5 companies	33	Large garrison from Gornje Vranovac

Casualties and losses
1 dead and 1 wounded	23 dead and 8 POWs	(Ottoman Empire) c. 40 dead (Note: All that is known about ottoman casualties is that 10 palanquins were used to carry the dead bodies. Since a palanquin carries 4 dead bodies on average (see this page), we can assume the dead toll was around 40.)

The Battle of Vladilovci occurred between Serbian Chetniks, Macedonian committees (IMRO) and Ottoman forces on 9 March 1907, as part of the Macedonian Struggle.

== Battle ==
=== Fighting ===
On 9 March 1907, vojvodas Gligor Sokolović, Jovan Babunski, Cene Marković, Vasilije Trbić and Boško Virjanac were marching towards Vladilovci. Thinking that there were few Serbs, around 3 o'clock in the morning, the IMRO group of Andon Kjoseto attacked the chetniks. The Serbian dukes managed to slip through, unnoticed by the IMRO group and, from behind, they opened heavy fire. After 3–4 hours of fighting, the Ottoman military crew arrived from Gornje Vranovac, which immediately opened fire on Vladilovci. Both companies fired at the Turks, who, lay down and stopped firing. Meanwhile, the IMRO group was decimated, and the Ottoman army began to arrive from various directions for support. For this reason, a division was immediately sent to occupy the heights on Smilovački Vis and to secure a retreat for the Serbian groups by firing from there. After a short time, village companies from Pomenovo and Stepanac arrived to help the Chetniks. Because of this, the ottomans retreated due to heavy losses.

=== The result of the battle ===
The battle lasted over 12 hours. According to Vasilije Trbić, Andon Kjoseto was captured together with 7 other committees, but later released. All that is known about the Turkish losses is that 10 litters were hired to transport the dead and, because of this, we can estimate their death count to be around 40. According to the data of Serbian national workers from these regions, 31 were the total IMRO casualties: 23 dead and 8 captured. Serbian losses, instead, were much lower. 1 chetnik was killed (Nikola from Poreč) and 1 was wounded (Ćira former Serbian gendarme).
