= Mihail Apostolov =

Bulgarian army officer

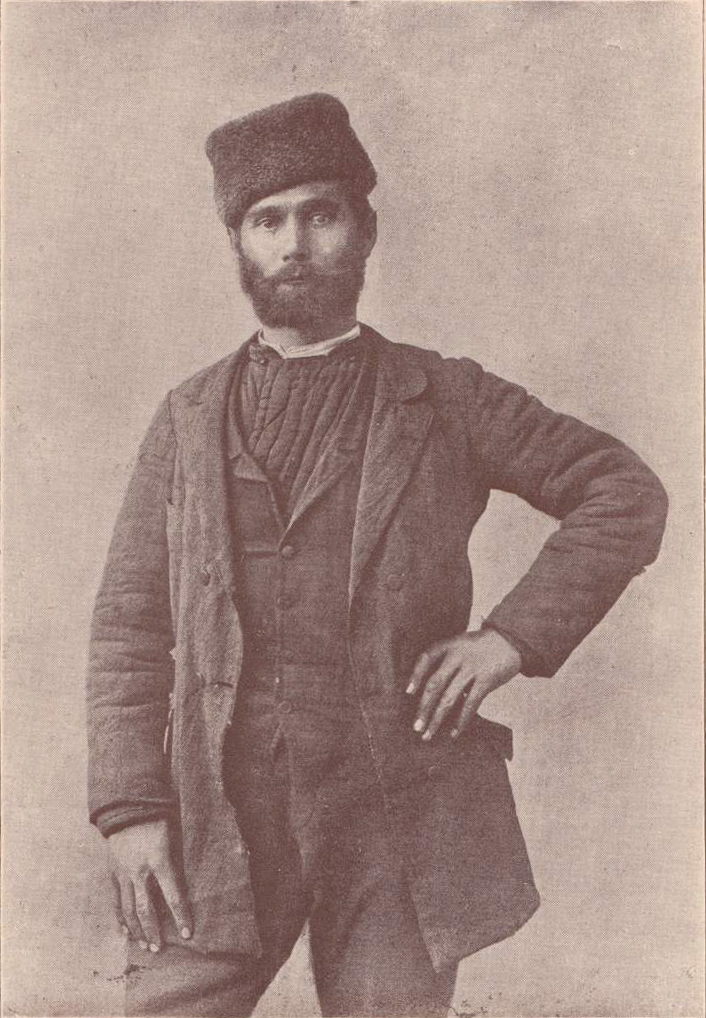
- Born: 1871; Gorna Dikanya, Ottoman Empire
- Died: March 21, 1902; Gavalyantsi, Ottoman Empire
- Organization: IMARO

Mihail Raynov Apostolov (Bulgarian: Михаил Райнов Апостолов; 1871 – March 21, 1902), also known as Mihal Postolov or Popeto, was an officer in the Bulgarian army and a worker of the Internal Macedonian-Adrianople Revolutionary Organization (IMARO).

== Biography ==
=== Early years ===
Mihail Apostolov was born in the village of Gorna Dikanya, Radomir region, in 1871. He was raised in a very poor family. After his mother died, his father sent him to Sofia to study. He served his military service in the cavalry, in the First Cavalry Regiment, and was promoted to the rank of a sergeant. He left the army and became a policeman in the Cavalry police in Sofia. In 1895, when the Macedonian Committee in Sofia organized a revolutionary action in Macedonia, he left his police service and joined the revolutionary band of lieutenant Petar Nachev. After the action, he returned to Sofia. He met Gotse Delchev, who at that time organized the first revolutionary bands of the IMARO, which had the goal of entering Macedonia. Gotse Delchev decided to attract Bulgarian army officers to the IMARO in order to raise the authority and prestige of the revolutionary organization before the population and to improve the military skills of the freedom fighters. Mihail Apostolov – Popeto, Marko Lerinski and Hristo Chernopeev were among the first Bulgarian army officers in the IMARO.

=== Years in the IMARO ===
Mihail Apostolov became the first leader of a revolutionary band for agitation and organization. During his 7 years of activities, a number of IMARO freedom fighters joined his revolutionary band as his trainees, such as: Mihail Gerdzhikov, Nikola Dechev, Petar Yurukov, Delcho Kotsev, Petar Samardzhiev, Nikola Zhekov, Atanas Babata, Andon Kyoseto (who was an assistant-leader of the band), Krastyo Balgariyata, Gone Beginin, Trayko Gyotov, Ivan Varnaliyata, Ivan Alyabaka and others. Mihail Apostolov also had Hristo Chernopeev in his band for 3–4 months, but Chernopeev later headed his own revolutionary band.

He entered Macedonia for the first time as an IMARO voyvoda in 1897. His revolutionary band had 7 freedom fighters. All of them were born in the liberated parts of Bulgaria and had military training: Vasil Ivanov Chochov – senior sergeant from the First Infantry Regiment, Aleksandar Marinov from Plovdiv – a student from the Non-commissioned Office School, Filip Grigorov - a student from the same school, Nikolay Petrov – non-commissioned officer and others. This revolutionary band was mainly active in the region of Maleshevo, but was also active in the regions of Kočani, Radoviš and Strumica.

On July 20, 1897, together with the Gotse Delchev's revolutionary band, he killed four Circassians in the village of Buykovtsi. On September 14, 1897, Mihail Popeto kidnapped the rich Nazam bey from Strumica. In 1898, Popeto’s band had 13 freedom fighters and operated in the regions of Serres and Kukush. In 1899, Mihail Popeto moved to the regions of Voden and Yenice-i Vardar. Mihail Chakov, a teacher, who was a freedom fighter in Mihail Popeto's band, headed different bands in Macedonia from 1901 to 1908. In February 1900, Mihail Popeto and his band, then composed of 15-20 freedom fighters, passed through the villages of Orizartsi, Gevgeli region, and later in the summer the band transferred to the region of Kukush. He had battles against Turkish military forces near the village of Dambovo, in Kožuf Mountain, as well as in other places. The same year, he continued to operate in the region of Tikveš.

On its way from the region of Kukush to the region of Petrich, on March 21, 1902, the band of Mihail Apostolov was overtaken by a strong Turkish pursuit band. A battle occurred between the villages of Chuguntsi and Gavalyantsi, Kukush region, in which Mihail Popeto died. He was buried in the garden of the church in Gavalyantsi.

== Additional references ==
- Енциклопедия България, том 1, Издателство на БАН, София, 1978.
- Спомени на Христо Чернопеев, Движението отсамъ Вардара и борбата съ върховиститѣ, Л. Милетичъ
- За Михаил Апостолов - Попето
- "Илюстрация Илинден", година VII, брой 6
- "Македония в пламъци", ИК Синева София, 2003 г.
