= Karel Anton Hošek =

Czech Republic adventurer and revolutionary

- Born: 1871; Prague, Austro-Hungary
- Died: 24 February 1907 (aged 35–36); Vladilovci, Ottoman Empire

Karel Anton Hošek was a Czech adventurer and revolutionary, a voivod (captain) in the Internal Macedonian Revolutionary Organization who operated in the Tikveš region. He is known as Anton Cheha (Anton the Czech) in Bulgaria.

== Biography ==
Hošek was born in Prague, then part of Austro-Hungary. He went to Bulgaria to participate in the uprising against the Ottoman Empire, joining the Internal Macedonian Revolutionary Organization. Later, together with Austrian revolutionary Rudolf Goliat he joined the Kriva Palanka cheta, led by Petar Angelov. In April 1906, Hošek joined the Tikveš cheta, led by voivod Dobri Daskalov, where Hošek would later be promoted himself to voivod and form his own cheta. In February 1907, Daskalov's and Hošek's chetas fought a battle in Veles against the Serbian Chetniks. On February of that same year, in conjunction with a cheta from the Prilep area they surrounded an 80-strong Serbian cheta near Vladilovci, Azot. In the resulting skirmish Hošek and 2 of his chetniks died.
