= Andon Kyoseto =

Bulgarian revolutionary (1855–1953)

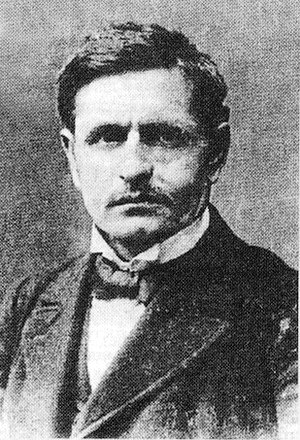
- A photograph of Andon Kyoseto
- Born: 1855; Golozinci, Ottoman Empire
- Died: 10 September 1953 (aged 97–98); Blagoevgrad, Bulgaria
- Organization: IMARO

Andon Lazov Yanev (Bulgarian: Андон Лазов Янев; 1855 – 10 September 1953), nicknamed Kyoseto, was a Bulgarian revolutionary and a member of the Internal Macedonian-Adrianople Revolutionary Organization (IMARO). His persona has been controversial in North Macedonia, where he has been depicted as a mass murderer in the media, while other people have regarded him favorably.

== Biography ==
=== Early years ===
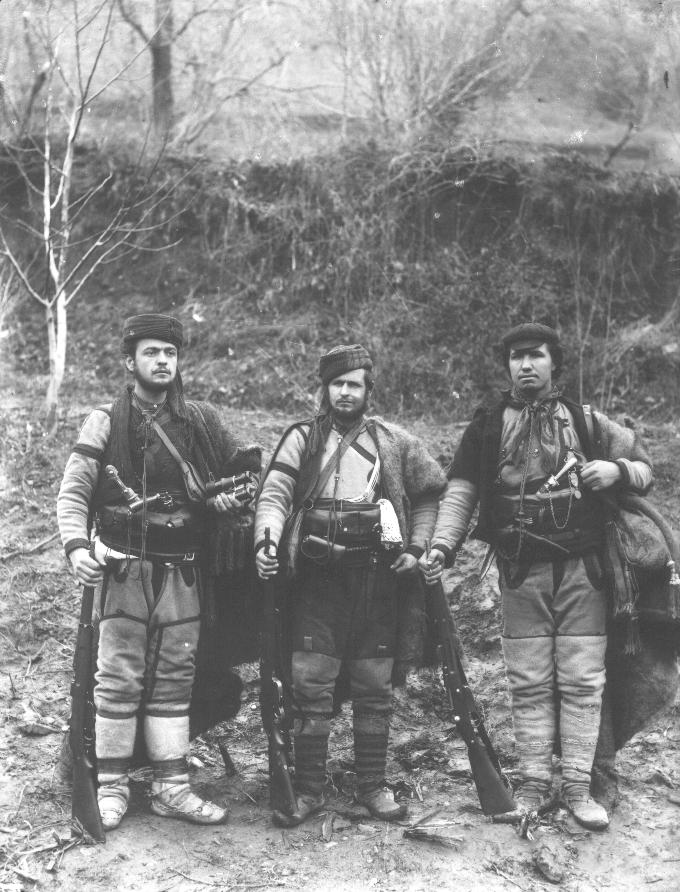
Andon Kyoseto (middle) and two fellow IMARO revolutionaries in the 1900s

Andon Kyoseto was born in 1855 in the village of Golozinci in the Ottoman Empire. Kyoseto did not go to school as there was no school in his village. He worked as a shepherd from an early age. His friends gave him the nickname Kyose. His father Lazo Yanev was a tenant farmer, while his mother Maria Yaneva was from the village Lisice. His father was imprisoned by the Ottomans for three years and the family moved to Veles. His father was released after serving his term and died a week after his release. The burden to provide for the family fell on his mother and uncle. His uncle sent Kyoseto to work as a servant for a family. Kyoseto attacked a Turk in self-defense and fled to Thessaloniki. After hearing about his arrival, Dame Gruev sent a representative to contact Kyoseto. Kyoseto was sworn into the Internal Macedonian-Adrianople Revolutionary Organization (IMARO) and his first assignment was to kill a Greek person, which he did. After a Turk insulted him and others in an establishment, Kyoseto ended up murdering him. He was brought in before Gruev, who scolded him for the murder and advised him not to act on his own. After that incident, he worked with direct instructions from Gruev.

In Thessaloniki, he was the cabman of the president of the Central Committee of IMARO, Hristo Tatarchev, earning an excuse for freedom of movement around the city. At that time, his brother Nikola, who came to Thessaloniki, placed himself in the service of the Ottoman authorities. Kyoseto arranged the killing of his brother at the hands of his associates. He also participated in the killing of the Serbian teacher Peychinovich in Thessaloniki. Kyoseto killed the pro-Greek and pro-Serbian Tsitso from Gevgelija. Kyoseto claimed that he and his men killed 30-40 Turkish and Romani charcoal burners in the vicinity of the village Huma, but the event has not been mentioned in memoirs of contemporaries, reports by authorities and diplomats. Per Vančo Gjorgjiev, Kyoseto made up the event in 1931 to impress the readers of his memoirs. During his stay in Sofia, he executed the orders of Gotse Delchev. In 1897, Kyoseto, Gotse Delchev and Mihail Apostolov Popeto kidnapped a bey from Strumica and held him for ransom, but the bey managed to escape. In November 1899, he and Popeto, along with their friends, killed a Patriarchist priest from Grčište. After the Valandovo affair in December 1899, he was appointed as a regional voivode in Gevgelija as Popeto had to move around as an instructor.

While working in the Strumica region in 1900, Yane Sandanski contacted him and advised him not to kill priests and teachers, who could be useful to the Organization, but to rely on intensive propaganda rather than terror. However, Kyoseto did not accept his advice, as Sandanski was not aware about the conditions in Macedonia, and the two met and talked in person. His revolutionary band got arrested in Bulgaria in 1902, but they were released. In 1902, he participated in the Miss Stone Affair, being tasked with securing the two kidnapped women and at the end freeing them. In February, he released the women near the village Gradošorci. After the affair, Protestant missionary Henry House in Thessaloniki suspected Kyoseto of being a kidnapper.

=== Ilinden uprising and aftermath ===
During the Ilinden-Preobrazhenie Uprising, Gyorche Petrov tasked Kyoseto with the transportation of his detachment from Sofia to Prilep, which he managed to do so. On 17 October 1903, before leaving the village of Skačinci, Kyoseto and his band engaged in a battle on "Klepata" against Ottoman soldiers. Five insurgents were killed. The band managed to escape during the night. He and his band managed to arrive in Bulgaria in December.

In 1905, he attended the regular congress of the Serres revolutionary committee. Kyoseto had arrived in the Melnik area with the arrival of the Supremists, where he helped Sandanski organize an ambush against Captain Yordan Stoyanov and his Supremist detachment in April 1905. In 1906, Kyoseto met and married a widow from Kocherinovo. She had a house, money, fields and livestock. From then on, he started to engage in agriculture, hiring an apprentice to plow his fields, hiring a shepherd, and having his own horse and hunting rifle. Although he officially distanced himself from the movement, Kyoseto still maintained ties with Sandanski and his supporters. He had his last meeting with them in Dupnitsa, shortly before the assassination of Boris Sarafov and Ivan Garvanov. In connection with the double murder, Kyoseto was also arrested. He and Hristo Chernopeev were charged separately with the murder of two Supremists in Macedonia. However, Chernopeev was soon released. After being acquitted of the double murder, Kyoseto was charged with murdering a family from the village of Vrapča. It was the family of an elderly man named Spase, who married his daughter with a Turk, despite the Organization's ban on marrying Christian girls with Turks. On the orders of the Organization, Kyoseto and his detachment in the middle of the village killed Spase, his wife, daughter, and son-in-law. Kyoseto remained in prison for 11 months, spending six months in the central prison in Sofia, three months in Kyustendil, and the rest of the time in Dupnitsa. Kyoseto was kept under strict supervision in prison, during which he was not allowed visits and mail from anyone. His wife was compelled to sell off part of her property to cover the expenses for his release. After the Young Turk Revolution, Kyoseto contacted Sandanski through Nikola Maleshevski. Sandanski obtained a certificate from the Young Turks that Kyoseto was not a "bandit" but a "revolutionary". Based on this document, Kyoseto, who was probably charged under the "Banditry Act", was acquitted of the charges and released. After his release, Kyoseto went to Kocherinovo, where he devoted himself to agricultural activities on his wife's property. Bulgarian authorities kept track of him for a year.

=== Balkan Wars and aftermath ===
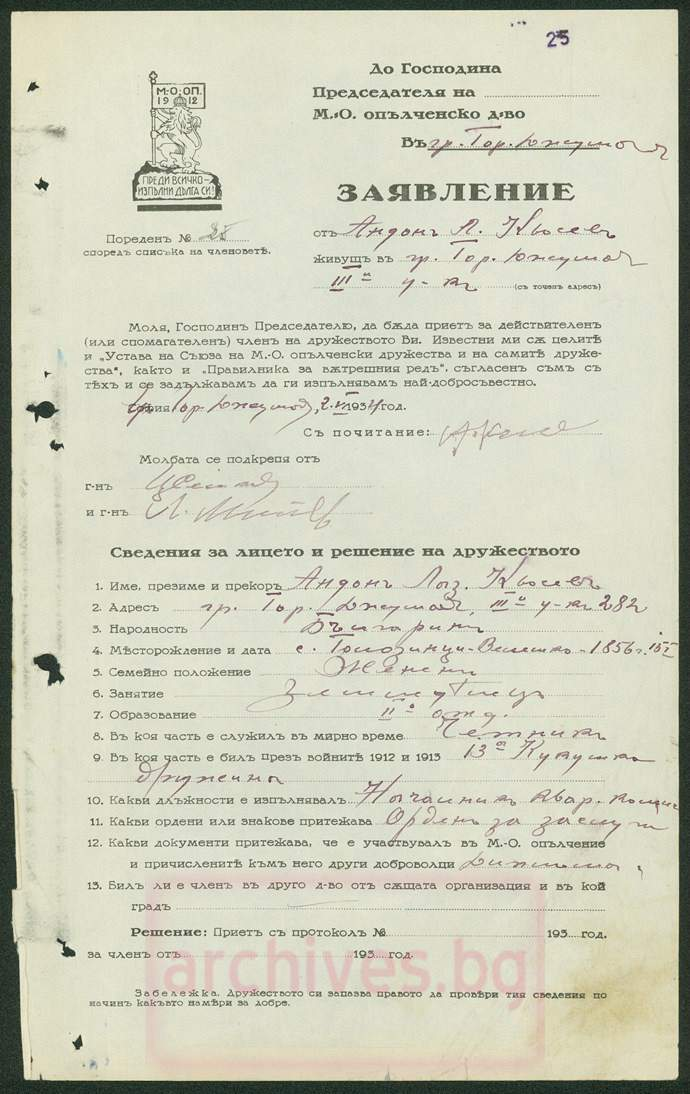
Application by Kyoseto for membership in the Macedonian-Adrianopolitan Volunteer Corps Society in Gorna Dzhumaya (1934).

In October 1912, detachments commanded by him and others, had freed Bansko. In the Balkan Wars, Kyoseto served in the headquarters of the 13th Kukush Bataillon of the Macedonian-Adrianopolitan Volunteer Corps and was in Stefan Chavdarov's detachment. After the First World War, Kyoseto settled in Gorna Dzhumaya (modern Blagoevgrad). In 1934 he became a member of the Macedonian-Adrianopolitan Volunteer Corps Society in Gorna Dzhumaya.

=== After the Second World War ===
After the Second World War, the Yugoslav and Bulgarian leaders Josip Broz Tito and Georgi Dimitrov worked on a project to merge their two countries into a Balkan Communist Federation. Bulgarian authorities agreed to the recognition of a distinct Macedonian ethnicity and language among parts of the Bulgarian population. Center of such events was the town of Gorna Dzumaya, where Kyoseto lived at that time. On 23–24 May 1948, in Skopje, the second congress of the People's Front of Macedonia was held, at which the President of the Socialist Republic of Macedonia Lazar Koliševski delivered a speech. On 9 June 1948, Kyoseto sent a greeting telegram to Koliševski where he expressed his hope that Macedonian people will "soon live, once and for all, under one roof".

After the Tito–Stalin split in the same year, the Bulgarian Communist Party accused the Yugoslav and Macedonian authorities of anti-Marxist and nationalist politics, and being antagonistic towards the Bulgarian people, ending the mandatory teaching of the Macedonian language. The Yugoslav government submitted in 1951 a memorandum to the United Nations, where the population in Bulgarian Macedonia was declared a "Yugoslav Macedonian minority", persecuted and terrorized by the Bulgarian authorities. Many old IMRO revolutionaries and their relatives as Georgi Pophristov, Dimitar Zaneshev, Lazar Tomov, Dimo Hadzhidimov's wife Alexandra Hadzhidimova, Vasil Chekalarov's wife Olga Chekalarova, Andon Kyoseto etc., declared themselves in a special petition against these Yugoslav claims. On 10 September 1953, he died in Blagoevgrad.

== Legacy ==
His memoirs were written down by Boyan Mirchev in September 1931 in Gorna Dzhumaya, where Mirchev came into contact with Kyoseto with the help of the Macedonian National Committee in Sofia. Mirchev published individual fragments of his memoirs immediately after their writing in 1931/1932 in the magazine Rodina. The following year, 1933, on the occasion of the thirtieth anniversary of the death of Gotse Delchev, Mirchev published the fragment of his memoirs that concerns the kidnapping of a bey in Gocev List. In the Socialist Republic of Macedonia, he was regarded as "anti-Macedonian" and excluded from historiography. For the 65th anniversary of the Ilinden Uprising, in 1968, the fragment about the journey with Gyorche Petrov's detachment from Bulgaria to Prilep was published in Sofia. Another fragment of his memoirs was published in 1981. The complete memoirs were published in Bulgaria in 2003 for the 100th anniversary of the Ilinden Uprising, in the book titled Macedonia in Flames. In 2014, his memoirs were also published in Republic of Macedonia (now North Macedonia).

Until the placement of the monument honoring him in 2014, he was a marginal figure in the Macedonian historiography and an unknown person in North Macedonia. During the rule of VMRO-DPMNE, his persona was gradually built as a "symbol of the fight against traitors". Macedonian historian Vančo Gjorgjiev published the first book about him in the country in 2016. Macedonian academic and VMRO-DPMNE councillor Vlado Popovski described Kyoseto as a "mass murderer", "serial killer" and "liquidator". Some Macedonian historians, such as Vančo Gjorgјiev and Nikola Žežov, have criticized the diminishment of his image in the media. VMRO-DPMNE and then Macedonian prime minister Nikola Gruevski attempted to construct his persona as a national symbol through the placement of a monument in the capital, the commissioning of a new wax figure in the Museum of the Macedonian Struggle, and through the filming of a documentary film about him, which was broadcast on the public service during the election silence before the early parliamentary elections in December 2016. A trend of hate speech using his persona was initiated by VMRO-DPMNE in December 2016.

=== Monuments ===
==== Strumica monument ====
The first monument honoring him was placed in the city park of Strumica in 1978. It is a part of three piece monument platou, in which the author Boris Krstevski represented the trial of Nazlam (the son of the Bey of Strumica). Gotse Delcev is depicted in a dominant role, who has the final words in the trial and Kyoseto is carefully listening to his words. This monument was part of the manifestation, celebrating 75 years of the Ilinden Uprising.

==== Skopje monument ====
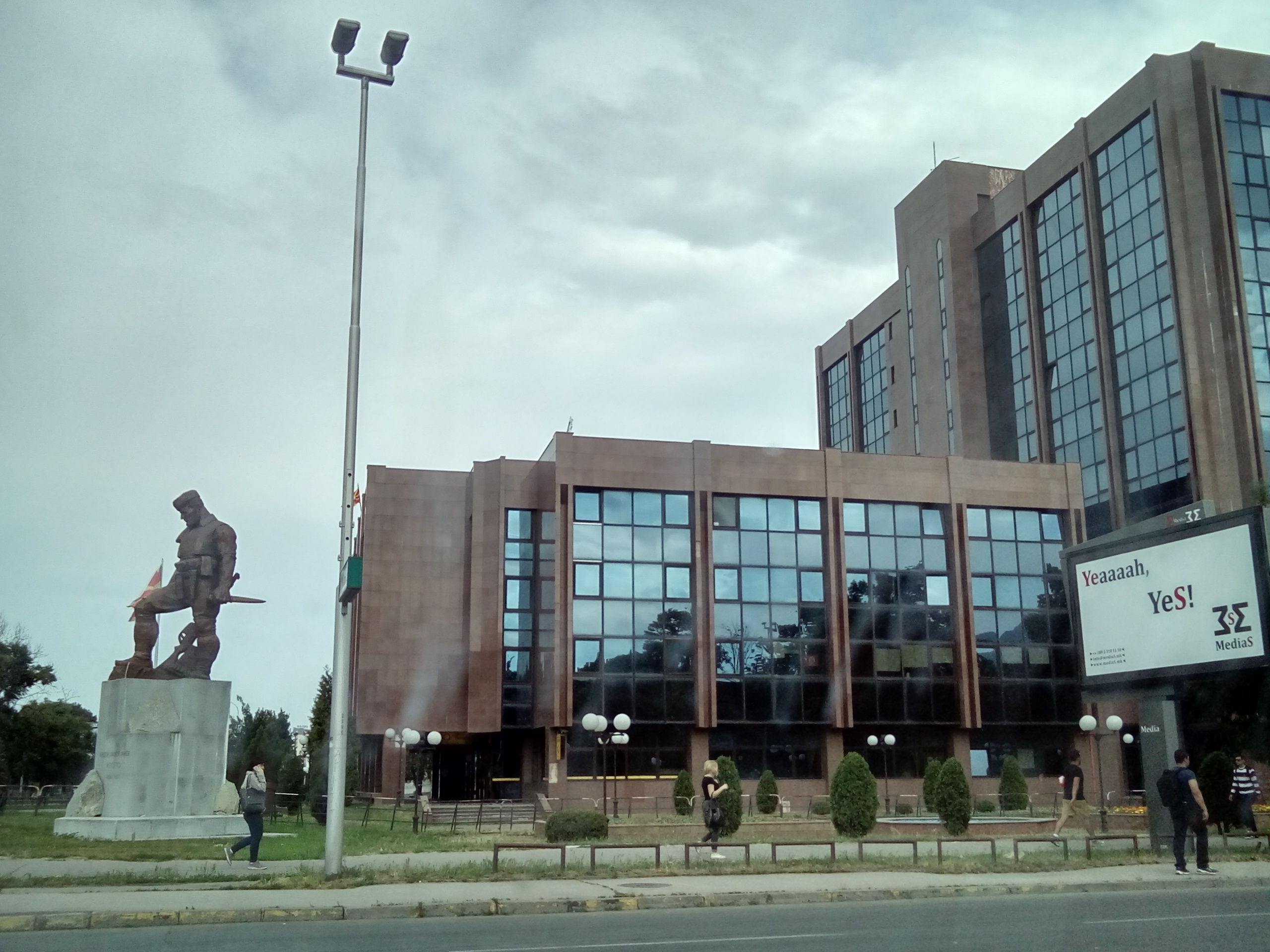
The Supreme Court in Skopje in 2015. On the left is the monument of Kyoseto, where it was placed

Between 6 and 7 September 2014 on the eve of Independence Day on 8 September, a monument honoring him was set up at the Supreme Court in Skopje as part of the Skopje 2014 project, donated by the Association for the Spiritual Unification of Setinci, Popadinci and Krushoradi. Kyoseto was described as a mass murderer in the media. The monument provoked controversies among the Macedonian public, with some people regarding him as a hero and others as a controversial killer. Popovski argued that a monument honoring him does not belong in Skopje as he does not have any deserved rank for the capital. On 22 February 2018, the monument was removed from the plateau in front of the Supreme Court as an illegal construction. This was one of the first steps in the successive removal of monuments from the project, a decision taken in 2017 by the new government of the country. The local government of the Municipality of Sopište considered requesting the monument for its municipality from the association which donated the monument. The monument was stored in a warehouse.

In April 2023, mayor of Skopje Danela Arsovska announced intentions to reinstate the monument. At the same time, the party The Left made an initiative for the return of his monument in the park in Gorno Lisiče, which was endorsed by the council of the Municipality of Aerodrom. In August 2023, Arsovska submitted an initiative for the return of the monument in a new location. Тhe proposal to return the monument was opposed by the Social Democratic Union of Macedonia, which regards Kyoseto as "one of the biggest murderers of the Macedonian people." In December 2023, the council of the City of Skopje approved the initiative to return the monument. The monument was returned on 28 July 2025 in front of a hotel.
