= Kočani medieval towers =

Medieval towers in Kočani, North Macedonia

Coordinates: 41.9213°N 22.4088°E

The Kočani medieval towers are located in Kočani, North Macedonia. According to legend, they were probably built in the second half of the 17th century, when the city was under Ottoman administration. The building has oriental styled architecture.

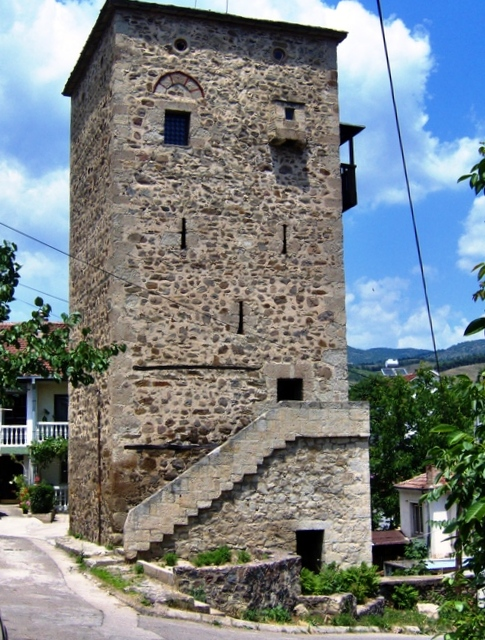
The medieval tower on the right bank of the Kočani river

In Kočani and its immediate surroundings, three medieval towers had been built, two of which are located in the city, situated on both banks of the Kočani river, while the third is located in the village of Dolni Podlog. They were used as the Ottoman bey's residential towers. The residential towers had a defensive position, and one of them was also used as a clock tower. It is located near the elementary school "Rade Kratovce" and served to indicate the hours by sound in earlier times.

Constructed of massive walls of stone, they have been left nowadays as signs of the past of Kočani. In 1957, the National Authority for Protection of Monuments put both towers under the protection of law.

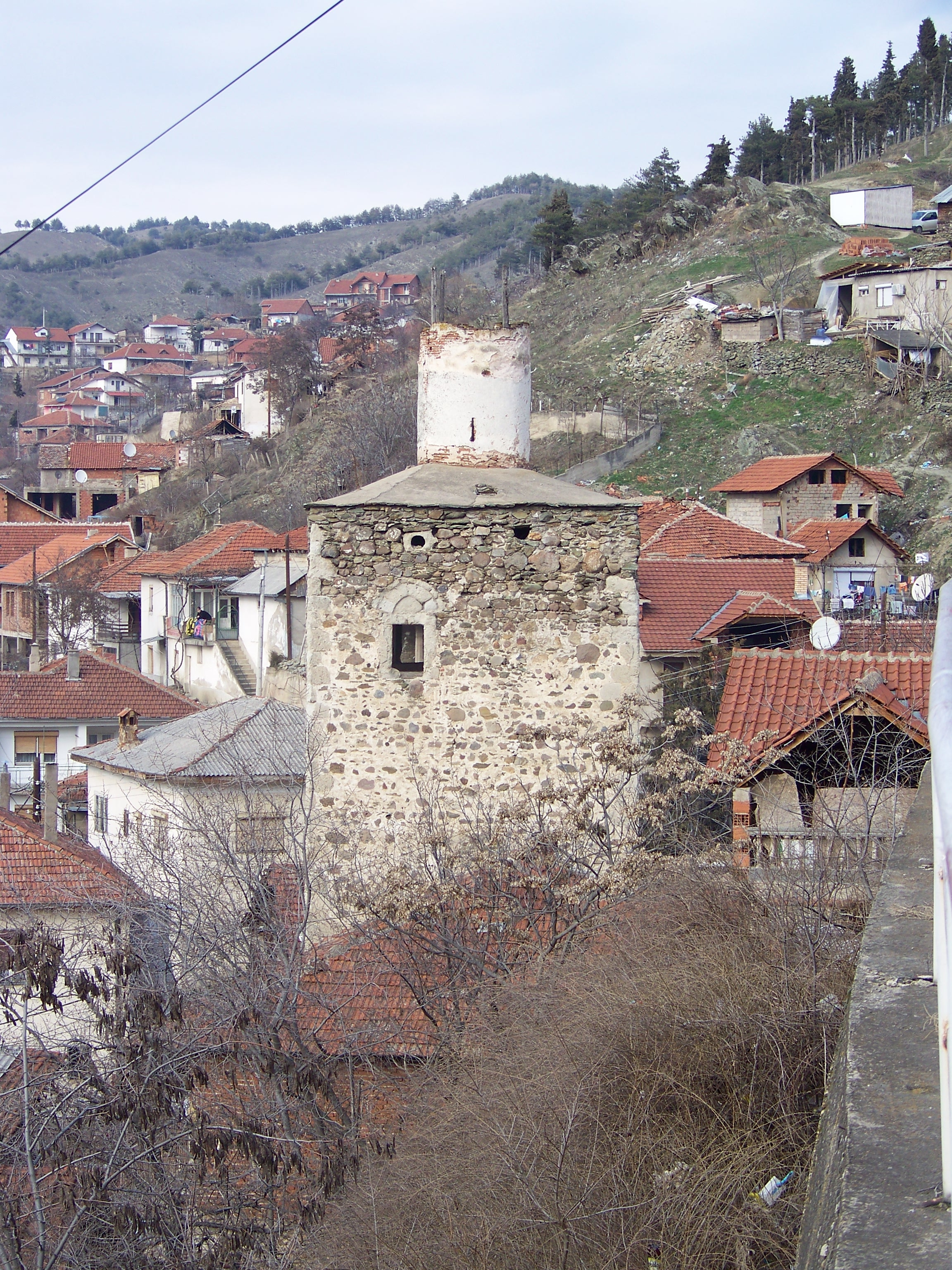
The medieval tower on the left bank of Kočani river

== Renovation and function ==
The medieval tower, located on the right bank of the river in the downtown area, situated between residential buildings, is dominant in space with its height by 18.5 meters. In 1978 the City Council made a decision for revitalization, after which the tower may be used again.

Current position of the tower:

- Basement - sanitation;
- Ground floor - numismatic collection;
- I floor - archaeological collection;
- II floor - library;

Unfortunately, the tower on the left side of the river has not been amended and is in poor condition. Currently it has no purpose.
