= Coat of arms of Kočani Municipality =

Coat of arms of Kočani

The coat of arms of Kočani Municipality has the form of golden (yellow) shield with a red head and a thin red frame. The shield is stylized with rice wheat of 3-2-1 and water surface marked by waves of 2-3-2, which represent a rice field.

At the head of the coat of arms is applied the special symbolism of Kočani – a geothermal spring and rice.
