= Dolno Gradište =

Dolno Gradište Долно Градиште
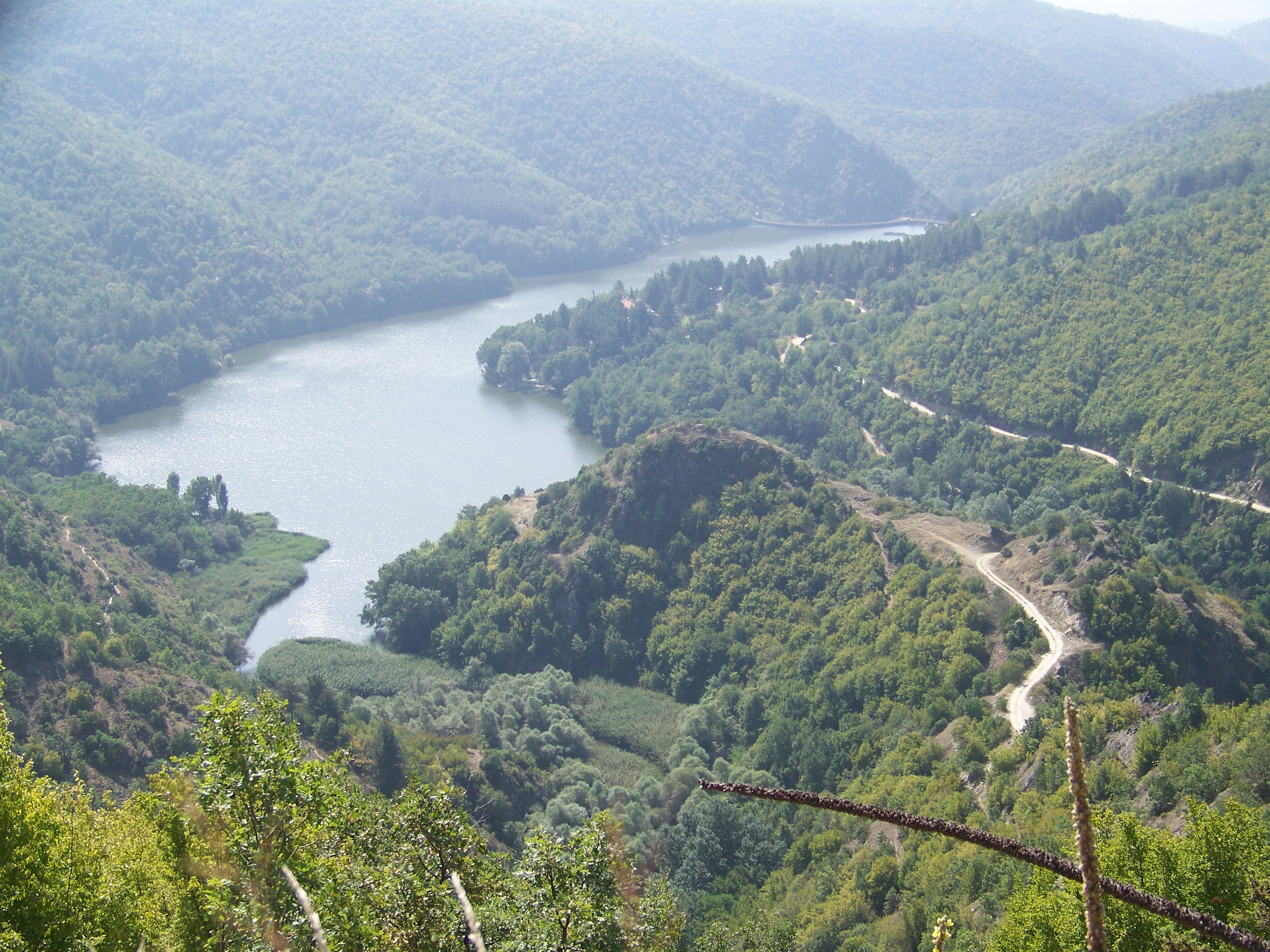
- Lake Gradče with Dolno Gradište location

- Location within North Macedonia
- Coordinates: 41°57′59″N 22°24′20″E
- Country: North Macedonia
- Municipality: Kočani
- Time zone: UTC+1 (CET)
  - Summer (DST): UTC+2 (CEST)
- Official language: Macedonian

Dolno Gradište (Macedonian: Долно Градиште) is a village in North Macedonia. It is located 6 kilometres north of Kočani, at the base of Mount Osogovo and at the northern coast of Lake Gradče. The site is situated on a prominent hill of the same name, located between the gorges of the Mala and Golema rivers which meet form the Kočani River. Many fortification remnants are found on the hill.

== History ==
In the early Antiquity, this area, which is geographically connected to the course of Bregalnica River or antic Astibos, was part of Paeonia, colonized by the Paeonian tribe known as the Derrones. During the Roman Period, reforms of the actual emperors concerning the administration led to minor state border changes. This is one reason the area was part of different provinces, such as Macedonia, Thracia, Macedonia Secunda, Dacia Mediteranea.

Balkan provinces gained importance to the Roman Empire towards the close of the 3rd and the 4th century A.D., when the Empire suffered great changes in the fields of economics, politics, and administration. At that time, the building of a new, strong defensive system in Macedonia commenced. Its main role was to protect the region from advancing northern tribes. Many remnants of that system can be seen even today.

The collapse of the local borders down the course of Bregalnica is associated with the close of Antique. This is the period when fortification and restoration of existing defensive walls of important settlements began. The site of Dolno Gradishte is one of those renewed settlements.

== Exploration ==
First written data about this site had been found in writings of the archaeologist M. Garashanin in 1959, and then, in 1964, A. Keramidchiev mentioned it in the writings about recognitions he had made throughout eastern part of Macedonia.

The excavations in 2004 were the first exploring activities with a purpose to prevent the site from the construction of the local road which connects Kočani to the village Jastrebnik. The fortification occupies an area of around 1,5 ha and has wide defensive walls that enclose an irregular form with dimensions of 200x100/50 meters. A high eastern acropolis with traces of medieval defensive tower dominates over a wide dwelling terrace, located eastern and southern of the acropolis. Many of the remnants found at the terrace are parts of the wall that followed the west side up to the north-western forehead, where remnants of another medieval defensive tower were found.

Many traces of objects used for living are located in the base of the east side of the north-western tower. Especially noteworthy is the fact that their base are built up in the cliff.

== Artifacts ==
The site is rich in constructional ceramics decorated with various engraved ornaments, while fragments with engraved horizontal and defending lines in many different variants prevail at the clay pottery. It is important to mention that medieval sgraffito plates and objects made of tilled animal bones were also found here.

Besides the pottery and the ceramics used for building, a great amount of slag was also discovered. The site `Zgurite` is close to this one and they used to be connected with an old antic path. This is one of the reasons why is believed that the site is an old mining settlement which is associated to the Osogovo region rich in mineral deposits.

The existence of necropolis near the fortification is just another prove of the constant settlement which was situated here.

== Gallery ==
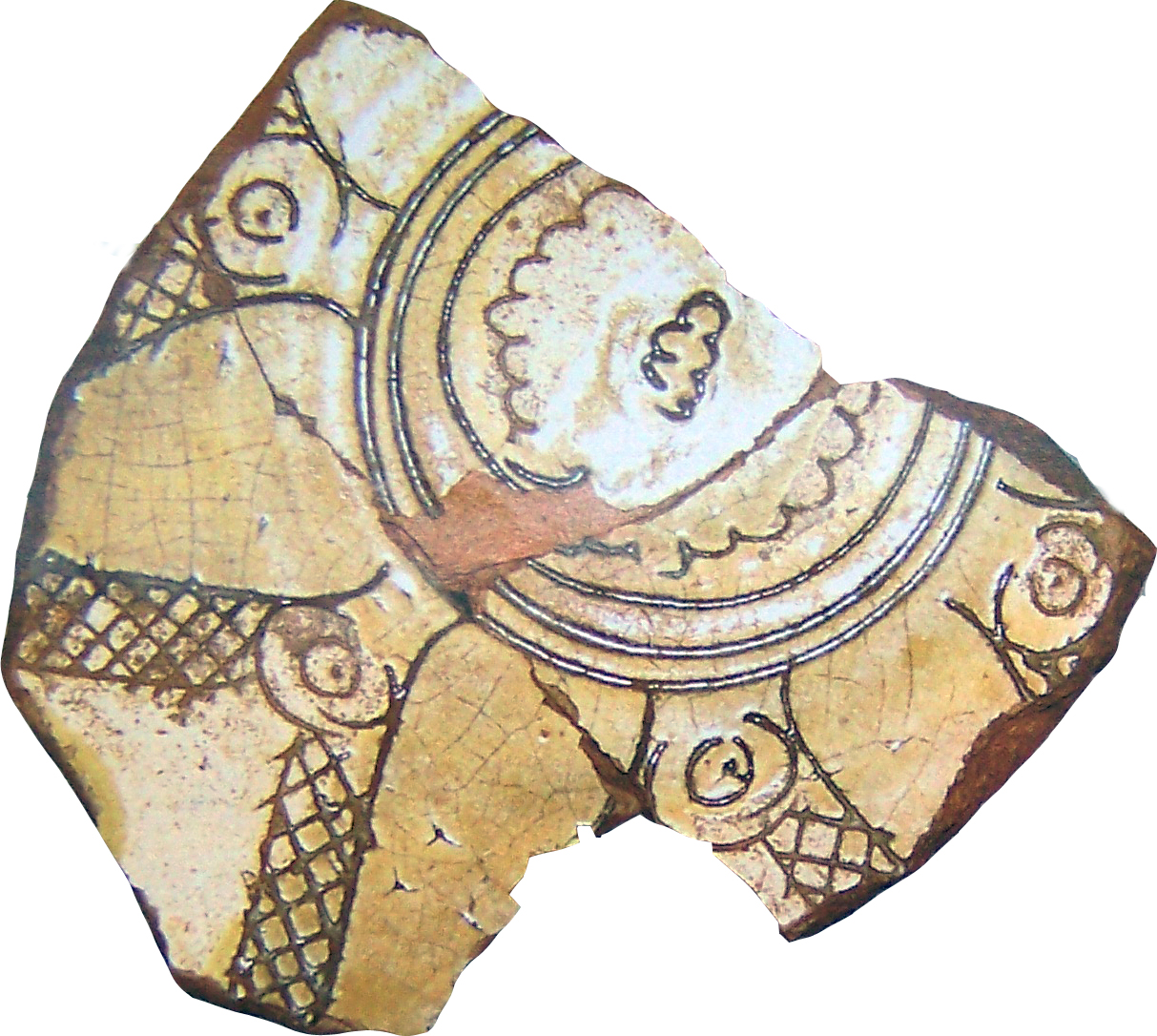
Sgraffito plate

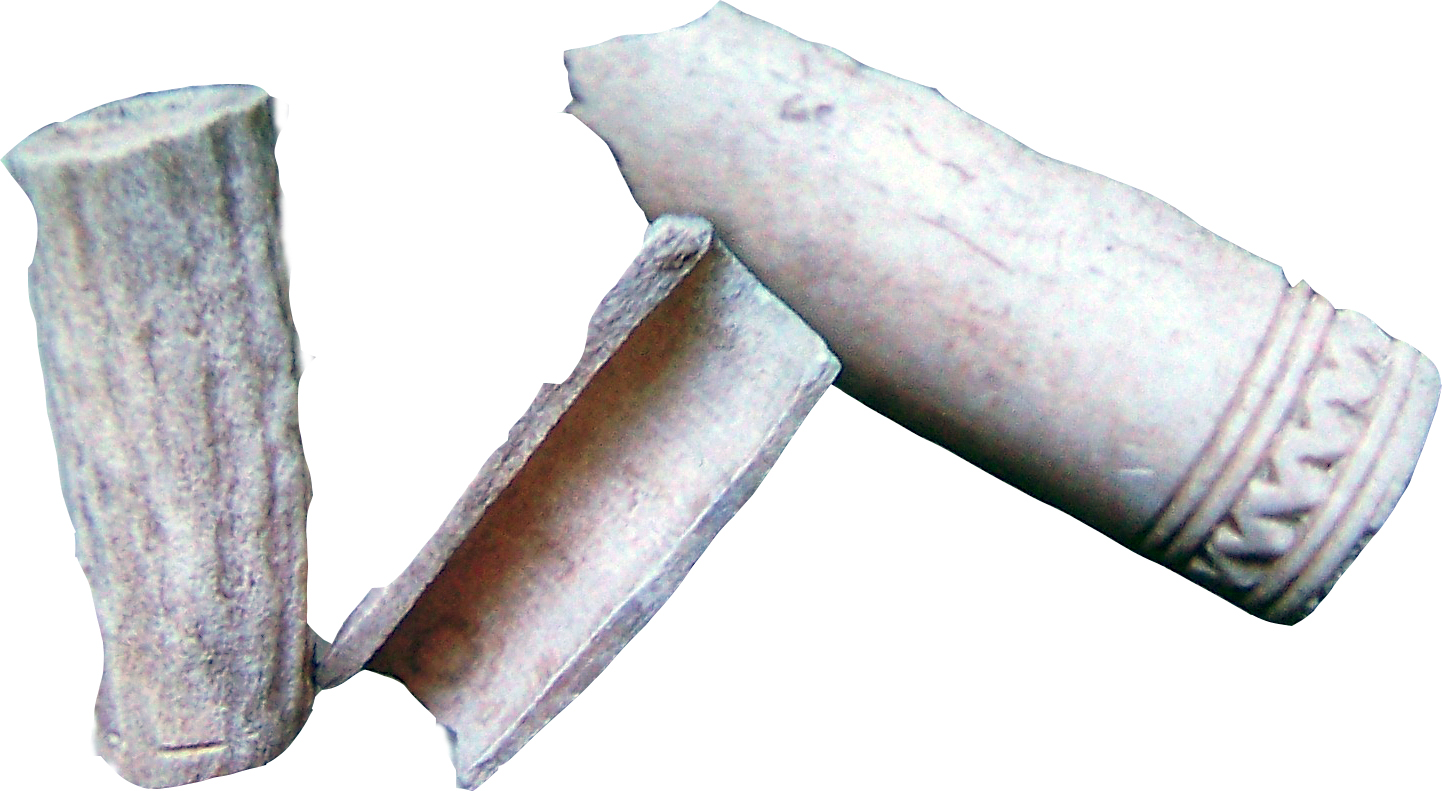
Tilled animal bones

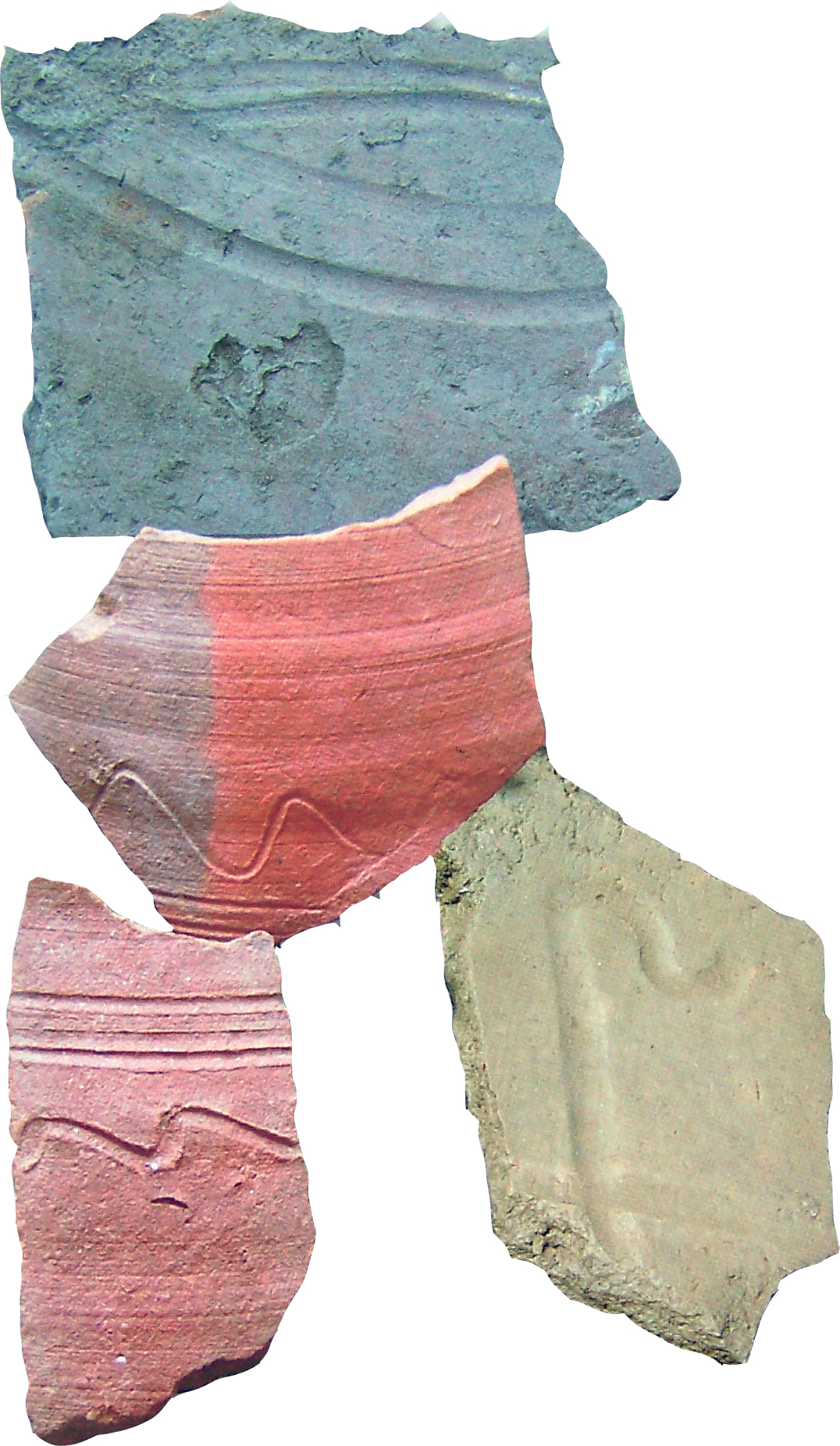
Constructional ceramics and clay pottery

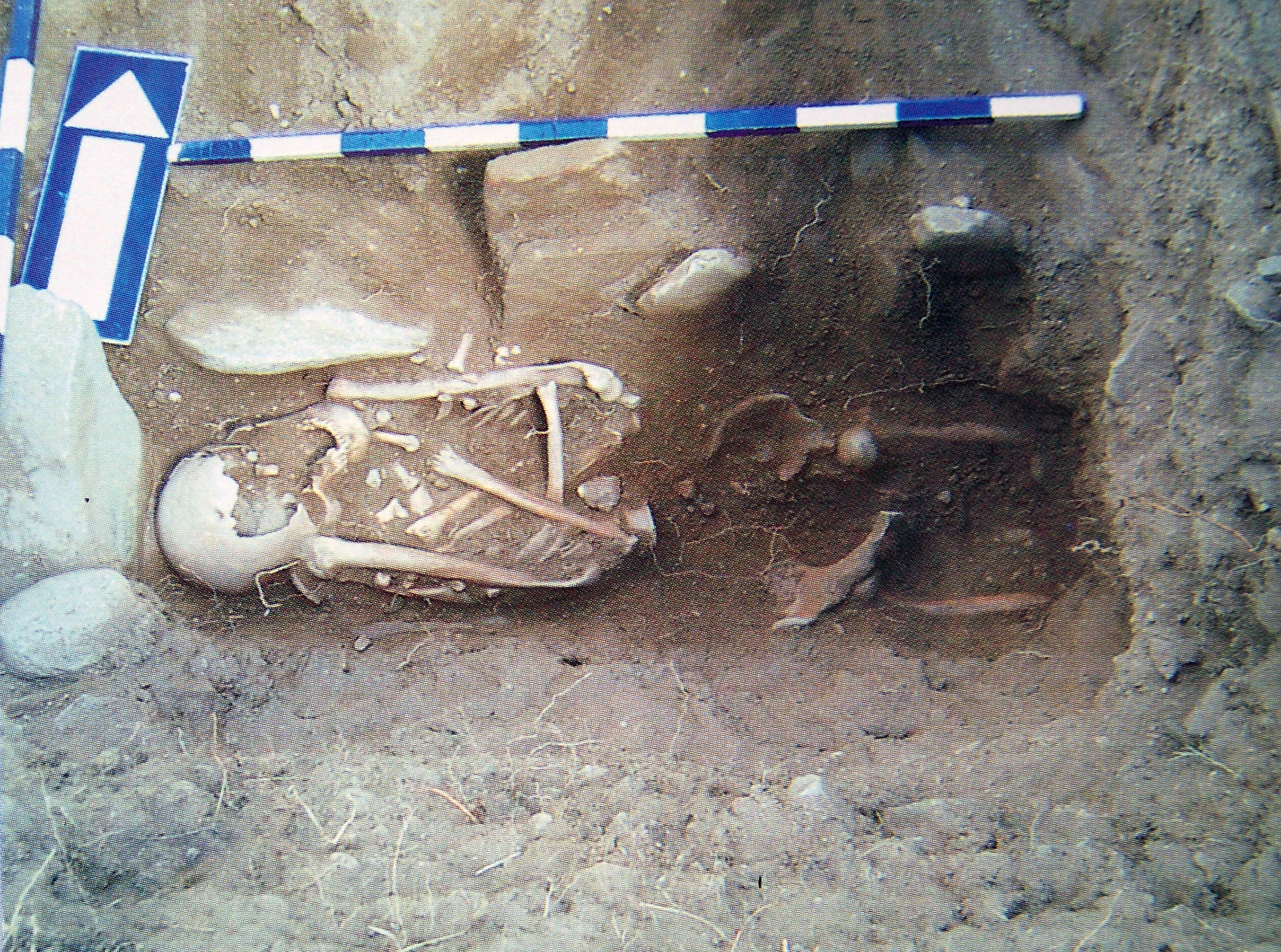
A tomb

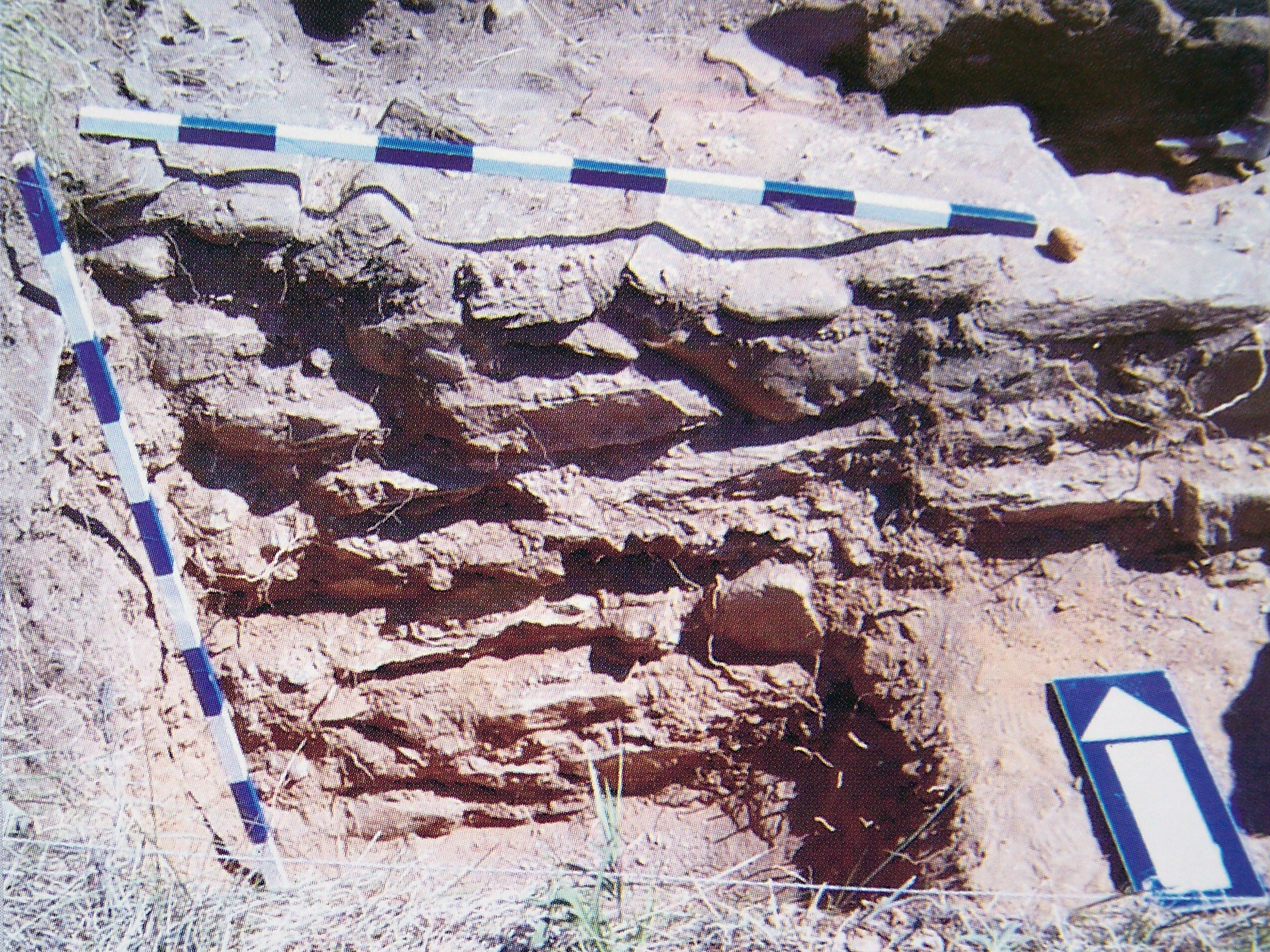
An object

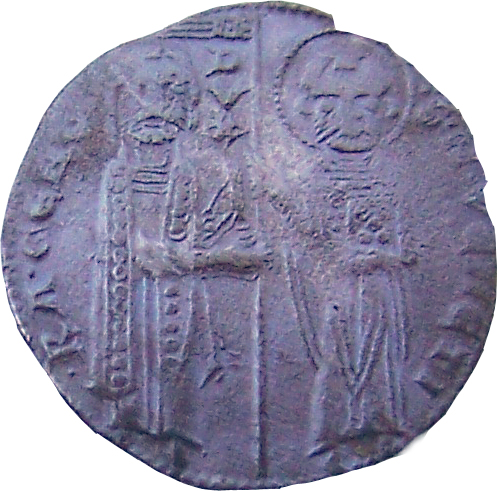
A coin by Ranieri Zena (1253–1268) - obverse

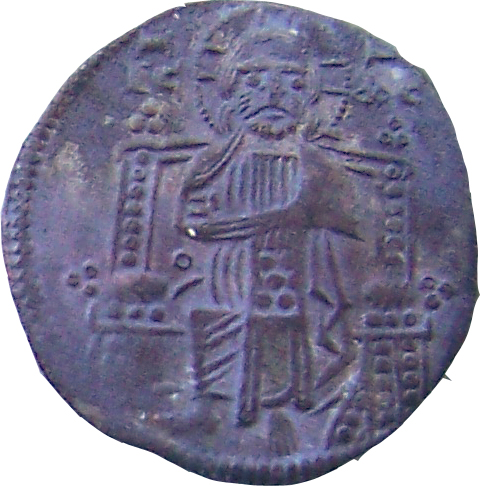
A coin by Ranieri Zena (1253–1268) - reverse

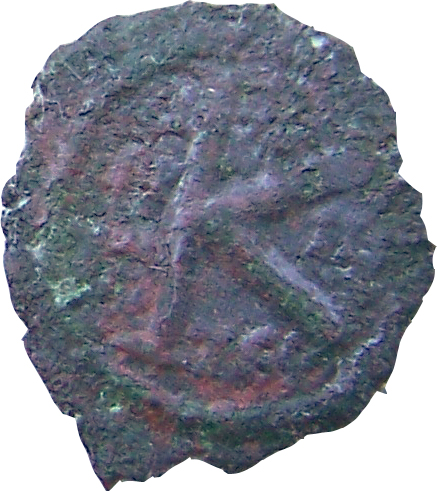
A coin by Justinian I (527–565)
