= Gošo Vikentiev =

Commander Gošo Vikentiev
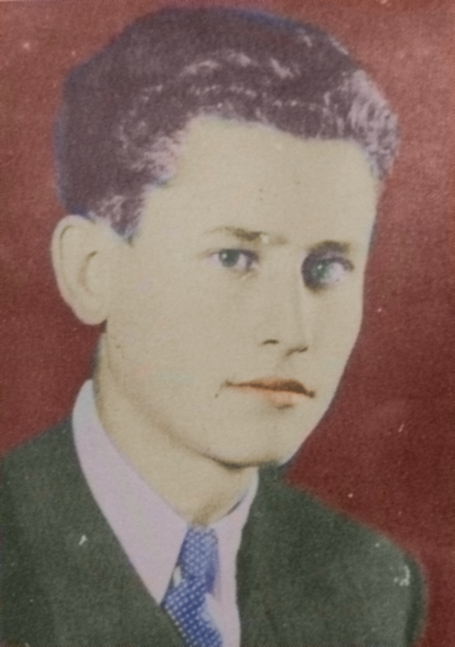
- Born: Ѓорѓи Димитровски Викентиев; 19 April 1920; Kočani, Kingdom of Yugoslavia
- Died: 17 October 1944 (aged 24); Kočani, German occupation zone of Yugoslavia
- Military career
- Units: XIV Brigade, VI Battalion

Gošo Vikentiev, born Gjorgi Dimitrovski Vikentiev (Macedonian: Ѓорѓи Димитровски Викентиев; 19 April 1920 – 17 October 1944) was a Macedonian military activist and freedom fighter in the People's Liberation Army of Macedonia during World War II.

Vikentiev was born into a craftsman family. Having graduated elementary school in his hometown of Kočani, he attended the Military technology high school in Kragujevac between 1934 and 1939. In September 1944, he joined the IV Macedonian Brigade as a fighter, and was later promoted to commander.

Vikentiev was killed in action during the attack for the liberation of Kočani from the Axis Powers on 17 October 1944.

The technical high school СОУ „Ѓошо Викентиев“ in Kočani was named after him on 5 December 1959 in honor of his liberation efforts. A street in Kočani also carries his name.
