= Boško Virjanac =

Serbian Chetnik commander

Vojvoda Boško Virjanac
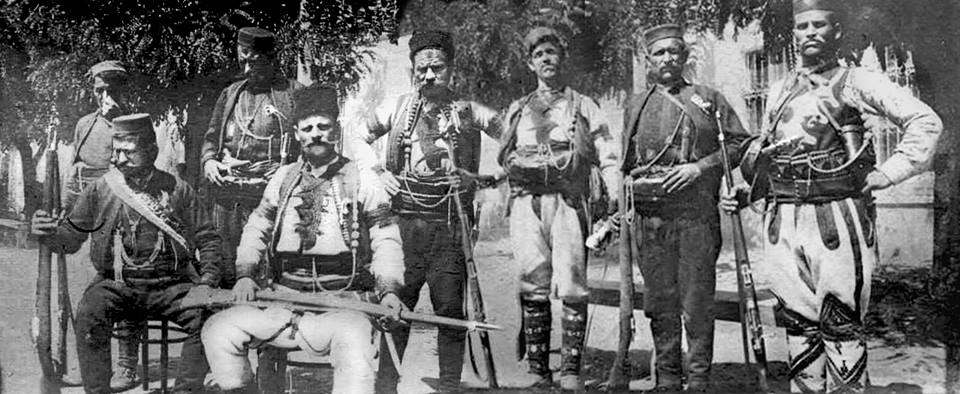
- Boško standing second from the right, 1908.
- Born: Boško Mitrović; Vir, Ottoman Empire (now Makedonski Brod, R. Macedonia)
- Died: Skačinci, Kingdom of Serbia
- Military career
- Allegiance: Serbian Chetnik Organization; (Kingdom of Serbia) Serbian Army
- Service years: 1904–15
- Rank: vojvoda
- Nickname: "Virjanac" or "Virčanac" (demonym)
- Unit: Prilep

Boško Mitrović (Serbian Cyrillic: Бошко Митровић, fl. 1903–15), known by the nom de guerre Virjanac (Вирјанац) or Virčanac (Вирчанац), was a Serbian Chetnik commander.

== Early life ==
He was from Vir, in Poreče, at the time part of the Manastir Vilayet, Ottoman Empire (now Makedonski Brod, R. Macedonia).

== Serbian Chetnik Organization ==
The Prilep group, led by Boško, descended into Prilep crossing Prisat and Pletvar on the Crna Reka.

His monthly pay by the Serbian government in 1909 was 60 dinars. In 1911, it was 3 lira.

== Balkan Wars ==
In 1913 he participated in the suppression of the Ohrid-Debar uprising, a joint Bulgarian-Albanian uprising in Western Macedonia against the new Serbian government.

== First World War ==
During the First World War, he was part of Jovan Babunski's band. The band left Azot and entered the Klepe mountain region, where they were informed of a Bulgarian band that hid in a mill in Skačinci. Boško died during the attack.

== Annotations ==
- According to state documents his full name was Boško Mitrović. Vasilije Trbić, his fellow fighter, wrote his name in his memoirs as Boško Virjanac (Бошко Вирјанац), while contemporary Ivan Ivanić spelled it Virčanac (Бошко Вирчанац). His name is also spelled as Macedonian: Бошко Виријанец/Boško Virijanec, Bulgarian: Бошко Вирянец/Boshko Viryanets

== See also ==
- List of Chetnik voivodes

== Sources ==
- Trbić, Vasilije; Drašković, Aleksandar; Ristevski, Stojanče; Janković, Stojan (1996). Memoari: 1912-1918, 1941-1946. Kultura. pp. 36–43. ISBN 9788678010132.
- Dedijer, Vladimir; Anić, Života; Samardžić, Radovan (1980). Dokumenti o spoljnoj politici Kraljevine Srbije. Srpska akademija nauka i umetnosti. Odeljenje istorijskih nauka. Srpska akademija nauka i umetnosti, Odeljenje istorijskih nauka. "„Београдске новинс" нпр. недавно су донеле како је „славни" војвода Бошко напустио Скопску Црну Гору и отишао да тражи дружину; данас пак сиромах Бошко седи овде у Скопљу и кука да га испратим у Србију јер се боји о себи ..."
- Delo. Vol. 49. A.M. Stanojević. 1908. p. 63. "Поздравља тебе и све остале војвода Бошко. „Шта је ово, господин Долгач?" питаше Глигор. Па онда читајући на поцепаној коверти своју адресу, он се још више разјари. Долгач се бранио, завијајући како је ретко ко могао, те се ..."
- Abadžiev, Ǵorǵi (1958). Balkanskite vojni i Makedonija. Institut za nat͡sionalna istorija. p. 146. "Во тој состав бил и војводата Јован Бабунски. Трбиќ минал со велешката група преку Владиловци, Попадија, Подлес и Ораовец. Прилепската група, под војводството на Бошко Виријанец, се спуштила преку Прилеп (преку Присат и Плетвар) на Црна Река. Групите се собрале при мостот над Црна Река кај селото Возарци, ..."
- Bojić, Radivoje; Knežević, Radoje L. (1968). Milutin Bojić pesnik Srbije. Avala. p. 84. "С наше стране је дат јак отпор и после три-четири дана чета је уништена у крвавој борби у селу Скачивцу. И с наше стране било је жртава; ту је погинуо наш четнички војвода Бошко Вирчанац, родом из једног села у близини ..."
- "Вино-Вод", Свезнање, 1937, "ВИРЧАНАЦ Бошко († 1915.), један од најзаслужнијих и најскромнијих четничких војвода; погинуо у борби са Бугарима у Скачинцу код Велеса."
