= Cene Marković =

19th-20th century Serbian Chetnik commander

Vojvoda Cene Marković
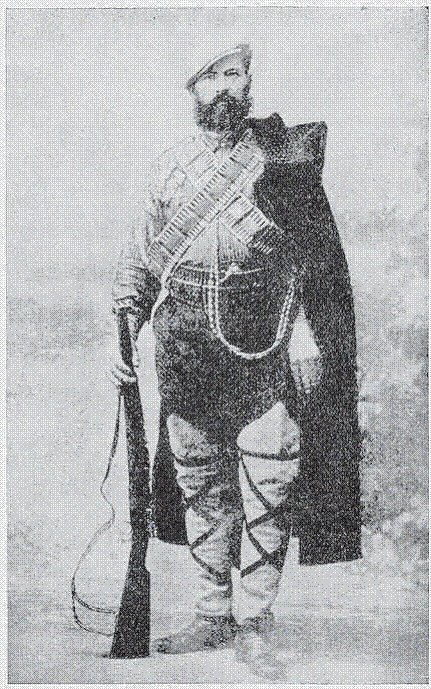
- Cene Marković in Chetnik gear.
- Born: Aleksandar Marković; 1864; Jelošnik, Ottoman Empire (now North Macedonia)
- Died: Unknown
- Military career
- Allegiance: Kingdom of Serbia (1912–18); Serbian Chetnik Organization (1905–12); IMRO (?–1905)
- Service years: 1905–18
- Rank: vojvoda
- Nickname: Cene

Aleksandar Marković (Serbian Cyrillic: Александар Марковић, 1864–1918+), known by his nickname Cene (Цене Марковић), was a Serbian Chetnik commander (voivoda) in Macedonia, in the Balkan Wars and World War I.

== Life ==
Marković was born in the village of Jelošnik near Tetovo (now in North Macedonia). He lived in his village for his first 15 years, then sought work in the Principality of Bulgaria, then a vassal state of the Ottoman Empire. He finished training at the NCO school and served as a soldier, then returned to Bulgaria, as a cavalry officer of the Bulgarian Army.

He joined the Internal Macedonian Revolutionary Organization (IMRO) and quickly became a voivoda (commander). After the massacre of Serbs in Kokošinje and Rudar by IMRO in 1905 he left the organization and joined the Serbian Chetnik Organization. Identifying as a Serb, he could not forgive the cruelty of the massacres, and fled at once at night and joined the Serbian bands, operating on the left side of the Vardar, with his band in Upper Poreč and in the Gostivar region. He mainly fought against Albanian kachaks.

With the outbreak of the First Balkan War in 1912, he joined the Chetnik detachment of Vojislav Tankosić and participated in fighting in Merdare, destroying the Ottoman border stations. In World War I he fought against the Austro-Hungarians in Belgrade, then was sent to his home region to monitor the IMRO. In 1915, with the fall of Serbia, the Bulgarians attacked Tetovo, killing Marković's horse, but he survived and escaped into Albania. He fought on the Macedonian front. During this time he married in Bitola, then returned to fighting in the north. When the war ended, he returned to his village, which was devastated, the houses having been burnt down by the Bulgarians.

== See also ==
- List of Chetnik voivodes

== Sources ==
- Jovanović, Aleksa (1937). Spomenica dvadesetogodišnjice oslobodjenja Južne Srbije, 1912-1937 (in Serbian). Južna Srbija.
- Đurić, Veljko Đ.; Mijović, Miličko (1993). Ilustrovana istorija četničkog pokreta (in Serbian).
- Trbić, Vasilije (1996). Memoari: 1898-1912 (in Serbian). Kultura. ISBN 9788678010132.
