= Kočani =

Kočani Кочани (Macedonian)
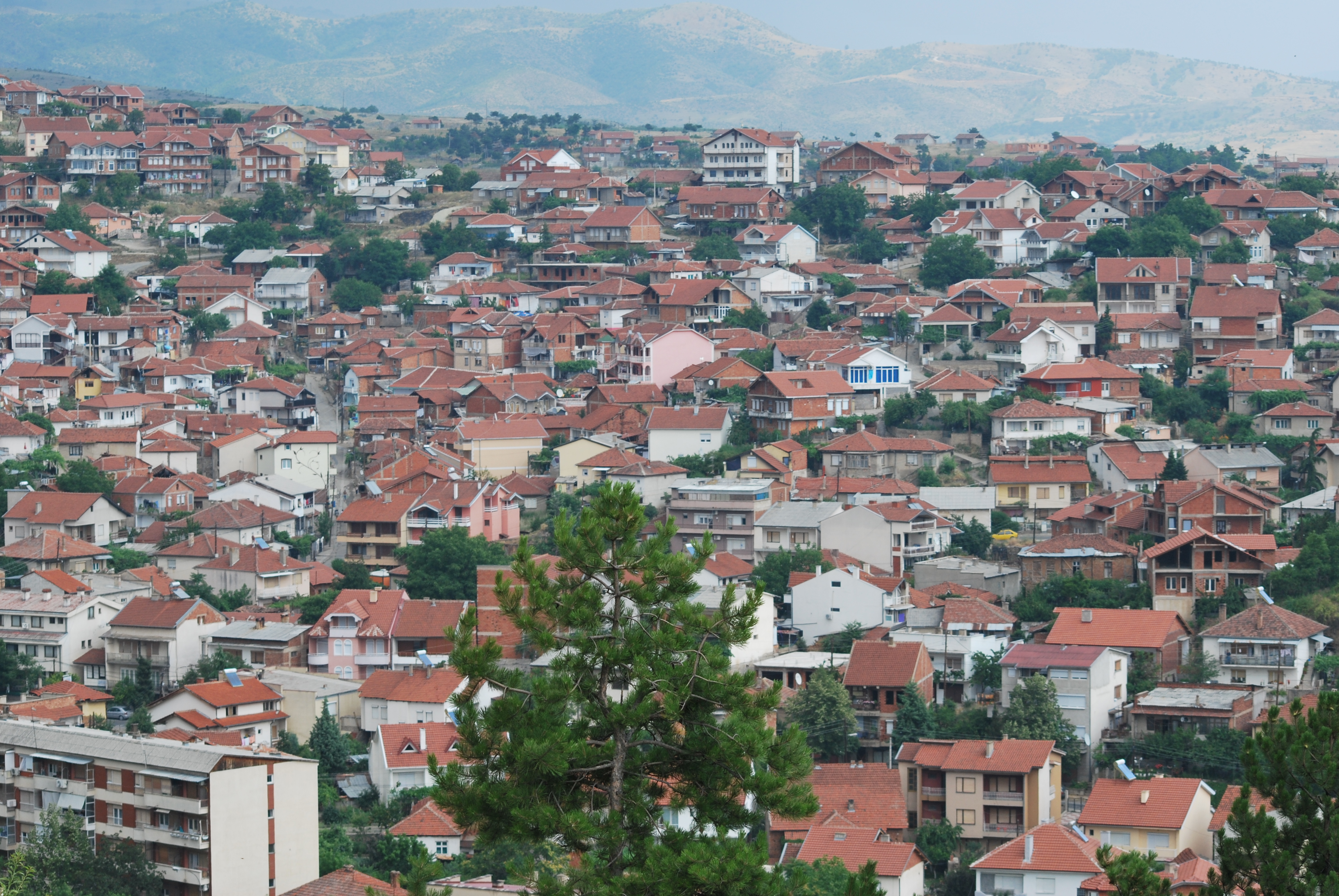
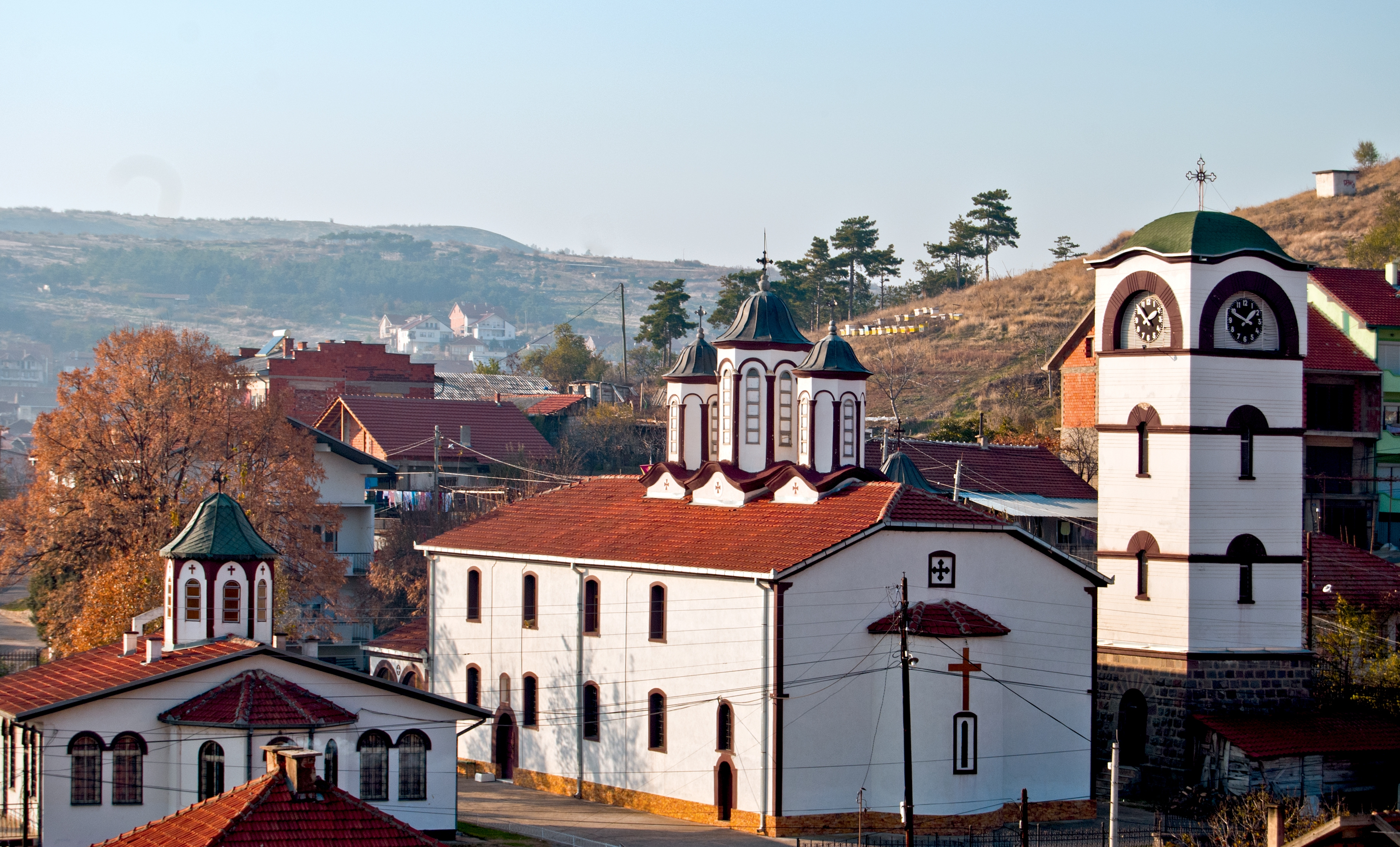
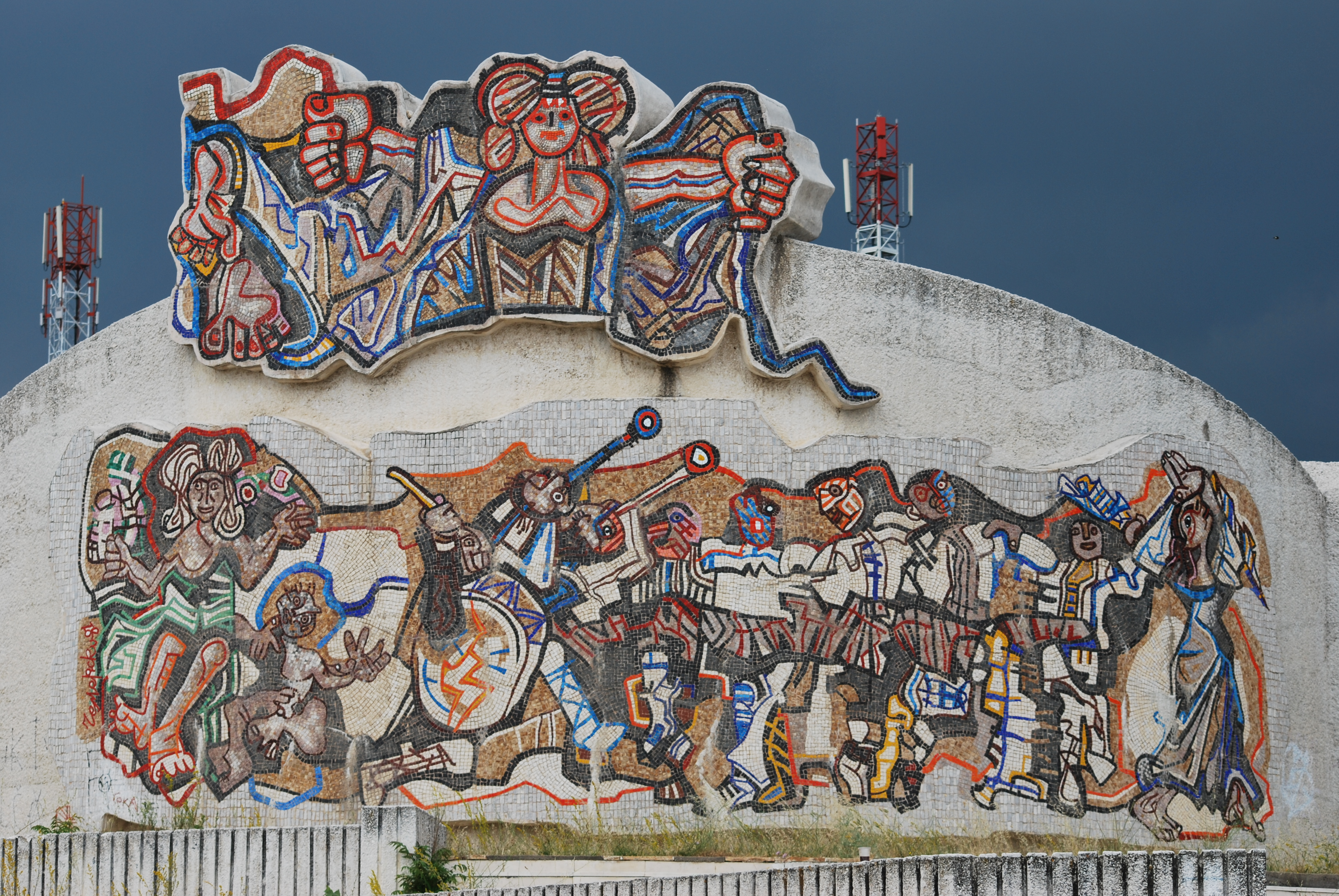
- From the top, view of Kočani, St. George's Church, Freedom Monument

- Flag Seal
- Motto(s): City of rice and geothermal water
- Location within North Macedonia
- Coordinates: 41°55′16″N 22°24′41″E
- Country: North Macedonia
- Region: Eastern
- Municipality: Kočani
- Geoname: 789403
- Founded: 1337
- Council: SDSM - 8, VMRO-DPMNE - 8, Levica - 1, LDP/DOM - 1, Independent - 1

Government
  - Mayor: Venko Krstevski

Area
  - Total: 18.6 km^{2} (7.2 sq mi)
- Highest elevation: 420 m (1,380 ft)
- Lowest elevation: 350 m (1,150 ft)

Population (2021)
  - Total: 24,632
  - Density: 1,320/km^{2} (3,430/sq mi)
- Time zone: UTC+1 (CET)
  - Summer (DST): UTC+2 (CEST)
- Postal code: 2300
- Area code: (++389) 33
- Vehicle registration: KO
- Official language: Macedonian
- Geothermal water temperature: 78°C
- Settlements: 28
- Climate: Cfa
- Website: www.kocani.gov.mk

Kočani (Macedonian: Кочани [ˈkɔtʃani]) is a town in the eastern part of North Macedonia, situated around 100 kilometres (62 mi) east from Skopje. It has a population of 24,632 as of 2021 and is the seat of the Kočani Municipality.

== Geography ==
The town spreads across the northern side of the Kočani valley, along the banks of the Kočani river, where it leaves the mountain slopes and flows through the valley. North of the town is the Osogovo mountain (2,252 m or 7,388 ft), and 8 kilometres (5.0 mi) to the south, the valley is closed by the mountain Plačkovica (1,754 m or 5,755 ft). The town is 350–450 m (1,150–1,480 ft) above sea level.

Kočani covers 18.6 square kilometres (7.2 sq mi).

=== Climate ===
The climate is humid subtropical (Köppen: Cfa), influenced by altered Mediterranean climate which penetrates along the river Bregalnica. The average temperature is 12.9 °C (55.2 °F) with 538 mm (21.2 in) rainfall.

== History ==
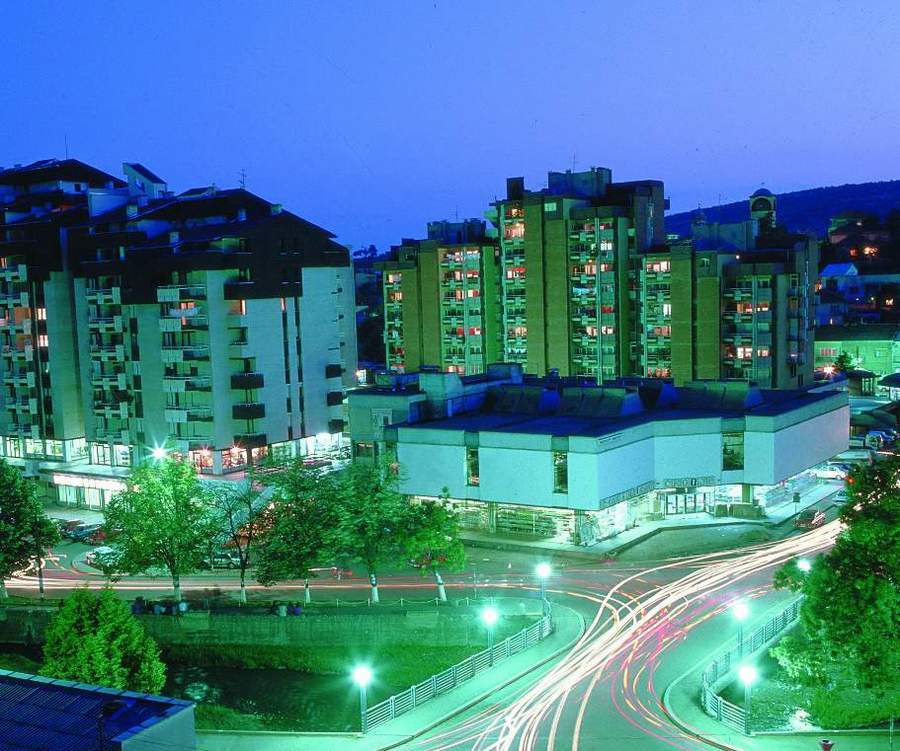
Kočani at night

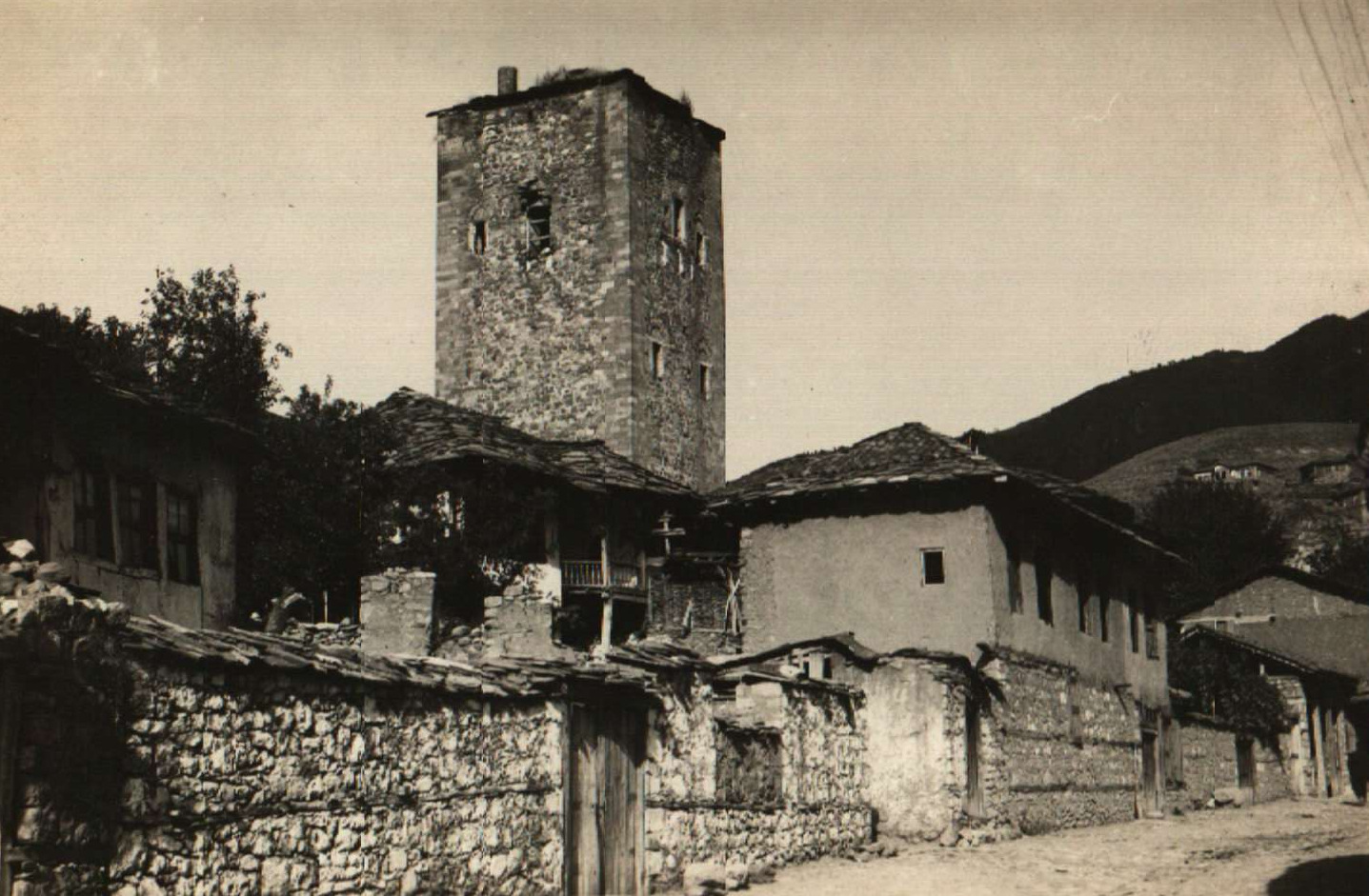
Kočani in 1942

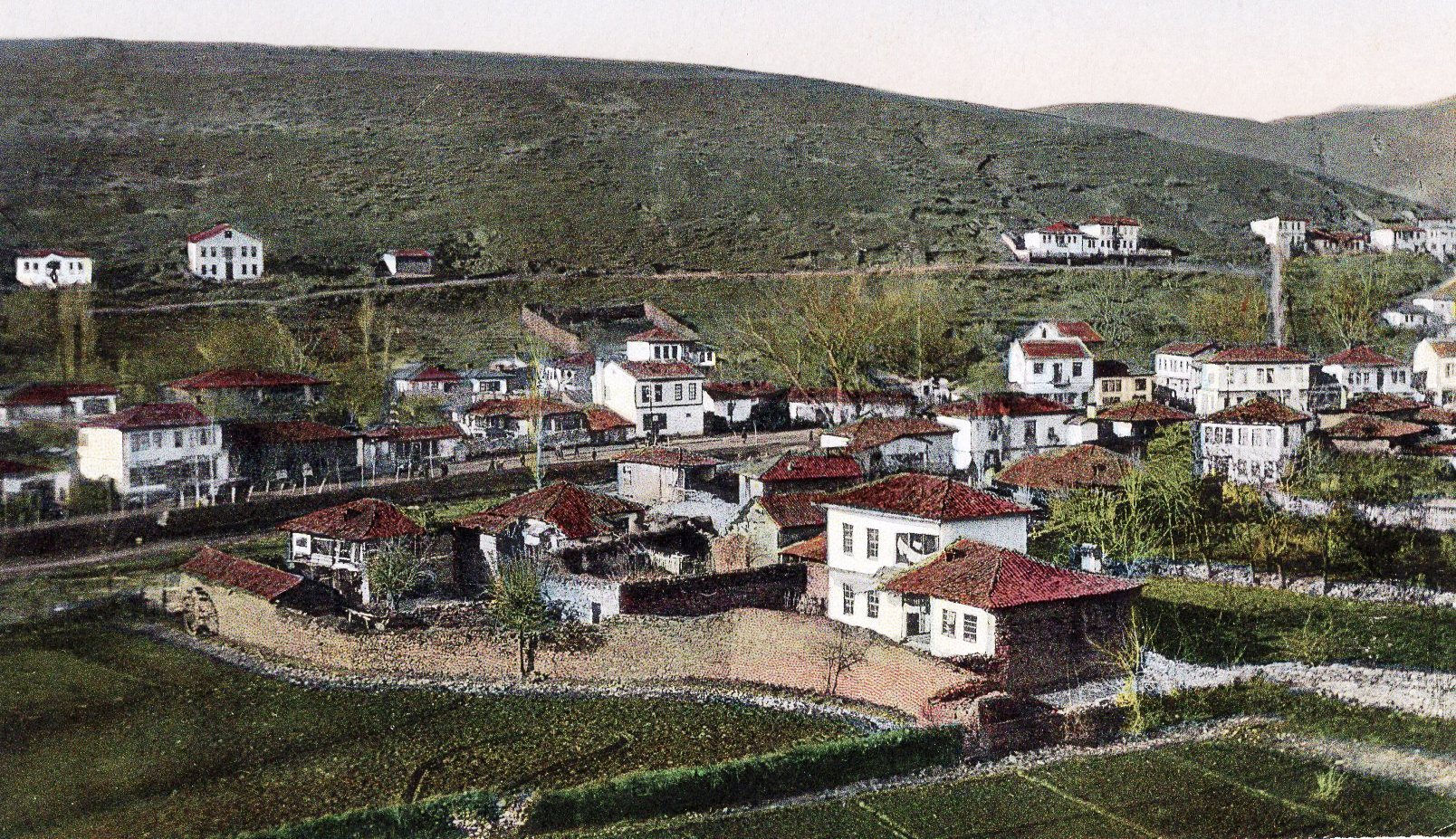
Postcard of Kočani, from 1930s

Due to its favourable geographic location, together with excellent natural climate characteristics, Kočani was inhabited as early as the ancient times first by the Paionians, Meds and Thracians. Later on, in the 6th century the Slavs inhabited parts of the region. More precisely, in the 7th century members of the Slavic tribe Smolyani colonized the Kočani valley and built a fortification. The founders of the Slavic education, brothers Kiril and Metodij (Cyril and Methodius), stayed in the valley from the year 845 to 855 and in the Bregalnica area (Morodvis) started to preach Christianity in Slavic language.

Although the settlement existed long before that, Kočani was first mentioned in a charter from 1337 in which Despot Jovan Oliver donated the church of St. Dimitrija to Kočani.

Archaeological finds in the town itself have revealed remains of a settlement here in the Roman and Byzantine periods. Early in the 15th century it fell under Ottoman rule. The travel chronicler Evliya Çelebi, who visited it in 1662, recorded that it had 600 households, a mosque, a mezjid, an inn and 15 handicraft stores. During the 18th and in the early 19th century, the town growth rate stagnated. It was only around 1878 that the population began to rise, at which time it had about 450–500 households. The town has two feudal residences in the shape of towers believed to date from the 16th–17th century.

At least 63 people were killed and 152 were injured after a fire broke out in the Pulse nightclub during a concert on 16 March 2025.

== Demographics ==
=== Population ===
Kočani has a population of 24,632 inhabitants, which makes it the third regional center in the Eastern part of the country:

- 1948 – 6,657 inhabitants
- 1994 – 26,364 inhabitants
- 2002 – 28,330 inhabitants
- 2021 – 24,632 inhabitants

=== Ethnic structure ===
According to the 1903 Austrian consular reports on ethnic composition of the kazas of the Sanjak of Skopje in 1903, the kaza of Kočani was populated by a total of 39,406 inhabitants, of whom 16,524 (41.93%) were Bulgarian Exarchists, 11,600 (29.44%) Ottoman Muslim, 7,800 (19.79%) Albanians, 1,680 (4.26%) Aromanians, 1,090 (2.77%) Patriarchists and 712 (1.8%) Romanis.

According to the 2002 census, the ethnic composition of the city was as follows:

- Macedonian: 90.3%
- Roma: 5.0%
- Turks: 3.0%
- Vlachs: 0.5%
- Serbs: 0.2%
- Other: 1.0%

As of 2021, the city of Kočani had 24,632 inhabitants, and the ethnic composition was the following:

- Macedonians: 20,229 (82.1%)
- Romani: 1,892 (7.7%)
- Aromanians: 169 (<1%)
- Turks: 138 (<1%)
- Serbs: 36 (<1%)
- Albanians: 12 (<1%)
- Bosniaks: 11 (<1%)
- Others: 118 (<1%)
- Unknown: 2,027 (8.2%)

=== Religious denominations ===
- Orthodox: 96%
- Muslims: 3%
- Catholic: 0.3%
- Other: 0.7%

== City council ==
Following the 2021 local elections, the city council is constituted as follows:

Party / list	Seats	My Parliament
SDSM	8	My Parliament
VMRO-DPMNE	8	My Parliament
The Left	1	My Parliament
LDP-DOM	1	My Parliament
Independent politicians	1	My Parliament
Total	19	My Parliament

== Monuments ==
Numerous cultural and historical monuments, from ancient times to the Middle Ages, can be found in the vicinity of Kočani. One of them is an archeological site of Dolno Gradishte from the late antic period, and two medieval towers at the city center.

Monastery complexes in the nearby villages Morodvis and Panteley are world-famous both for their architecture and unique frescoes.

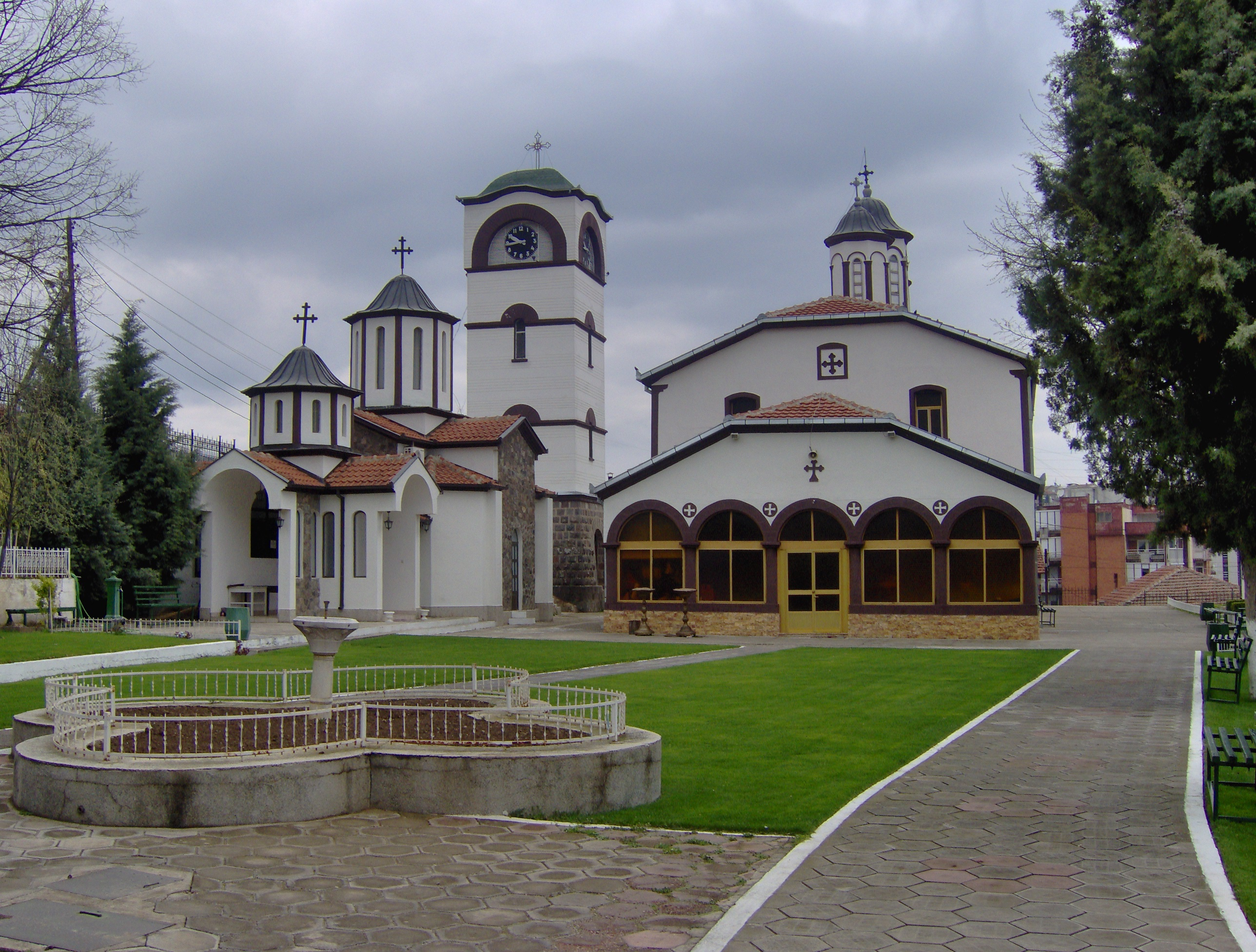
St. George Orthodox Church in Kočani

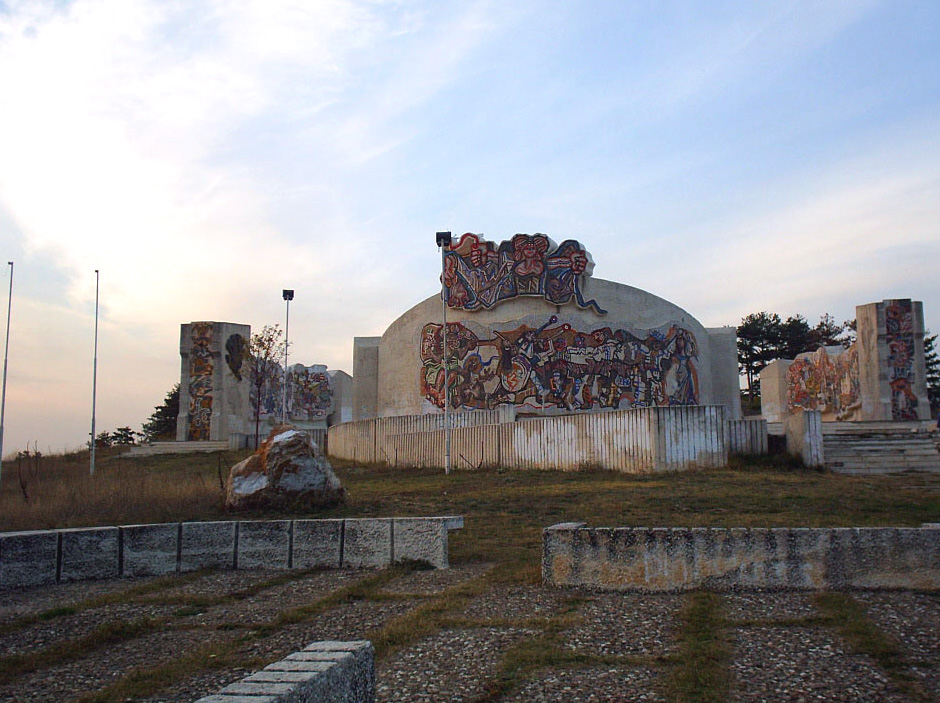
Freedom Monument in Kočani

== Education ==
The City of Kočani is served by four primary schools:

- Nikola Karev Primary School
- Saints Cyril and Methodius Primary School
- Rade Kratovče Primary School
- Malina Popivanova Primary School

There are also two secondary schools:

- Ljupčo Santov Gymnasium (specializing in economics)
- Gjošo Vikentev (specializing in electronics and machinery)

There is also a primary school specializing in music:

- Risto Jurukov Primary School for Music

The city also maintains a municipal library, "Iskra" ("spark").

== Sports ==
Local football club FK Osogovo has played several seasons in the Macedonian First Football League.

== Town partnerships ==
Kočani maintains partnership links with the following places:

- Kazanlak, Bulgaria
- Szigetszentmiklós, Hungary
- Yenifoça, Turkey
- Križevci, Croatia
- Pereyaslav, Ukraine
- Kranj, Slovenia
- Novi Kneževac, Serbia
- Gosport, England

== Notable people ==
- Kočani Orkestar, musicians
- Malina Popivanova, revolutionary
- Stevo Teodosievski, musician
- Gošo Vikentiev, commander in the XIV Macedonian Youth National Liberation Brigade in the attack to liberate Kočani from the Axis powers during World War II

== See also ==
- Coat of arms of Kočani Municipality
