= Gradošorci =

Gradošorci Грaдошорци
- Location within North Macedonia
- Coordinates: 41.481588°N 22.624153°E
- Country: North Macedonia
- Region: Southeastern
- Municipality: Vasilevo

Population
  - Total: 1,484
- Time zone: UTC+1 (CET)
  - Summer (DST): UTC+2 (CEST)

Gradošorci (Macedonian: Грaдошорци) is a village in the municipality of Vasilevo, North Macedonia.

== Demographics ==
According to the 2002 census, the village had a total of 1,744 inhabitants. Ethnic groups in the village include:

- Macedonians 1,041
- Turks 683
- Romani 5
- Others 15

As of 2021, the village of Gradoshorci has 1.484 inhabitants and the ethnic composition was the following:

- Macedonians – 687
- Turks – 648
- Person without Data - 149
