= Golozinci =

Golozinci Golozinci
- Village
- Location within North Macedonia
- Coordinates: 41°37′N 21°42′E
- Country: North Macedonia
- Region: Vardar
- Municipality: Čaška

Population (2021)
  - Total: 30
- Time zone: UTC+1 (CET)
  - Summer (DST): UTC+2 (CEST)
- Car plates: VE
- Website: .

Golozinci (Macedonian: Golozinci) is a village in the municipality of Čaška, North Macedonia.

== Name ==
The village is known in Albanian as Golozinca.

== Demographics ==
According to the 2021 census, the village had a total of 30 inhabitants. Ethnic groups in the village include:

- Macedonians 28
- Albanians 2

Year	Macedonian	Albanian	Turks	Romani	Aromanians	Serbs	Bosniaks	Others	Total
2002	43	...	...	...	...	...	...	...	43
2021	28	2	...	...	...	...	...	...	30
