= Vladilovci =

Vladilovci Vladilovci
- Village
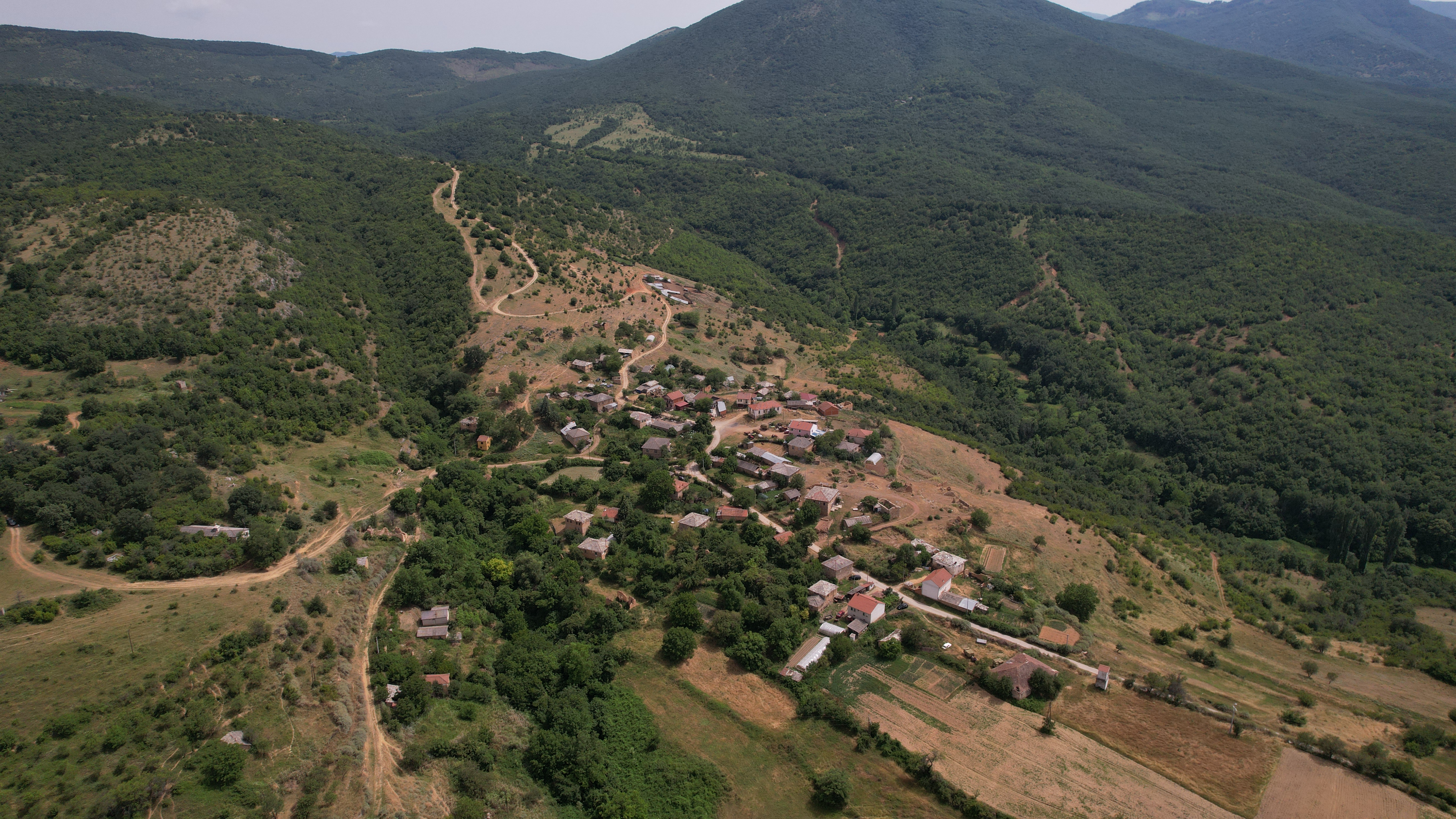
- Air view of the village

- Location within North Macedonia
- Coordinates: 41°37′N 21°42′E
- Country: North Macedonia
- Region: Vardar
- Municipality: Čaška

Population (2021)
  - Total: 47
- Time zone: UTC+1 (CET)
  - Summer (DST): UTC+2 (CEST)
- Car plates: VE
- Website: .

Vladilovci (Macedonian: Vladilovci) is a village in the municipality of Čaška, North Macedonia.

== Demographics ==
According to the 2021 census, the village had a total of 47 inhabitants. Ethnic groups in the village include:

- Macedonians 47

Year	Macedonian	Albanian	Turks	Romani	Aromanians	Serbs	Bosniaks	Others	Total
2002	77	...	...	...	...	...	...	...	77
2021	47	...	...	...	...	...	...	...	47
