= Vasily Vereshchagin =

19th-century Russian war artist

- Василий Верещагин
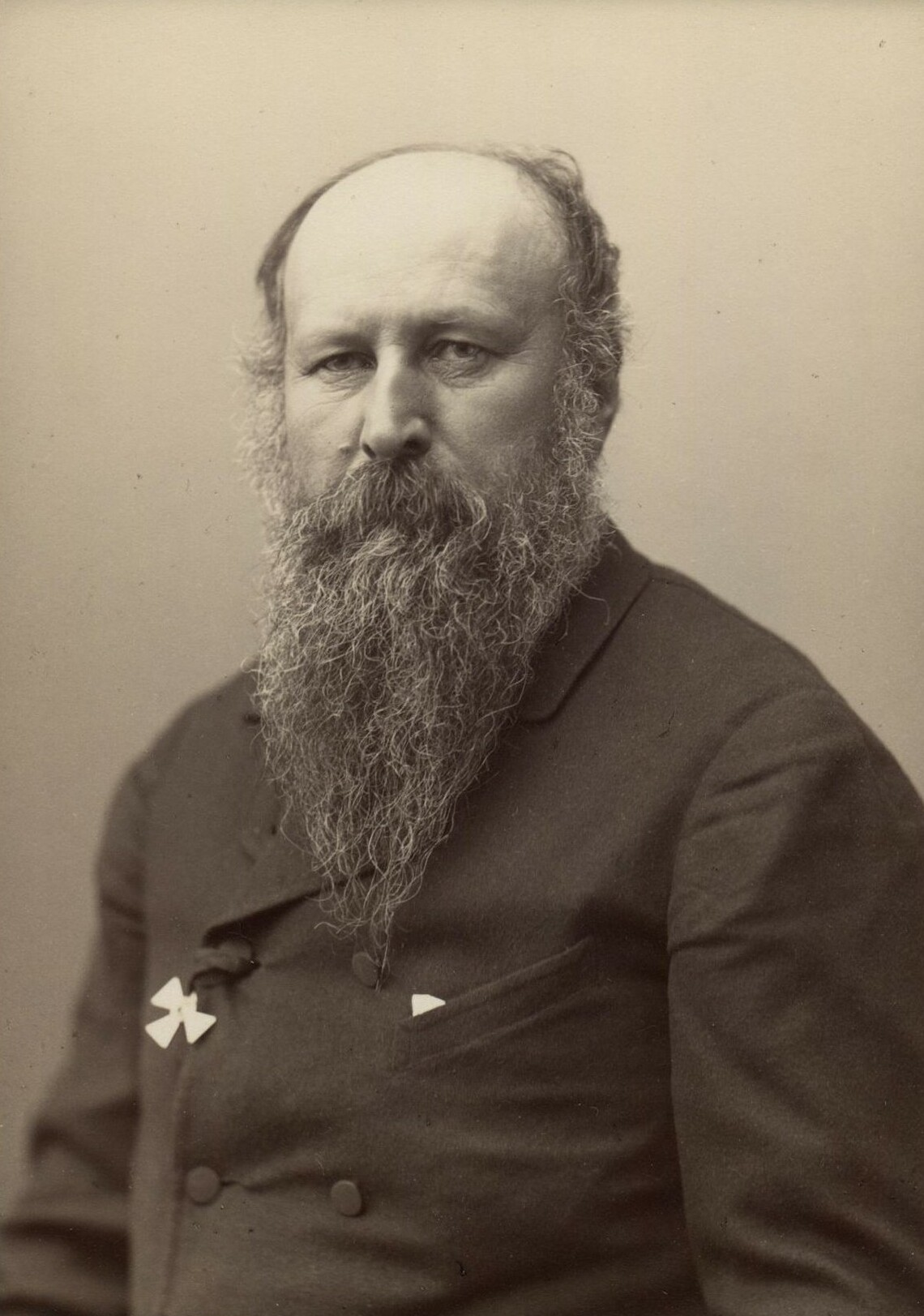
- Born: 26 October 1842; Cherepovets, Novgorod Governorate, Russian Empire
- Died: 13 April 1904 (aged 61); Port Arthur, Russian Empire (now Lüshunkou, China)
- Alma mater: St. Petersburg Academy of Arts
- Occupations: Painter; Writer; Military; Traveller
- Notable work: The Apotheosis of War (1871); Blowing from Guns in British India (1884)
- Style: Realism
- Awards: Order of St. George (4th Class)

Vasily Vasilyevich Vereshchagin (Russian: Василий Васильевич Верещагин; 26 October 1842 – 13 April 1904) was a Russian painter, war artist, and traveller. The graphic nature of his realist scenes led to many of them never being printed or exhibited to the public.

== Years of apprenticeship ==
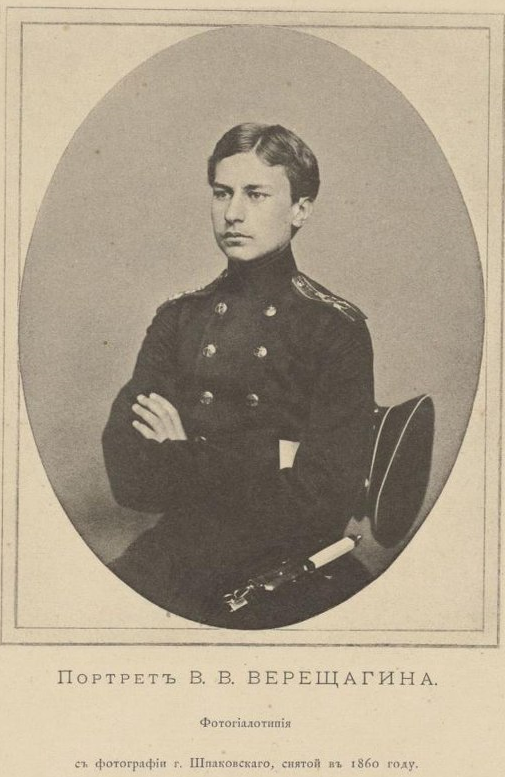
Vereshchagin during the period of graduation from the Naval Cadet Corps (1860s)

Vereshchagin was born at Cherepovets, Novgorod Governorate, Russia, in 1842 as the middle of three brothers. His father was a landowner of noble birth, while his mother was of common origin and had Tatar roots. When he was eight years old, he was sent to Tsarskoe Selo to enter the Alexander Cadet Corps. Three years later, he entered the Naval Cadet Corps at St. Petersburg, making his first voyage in 1858. He served on the frigate Kamchatka, which sailed to Denmark, France, and Egypt.

Vereshchagin graduated first in his list at the naval school, but left the service immediately to begin the study of drawing in earnest. Two years later, in 1863, he won a medal from the Imperial Academy of Arts for his Ulysses Slaying the Suitors. In 1864, he proceeded to Paris, where he studied under Jean-Léon Gérôme, though he dissented widely from his master's methods.

== Travels in Central Asia and related works ==
In the Paris Salon of 1866, Vereshchagin exhibited a drawing of Dukhobors chanting their Psalms. In the next year, he was invited to accompany General Konstantin Petrovich Kaufman's expedition in Central Asia and Turkestan. He was granted the rank of ensign. His heroism at the siege of Samarkand from 2–8 June 1868 resulted an award of the Cross of St. George (4th Class). He was an indefatigable traveller, returning to St. Petersburg in late 1868, to Paris in 1869, back to St. Petersburg later in the year, and then back to Turkestan via Siberia at the end of 1869.

In 1871, Vereshchagin established an atelier in Munich, German Empire. He gave a solo exhibition of his works (later referred to as his "Turkestan Series") at the Crystal Palace in London, United Kingdom in 1873. He gave another exhibition of his works in St. Petersburg in 1874, where two of his paintings, namely, The Apotheosis of War, dedicated "to all conquerors, past, present and to come," and Left Behind, the picture of a dying soldier deserted by his fellows, were denied a showing on the grounds that they portrayed the Russian military in a poor light. In late 1874, Vereshchagin departed in Northern and Eastern Asia for an extensive tour of the Himalayas, British India, Mongolia, and Tibet, spending over two years in travel. He returned to Paris in late 1876.

Early works

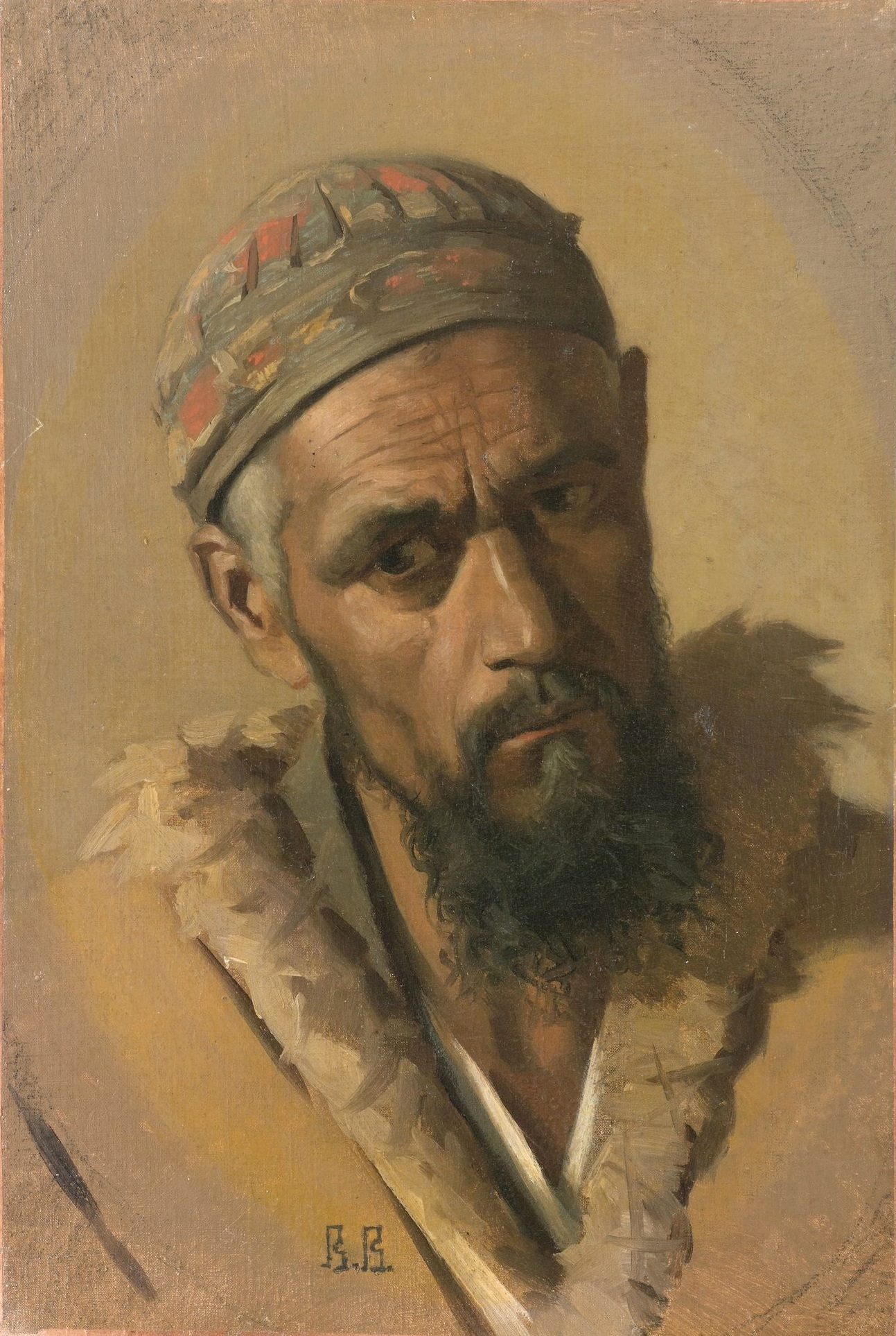
Lyully (Gypsy) (1867–1868)

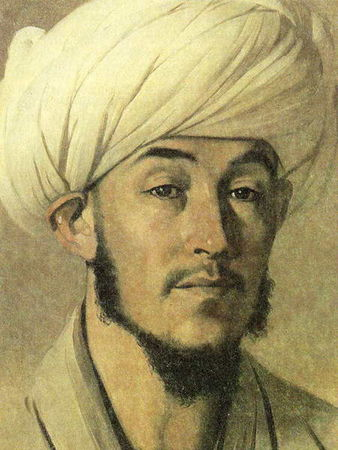
Portrait of a man in a white turban (1867)

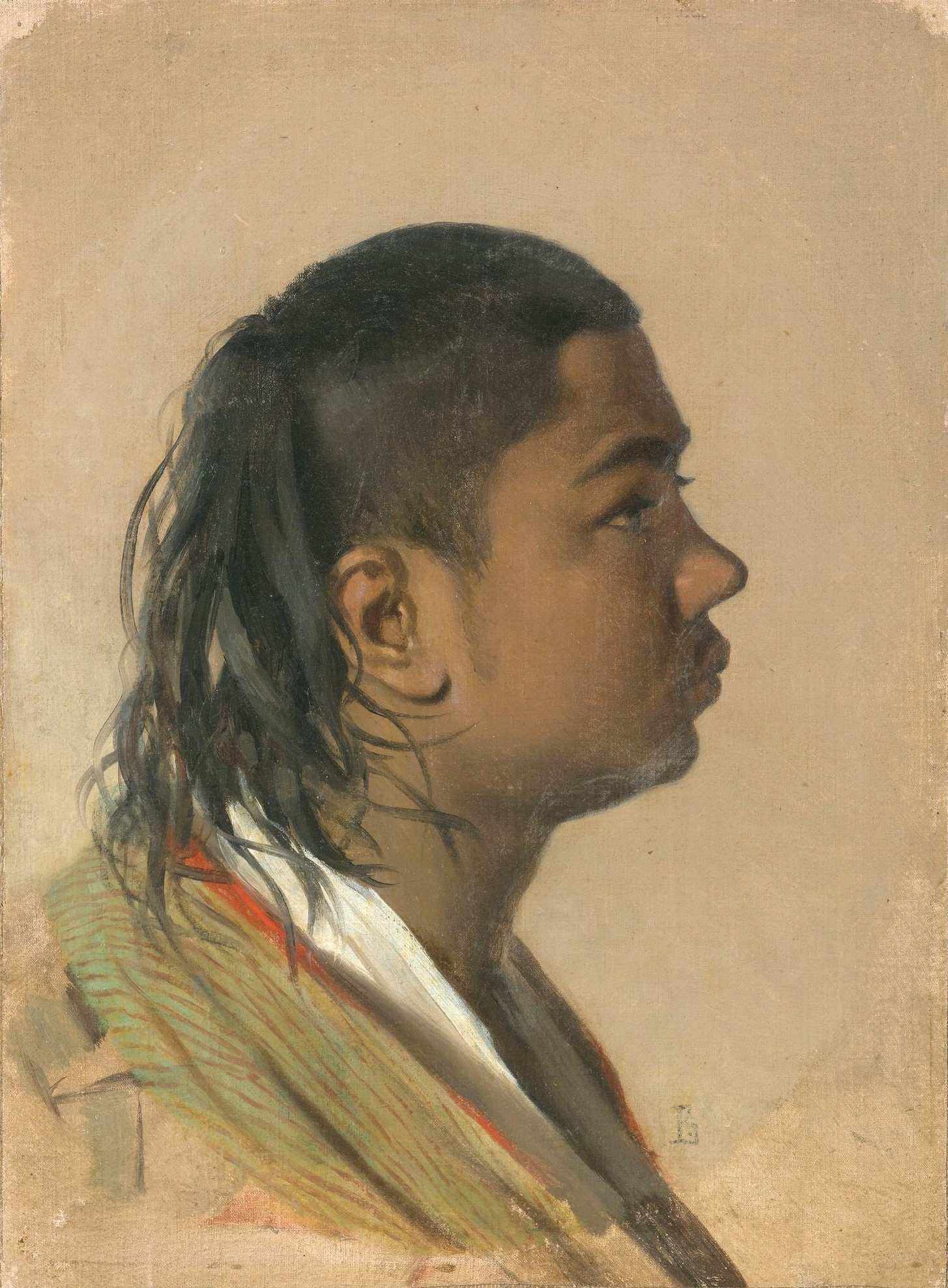
Uzbek boy (1867–1868)

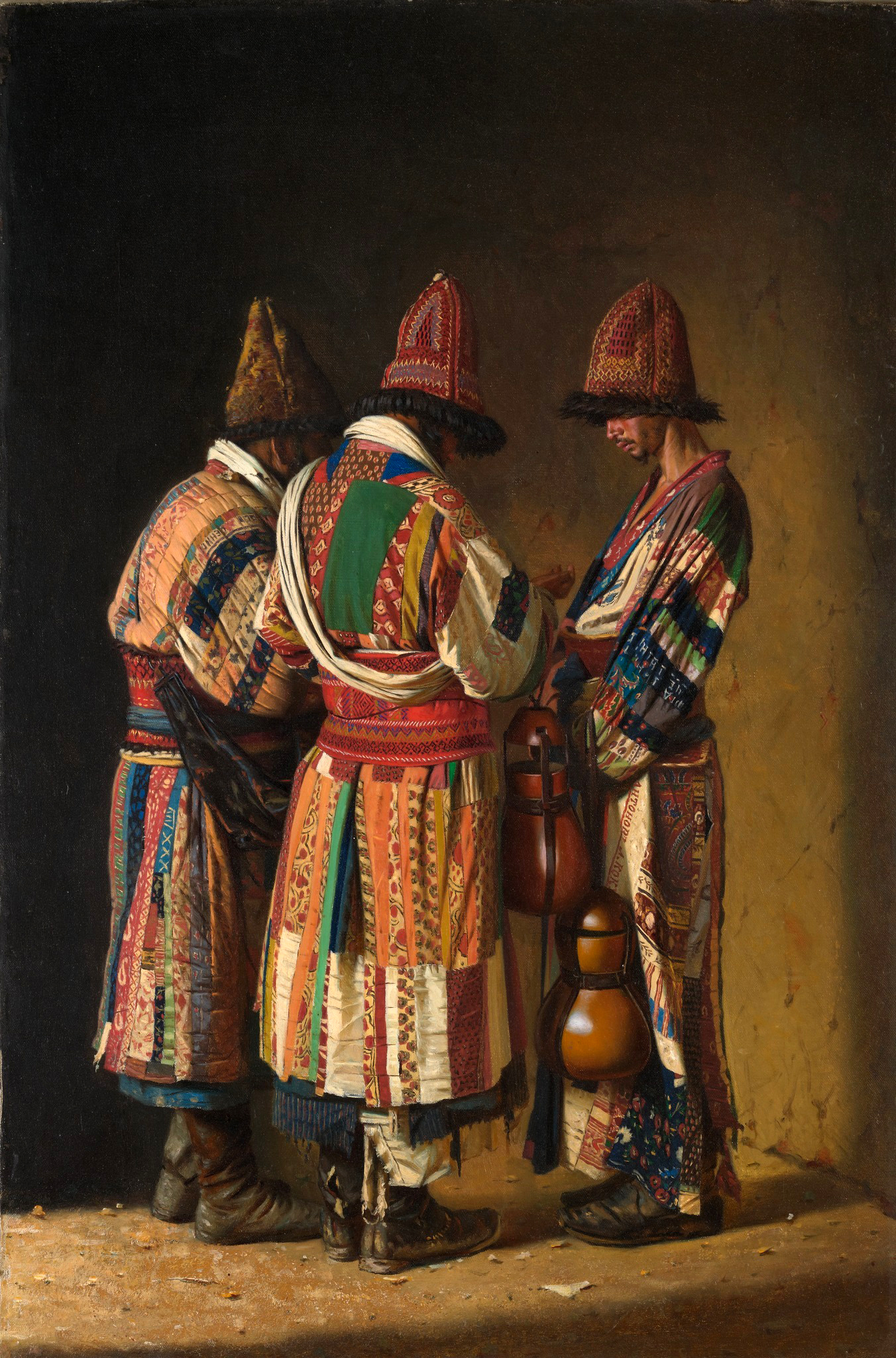
Dervishes in festive outfits (1869–1870)

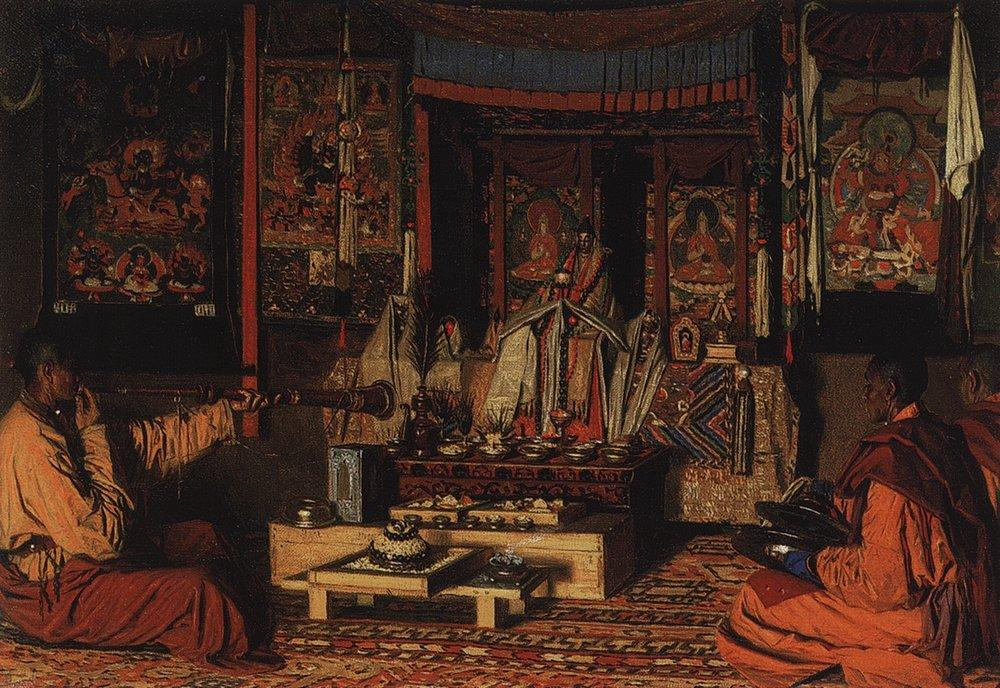
Kalmyk chapel (1869–1870)

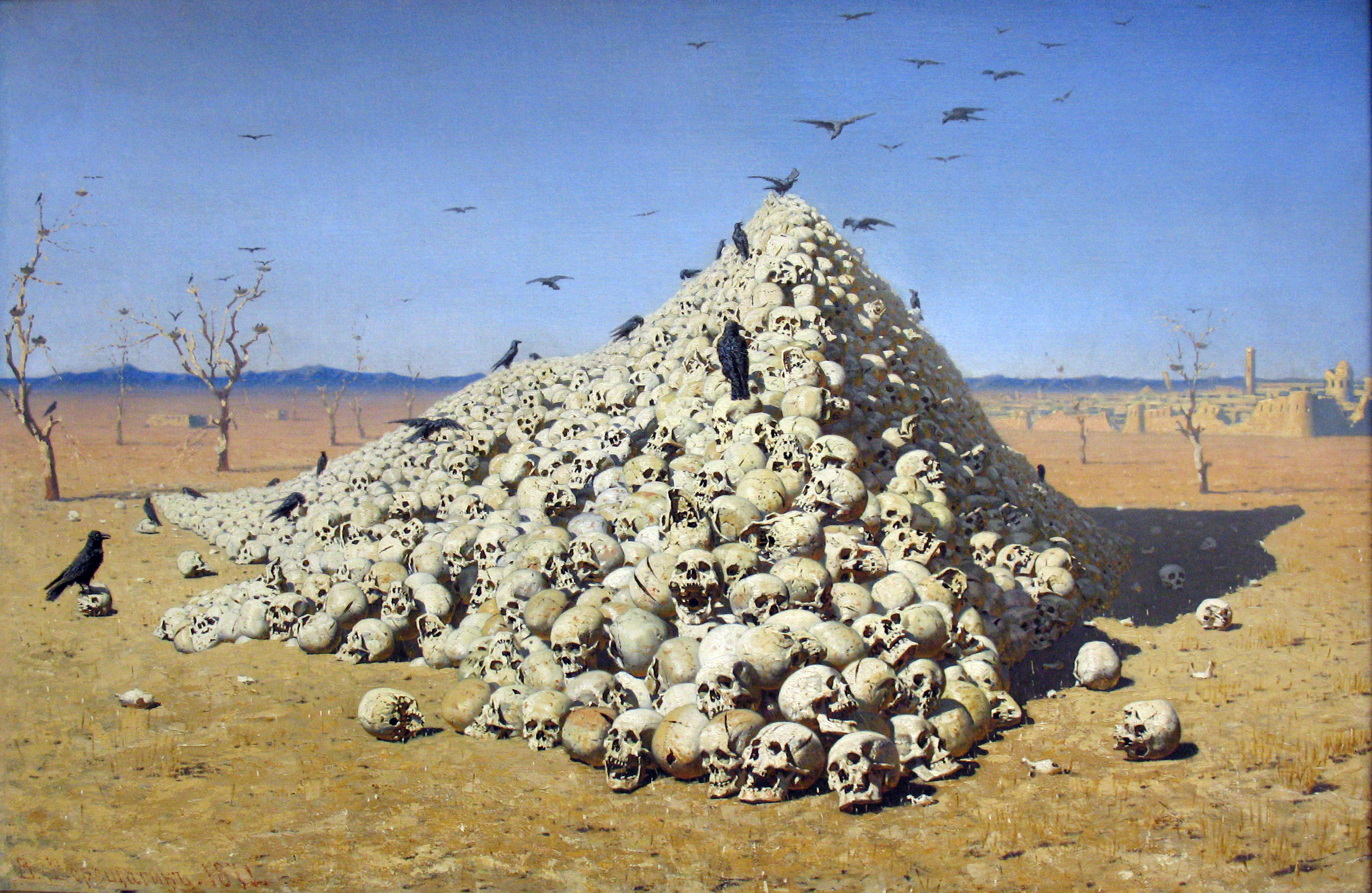
The Apotheosis of War (1871)

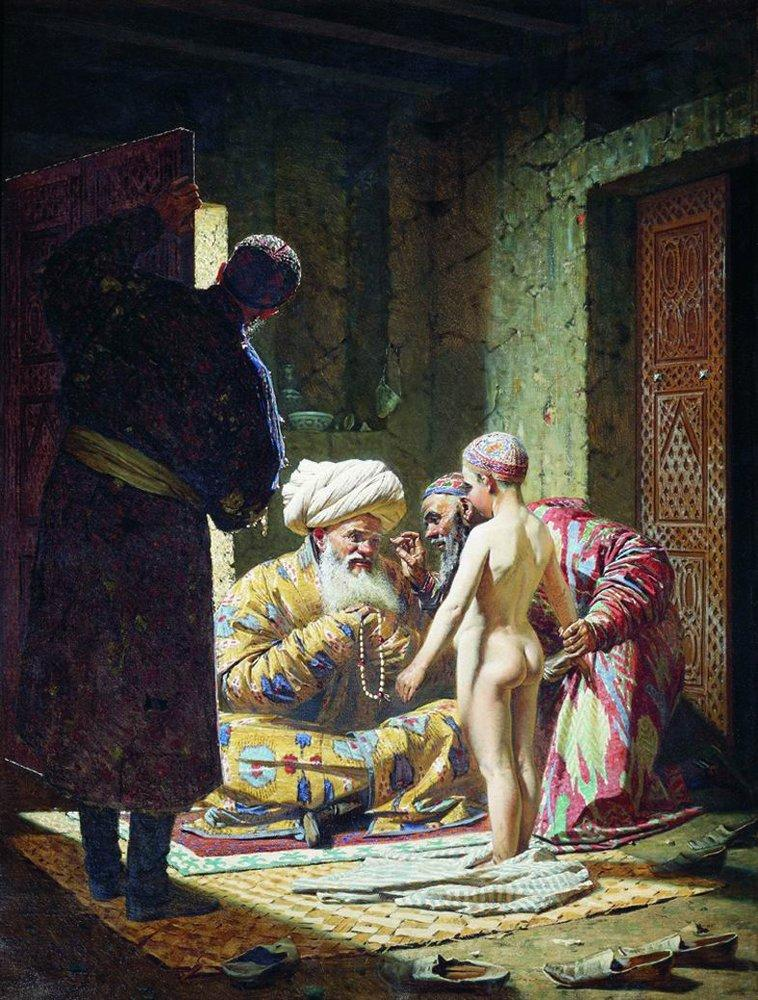
Sale of a child-slave (1872). A rich Turkish man examines a naked boy, before buying him.

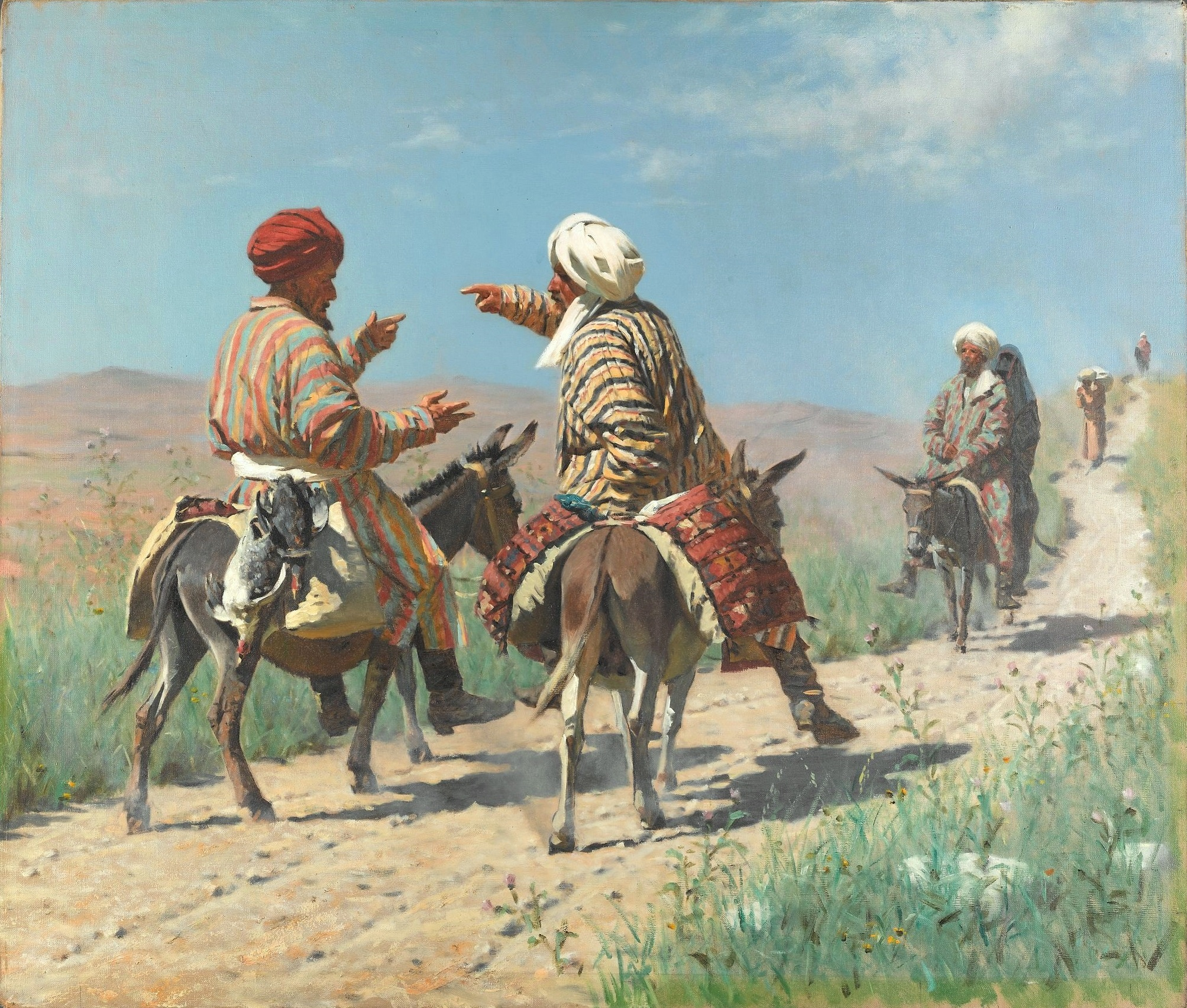
Mullah Rahim and Mullah Kerim on his way to the bazaar are quarreling (1873)

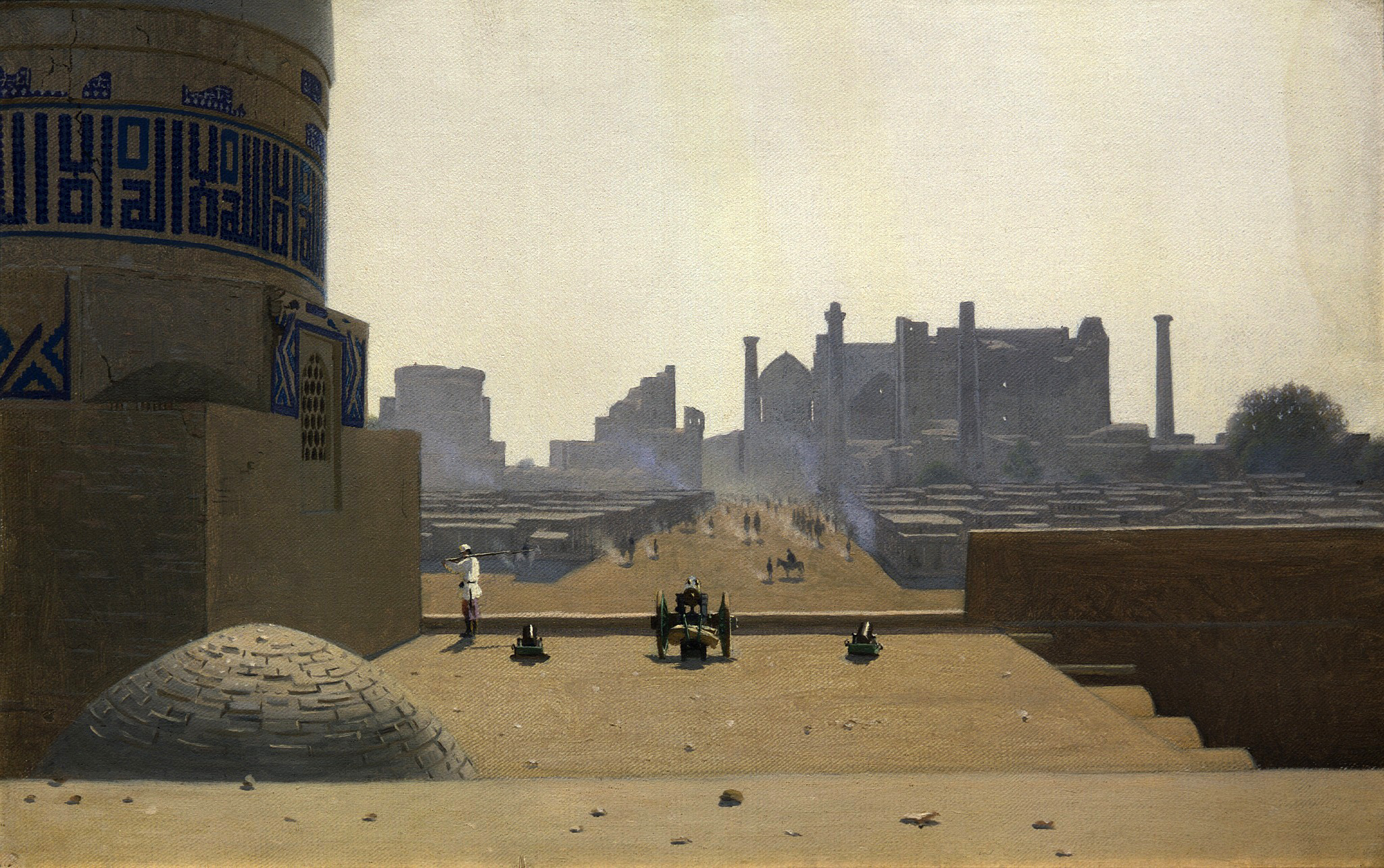
Main Street in Samarkand, from the height of the citadel in the early morning (1869–1870)

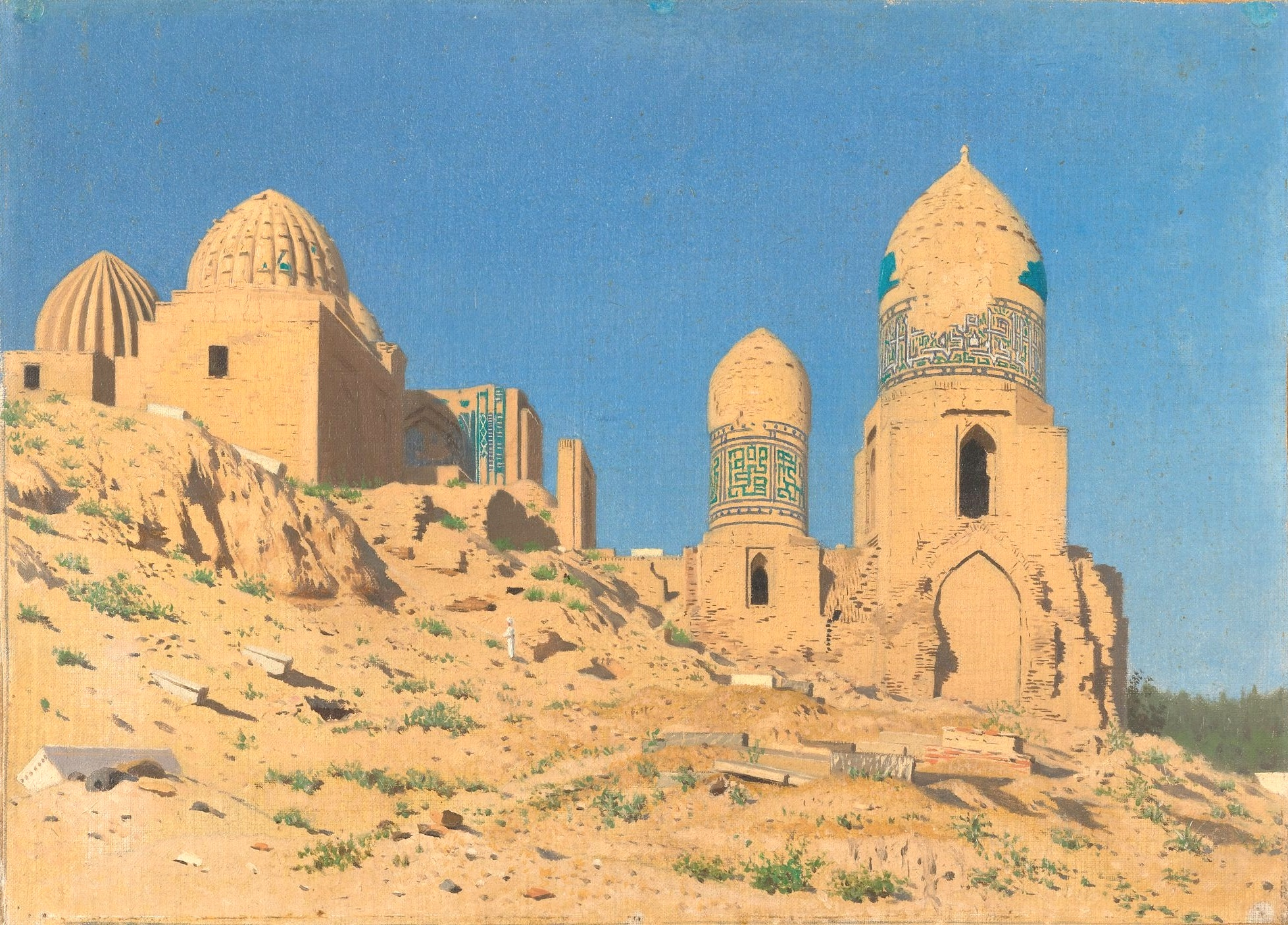
Shah-i-Zinda Mausoleum in Samarkand (1869–1870)

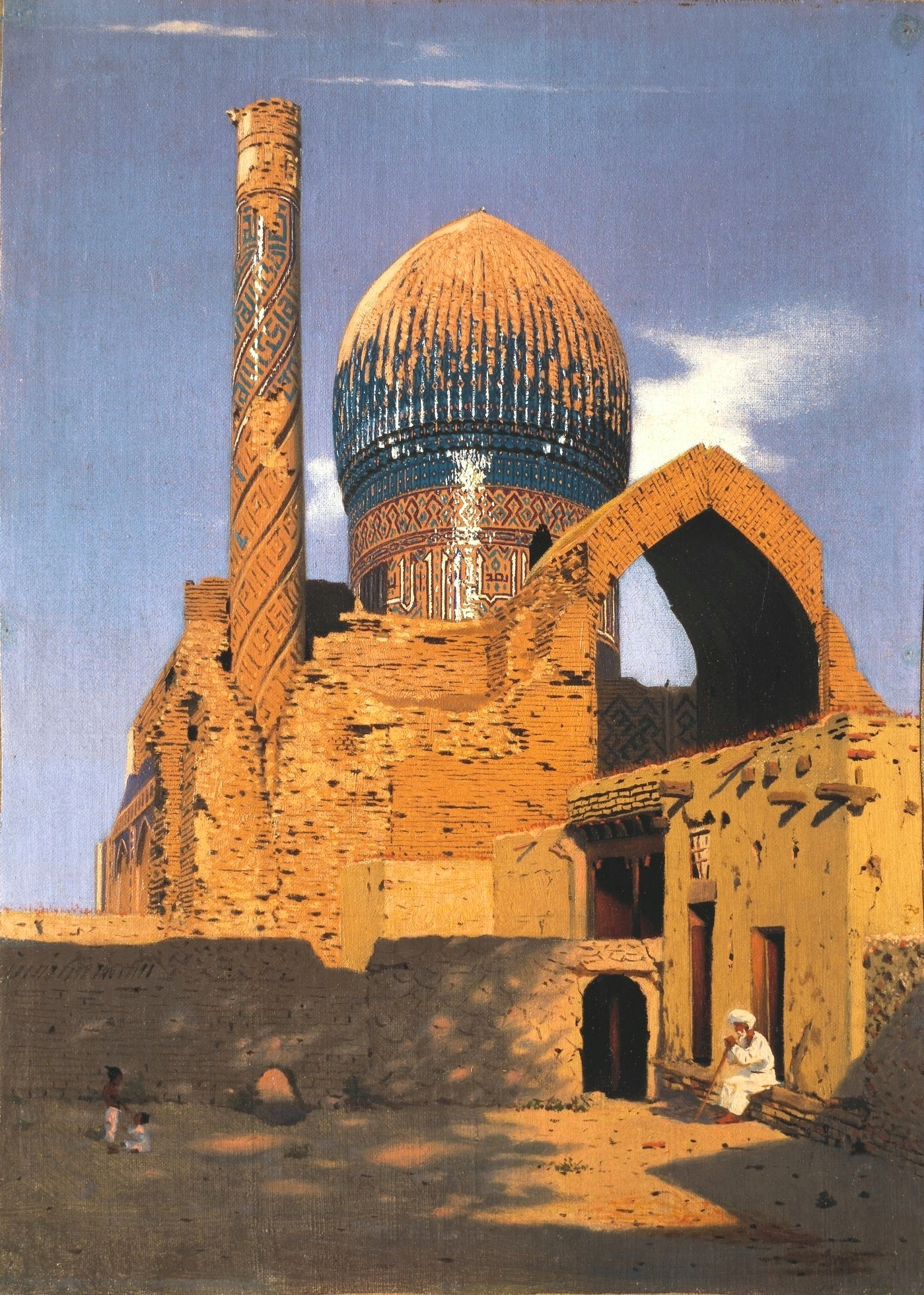
Gur-e-Amir mausoleum. Samarkand (1869–1870)

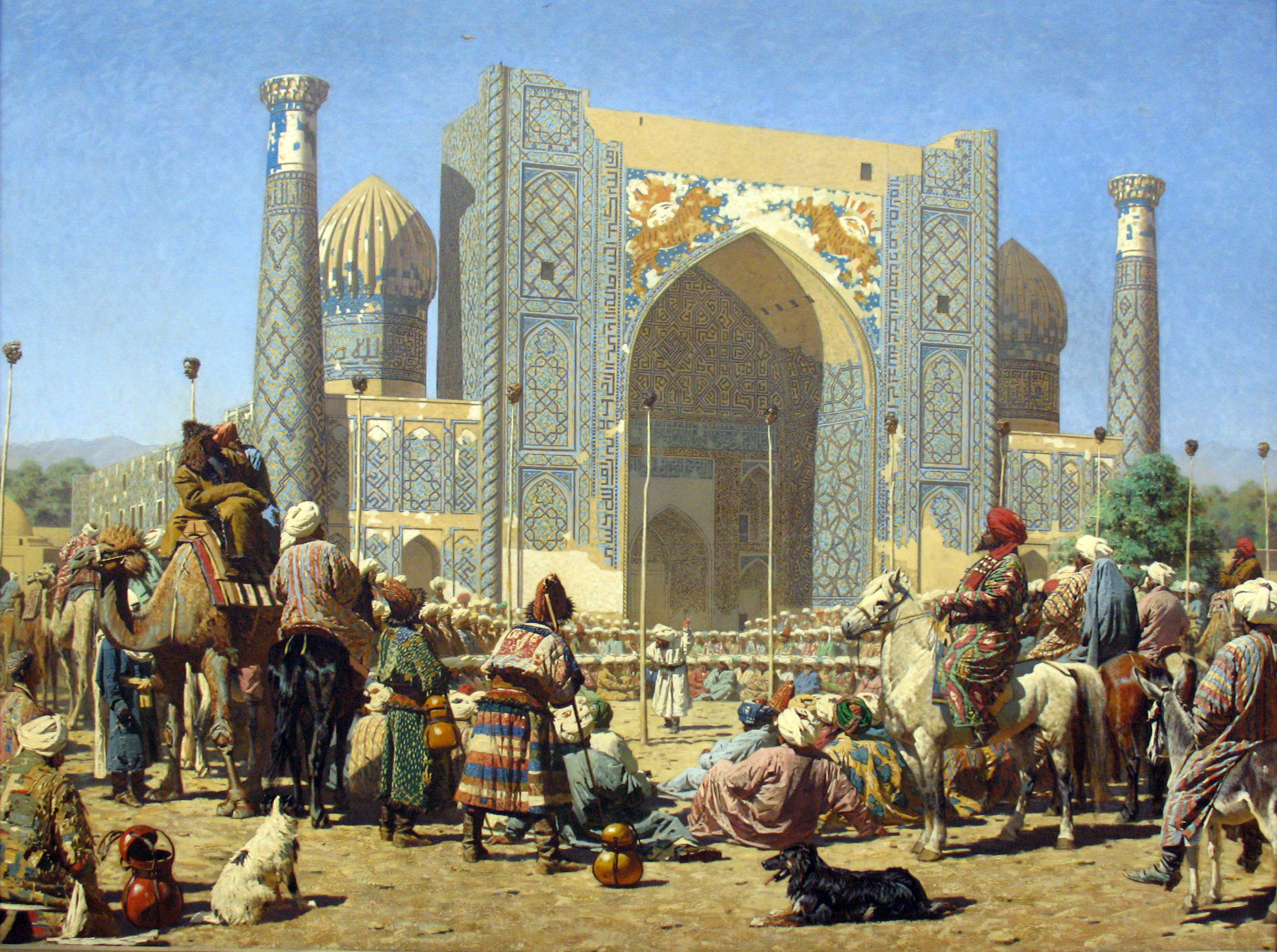
They are triumphant (1872). Registan. The Emir of Bukhara and the city's notables watch how the heads of Russian soldiers are impaled on poles.

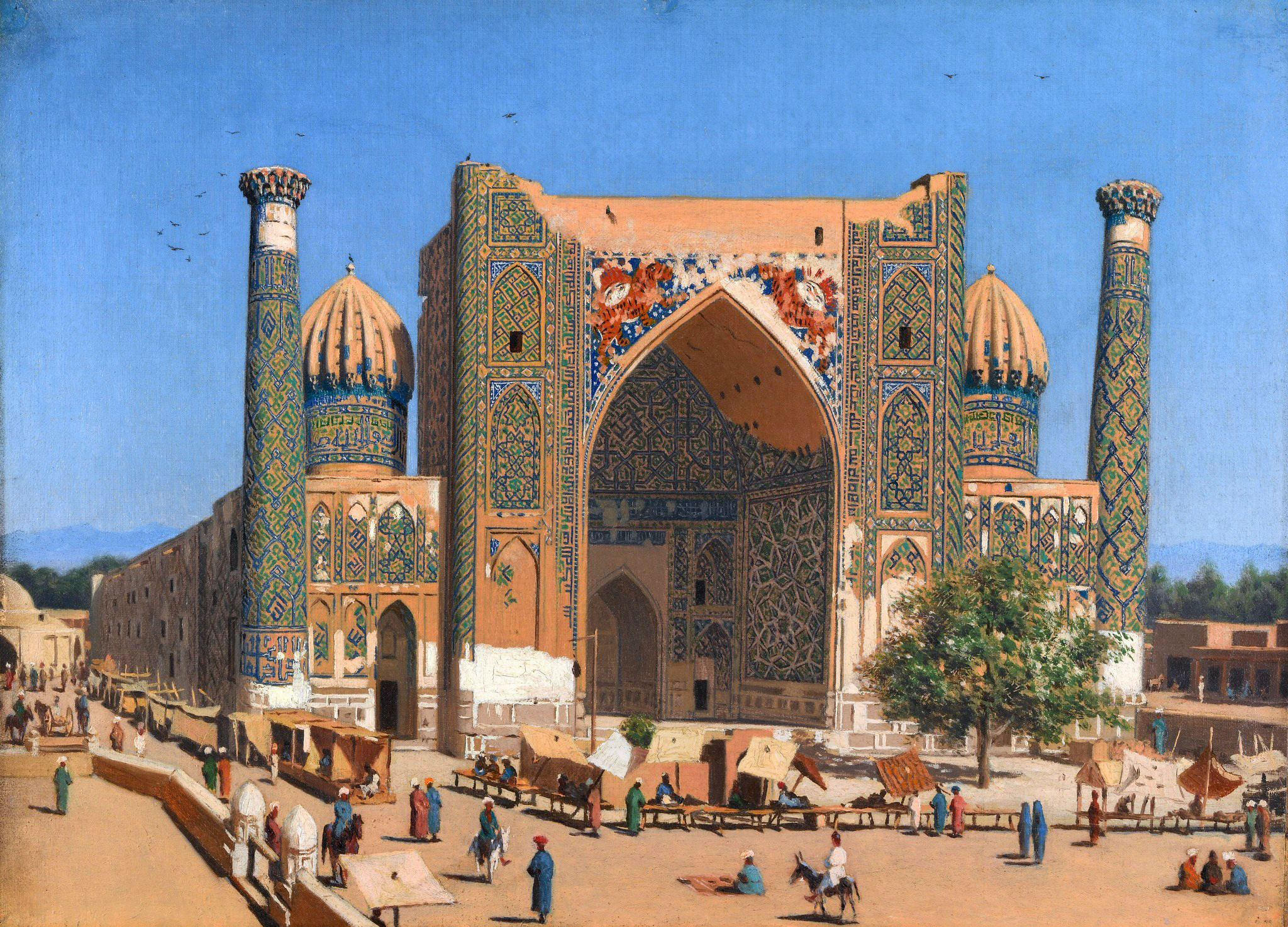
Sher-Dor Madrasa on Registan Square in Samarkand (1869–1870)

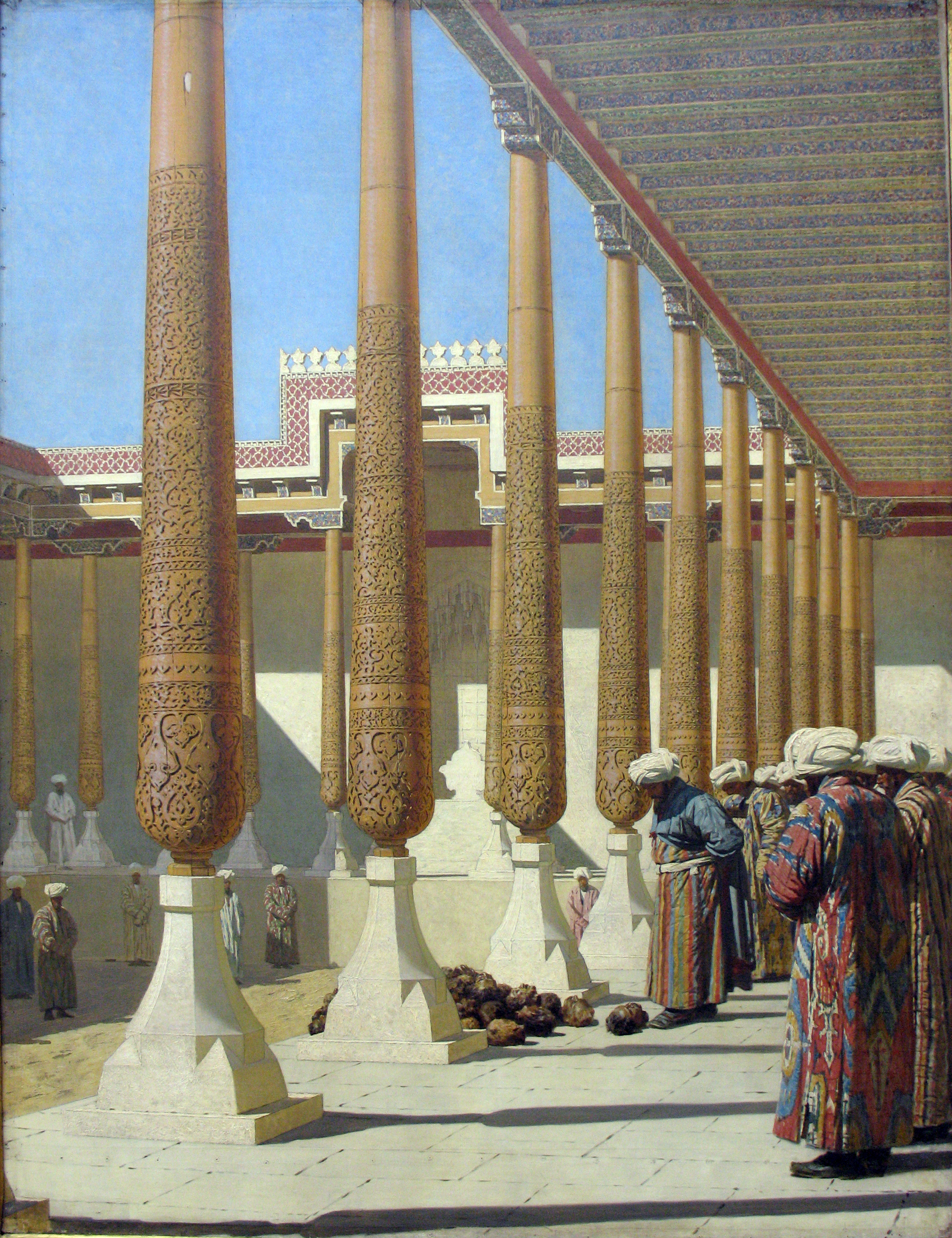
Presentation of the trophies (1872)

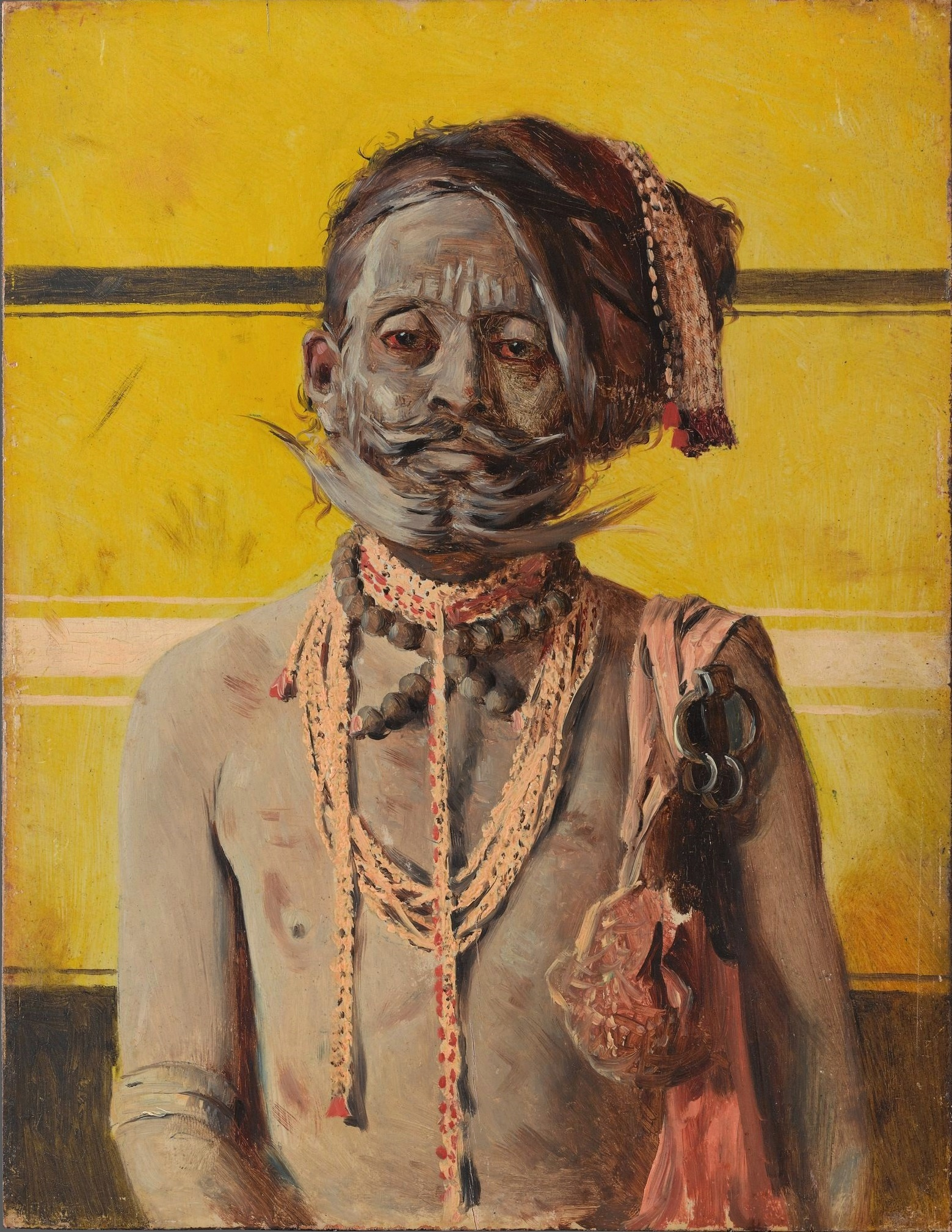
Fakir (1874–1876)

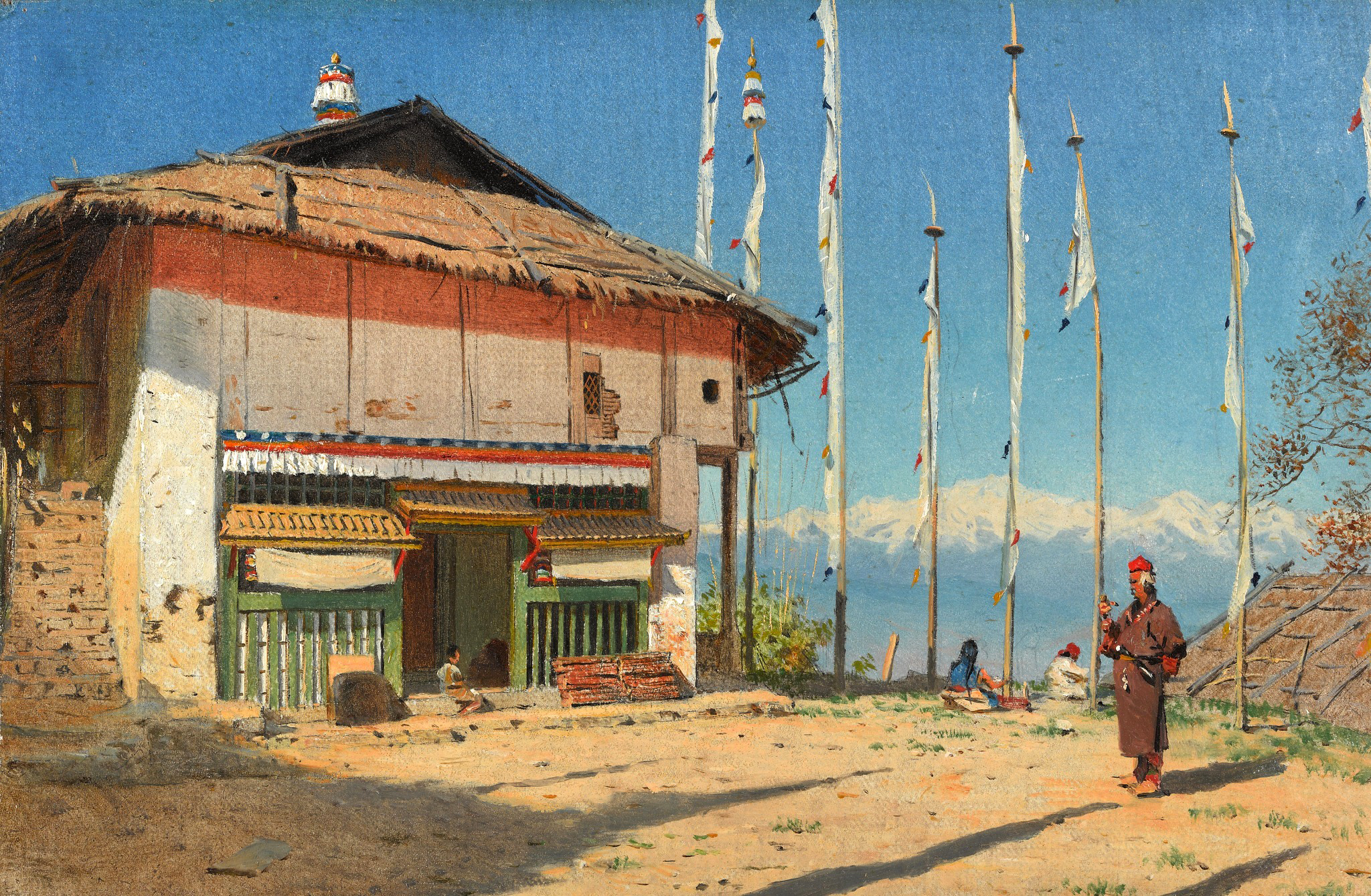
Buddhist temple in Darjiling. Sikkim (1874)

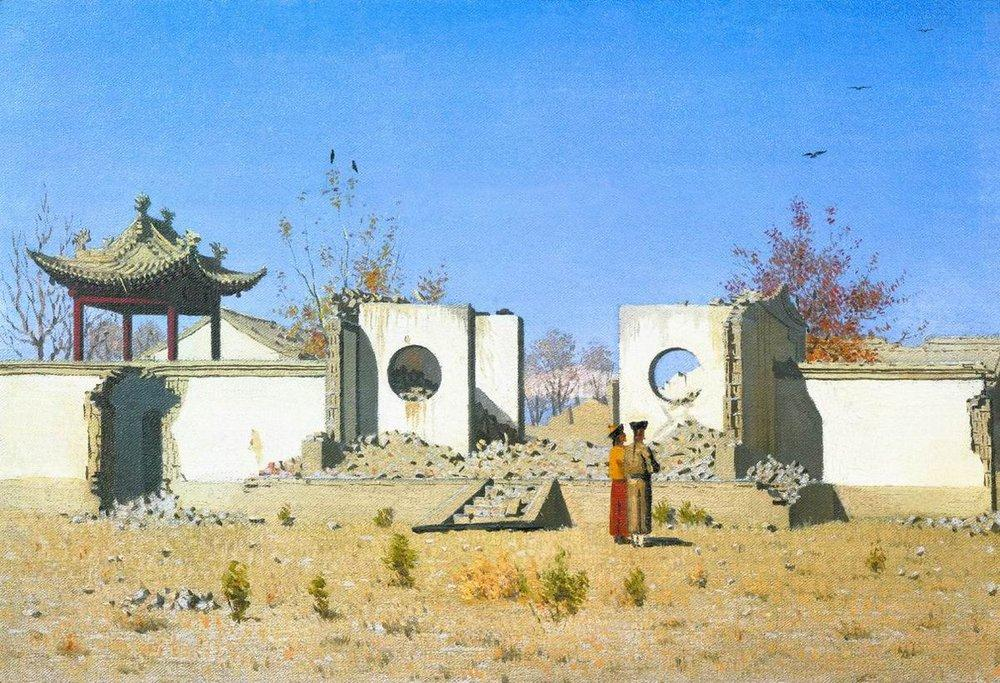
Ruins of Chinese sanctuary. Ak-Kent (Kazakhstan) (1869–1870)

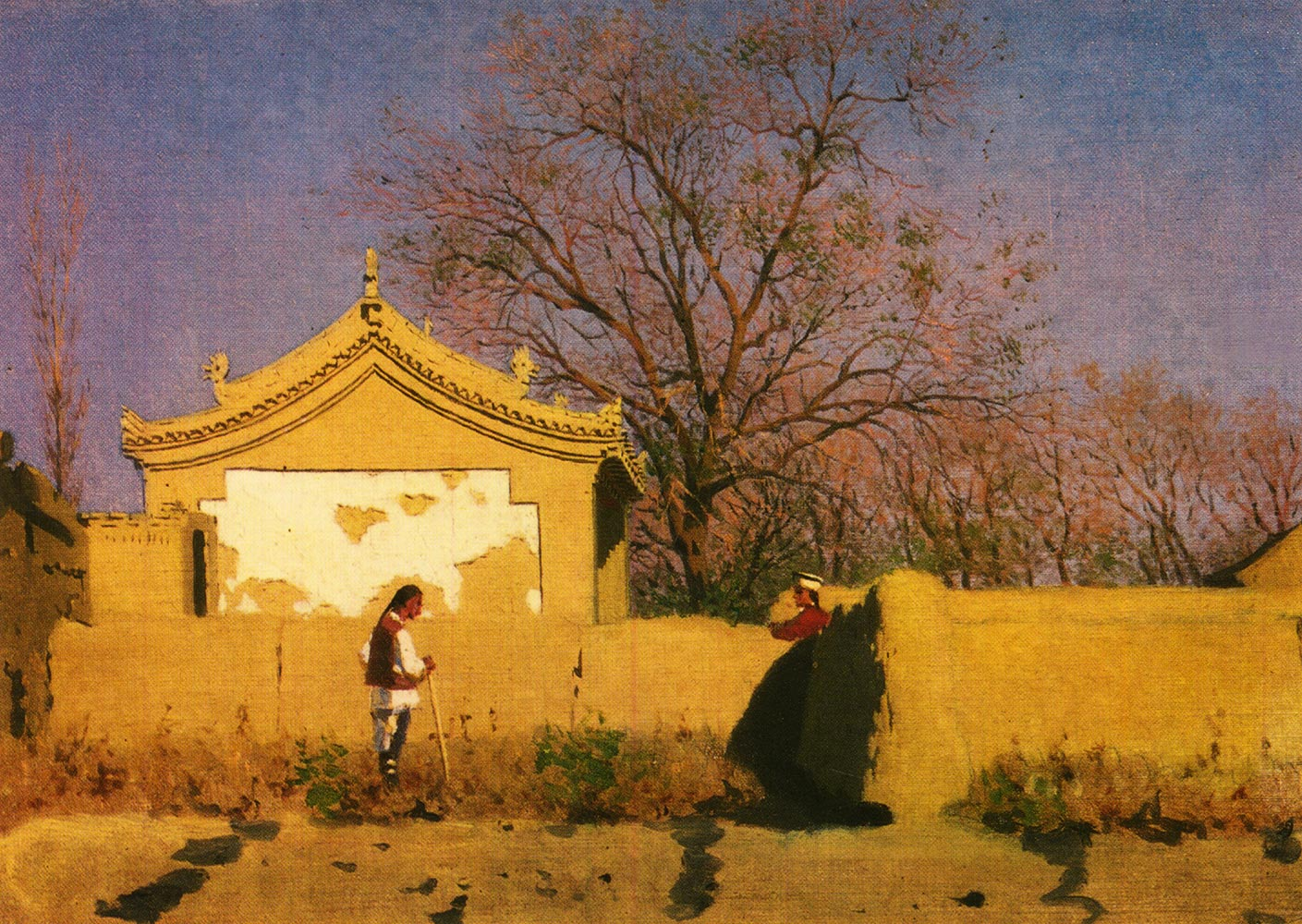
Chinese house (1869–1870)

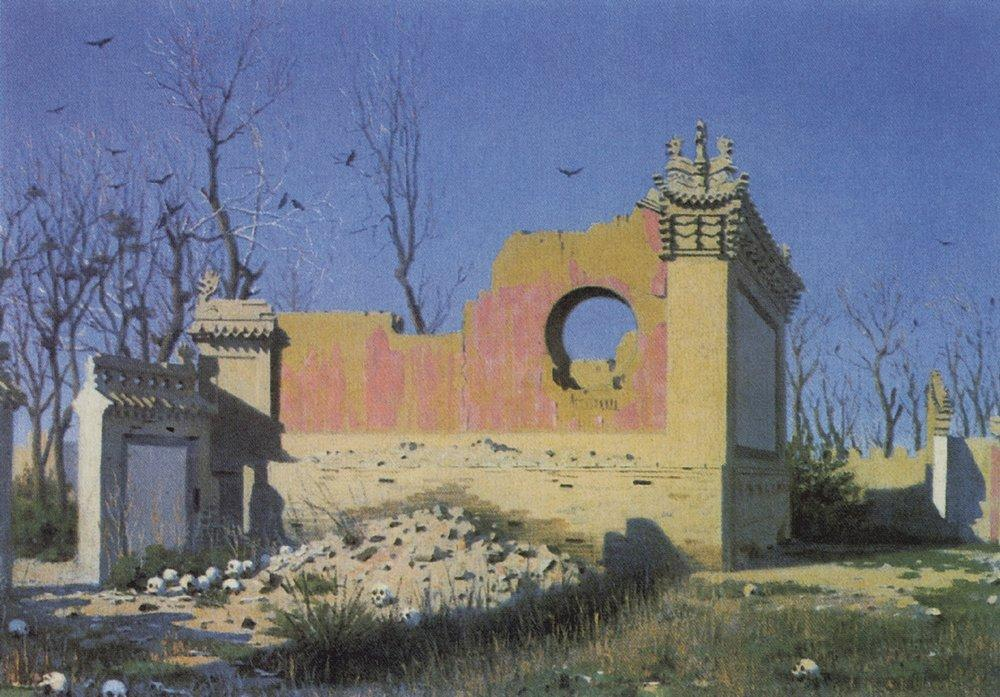
Ruins of a Theater in Chuguchak (1869–1870)

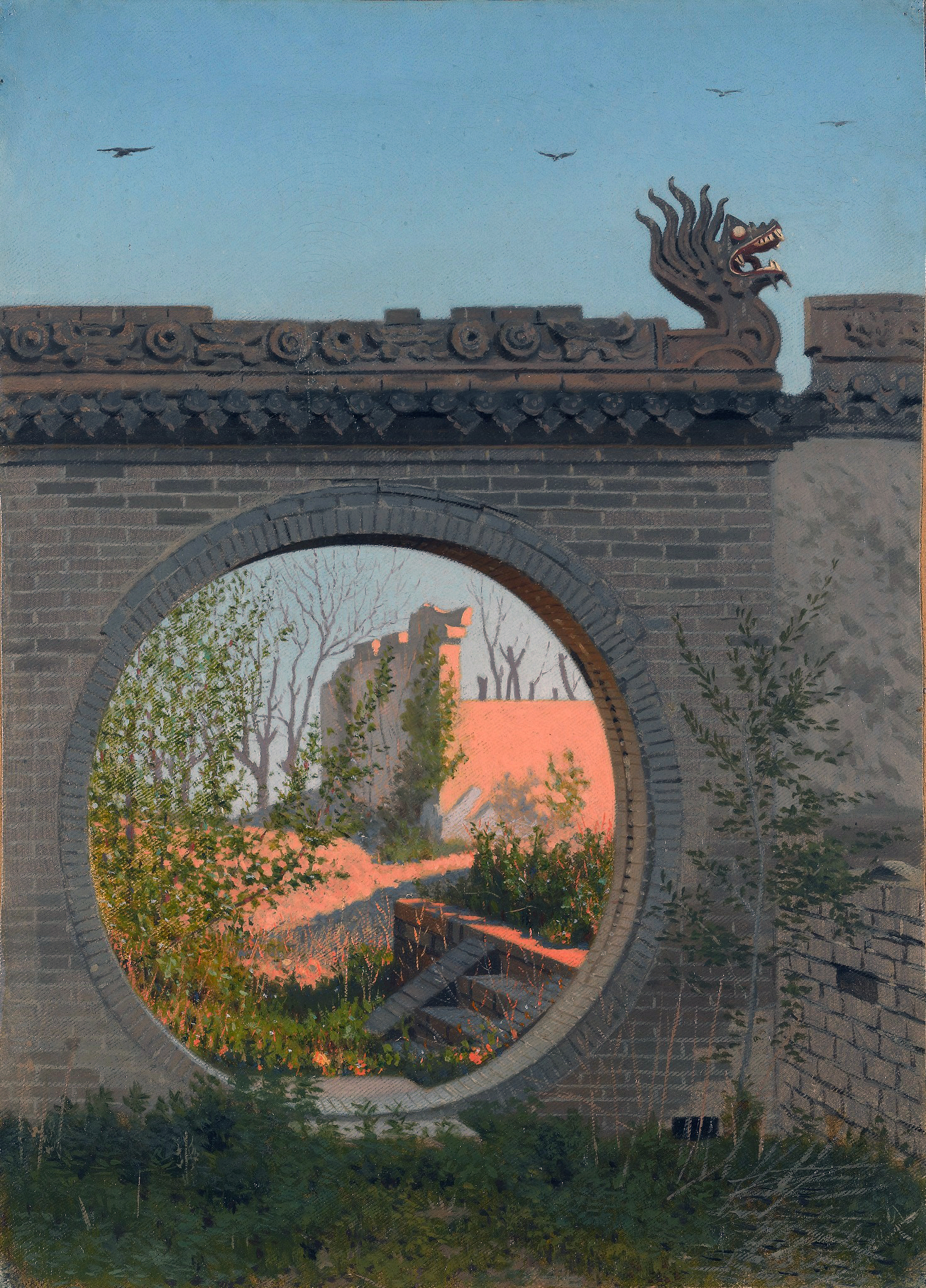
A Garden gate in Chuguchak (1869–1870)

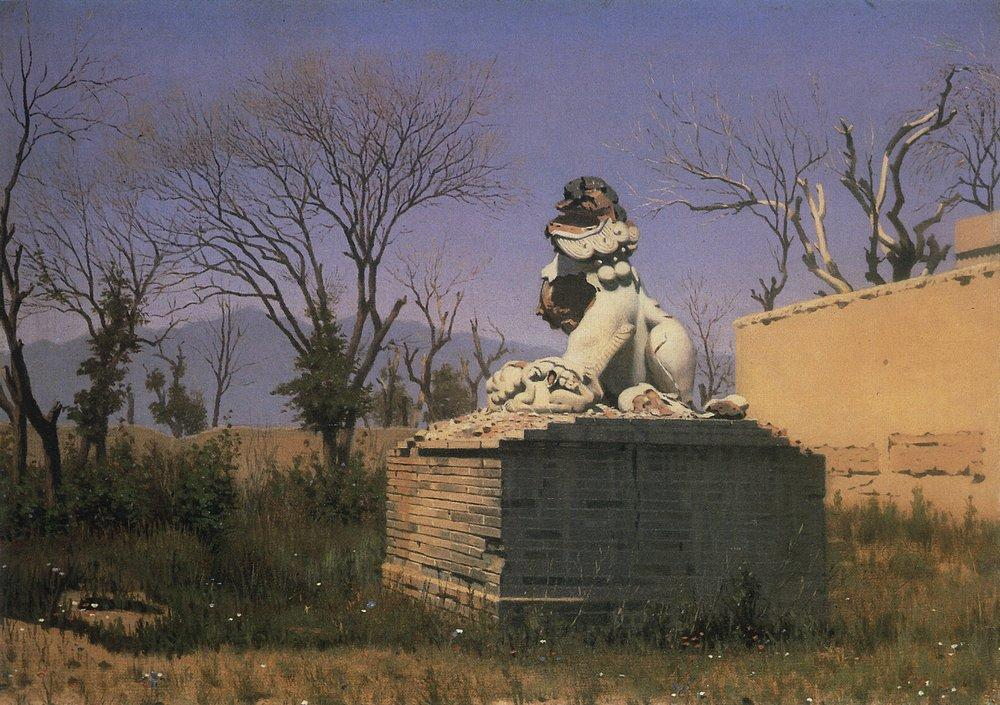
Ruins in Chuguchak (1869–1870)

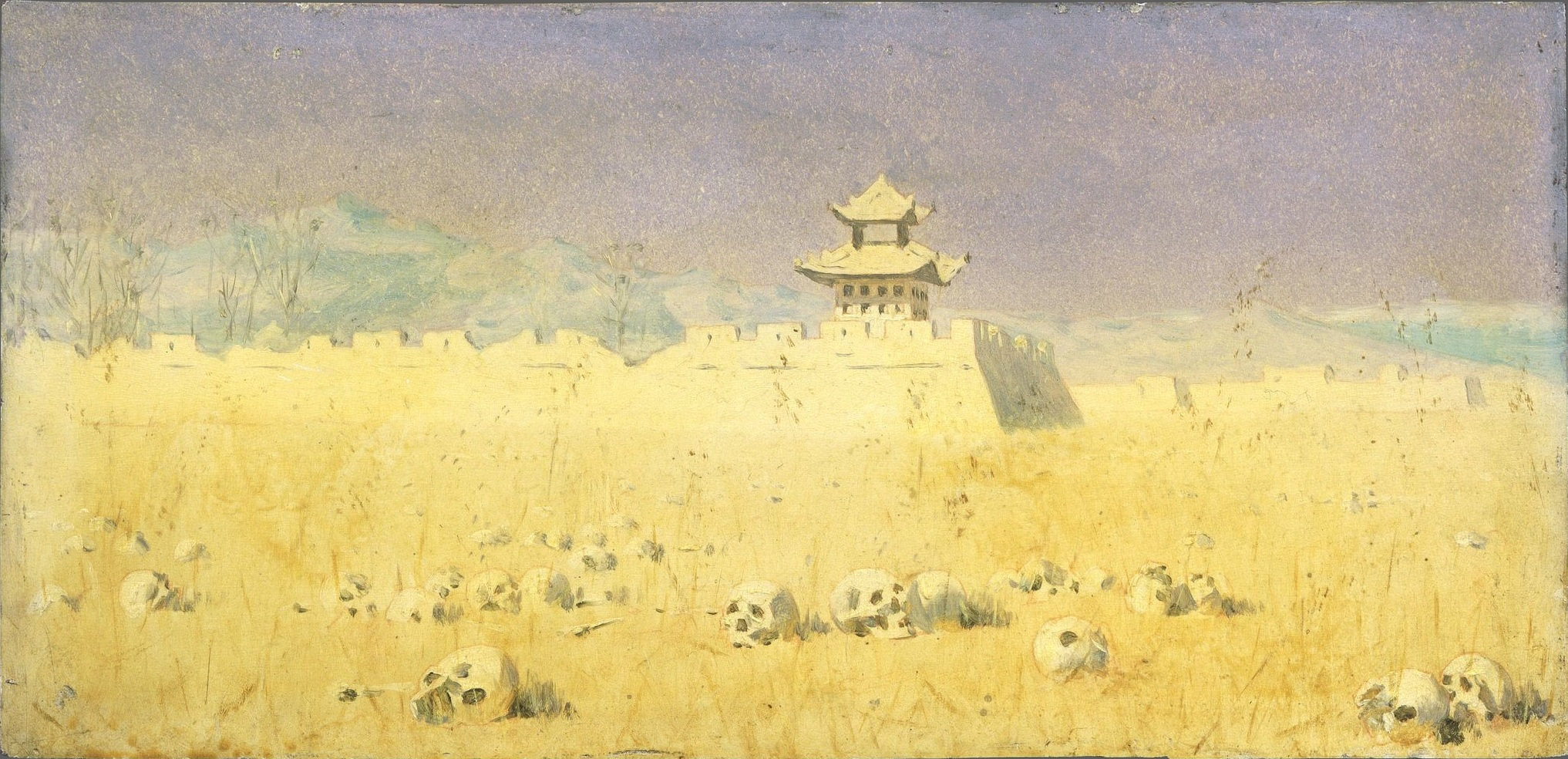
Ruins in Chuguchak (1869–1870)

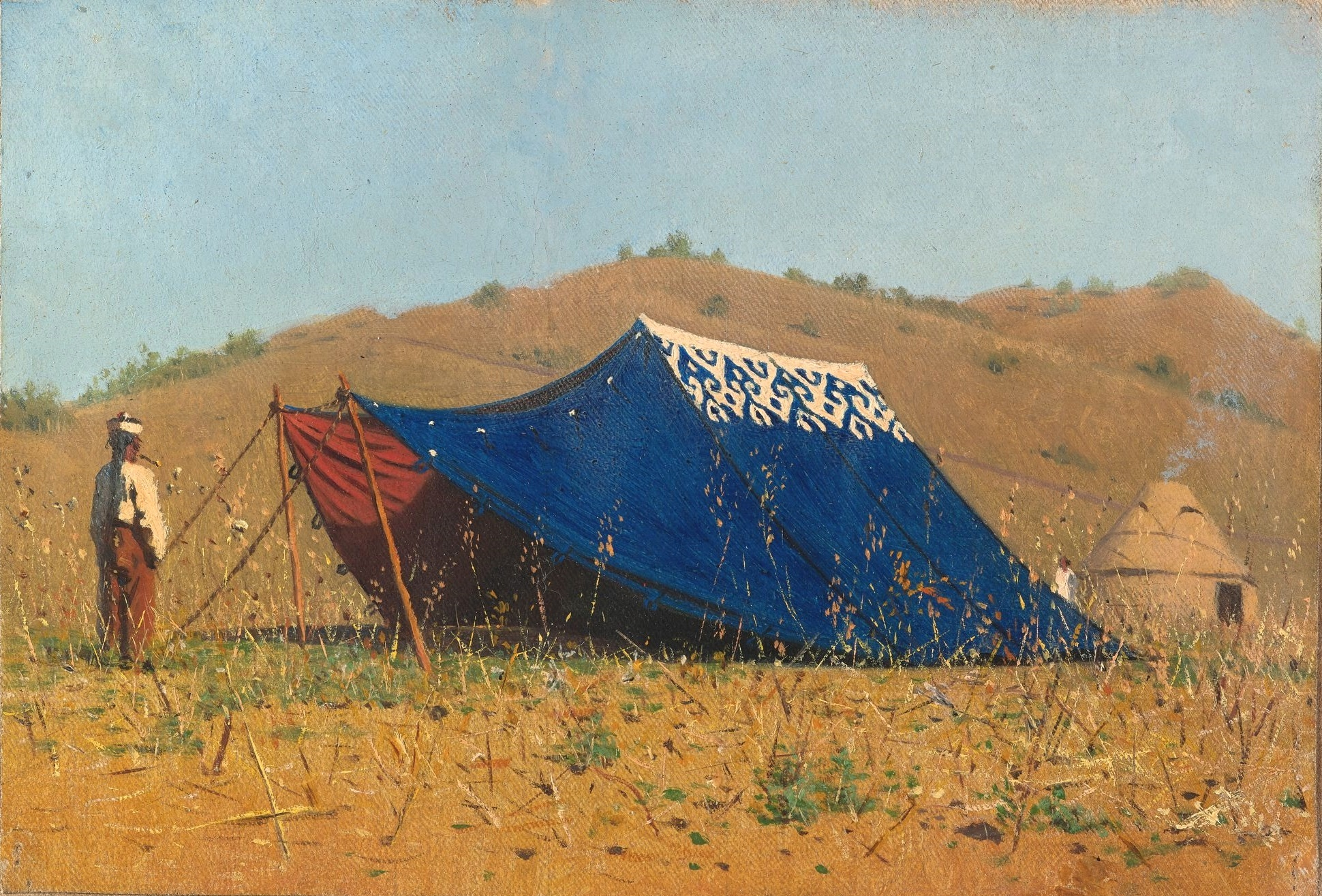
Chinese tent (1869–1870)

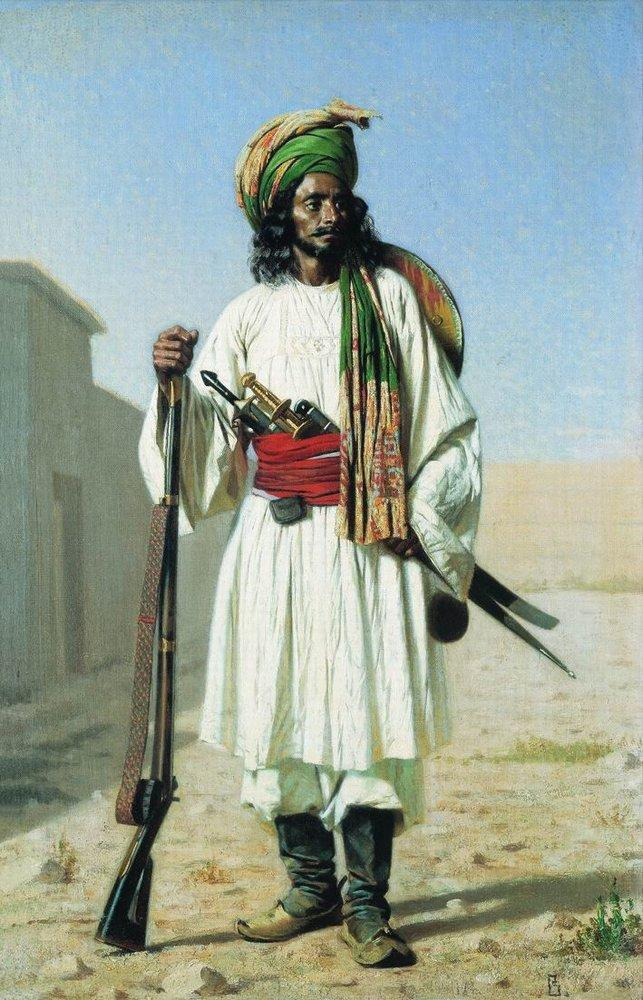
Afghan (1868)

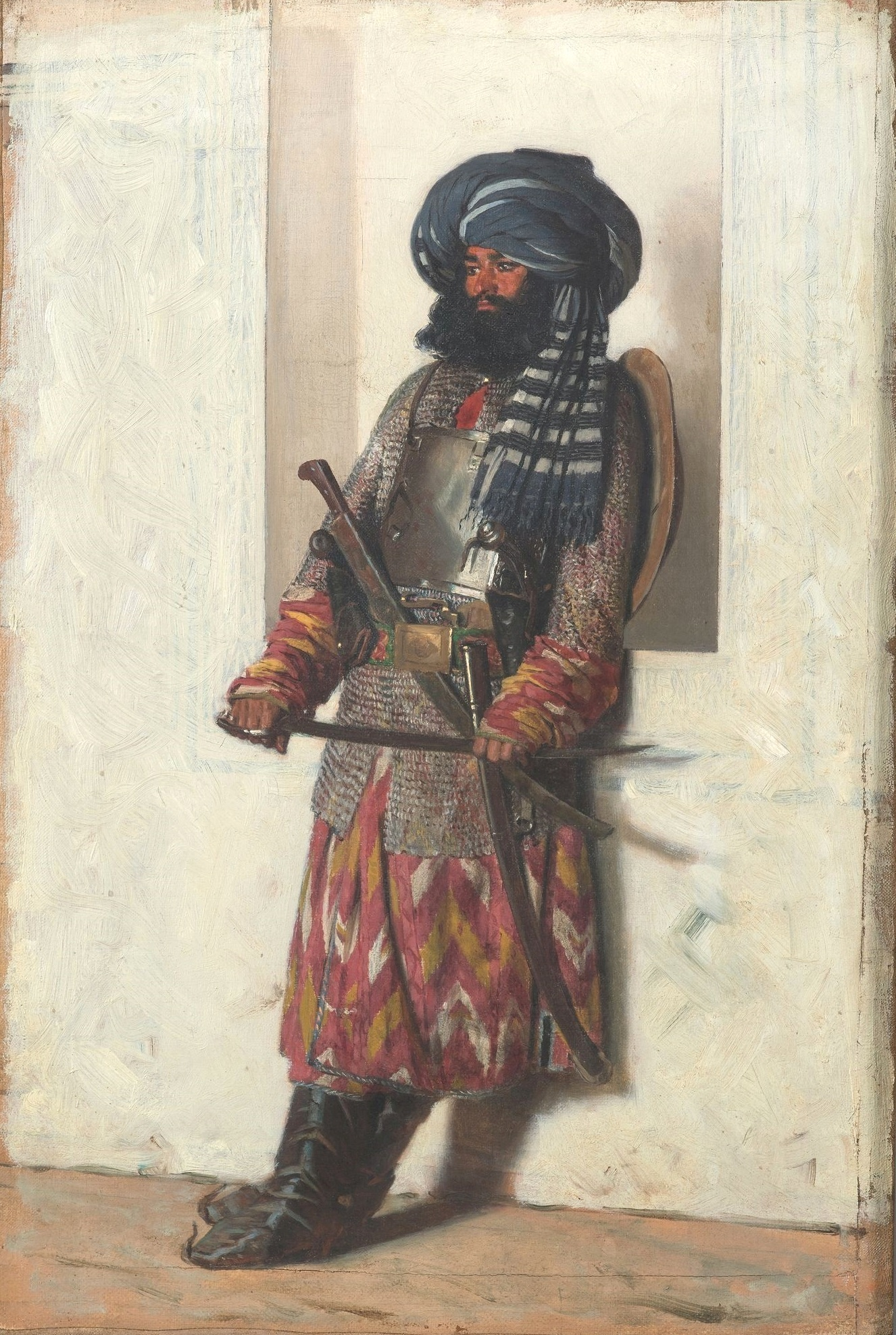
Afghan (1869–1870)

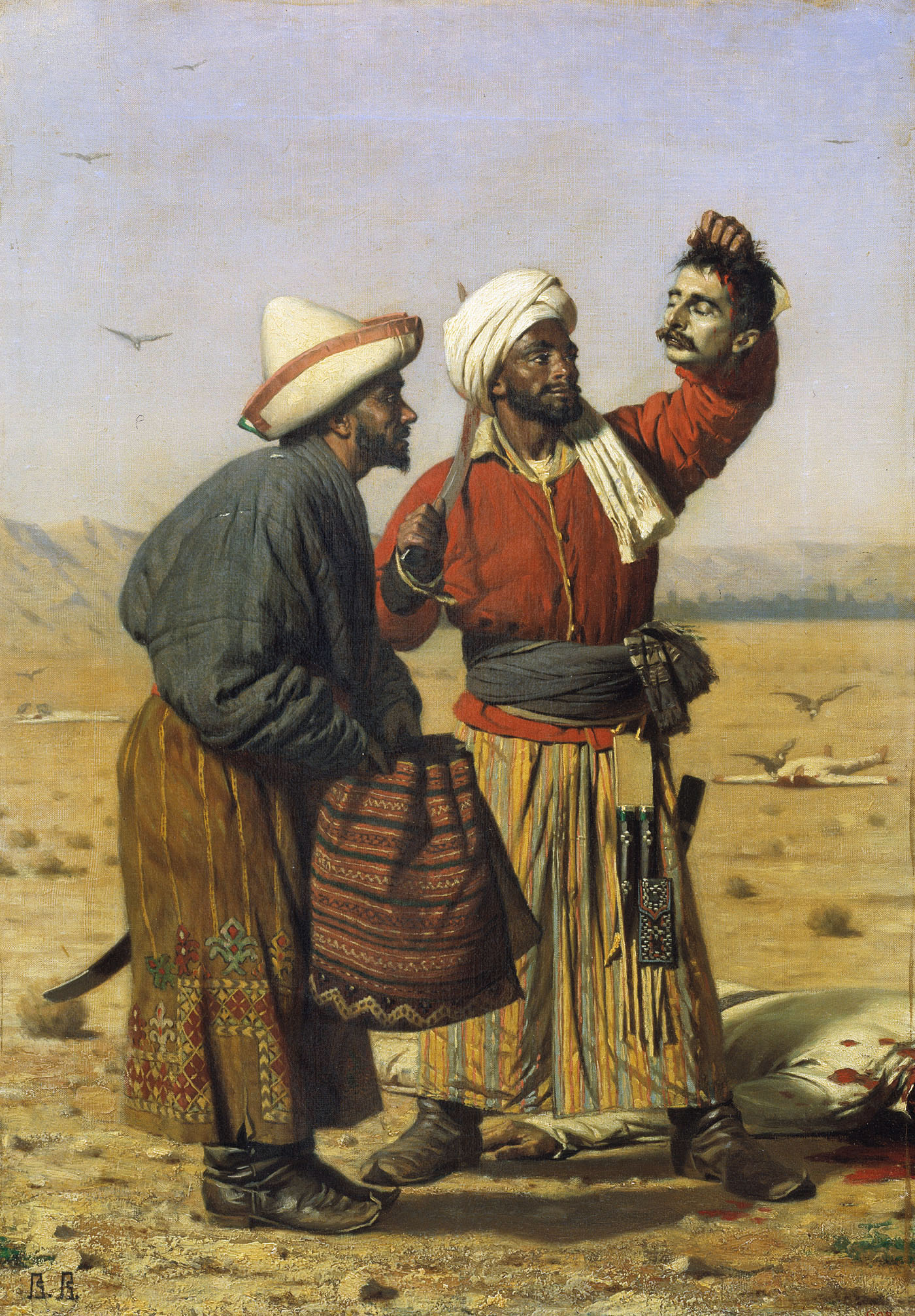
After a success (1868)

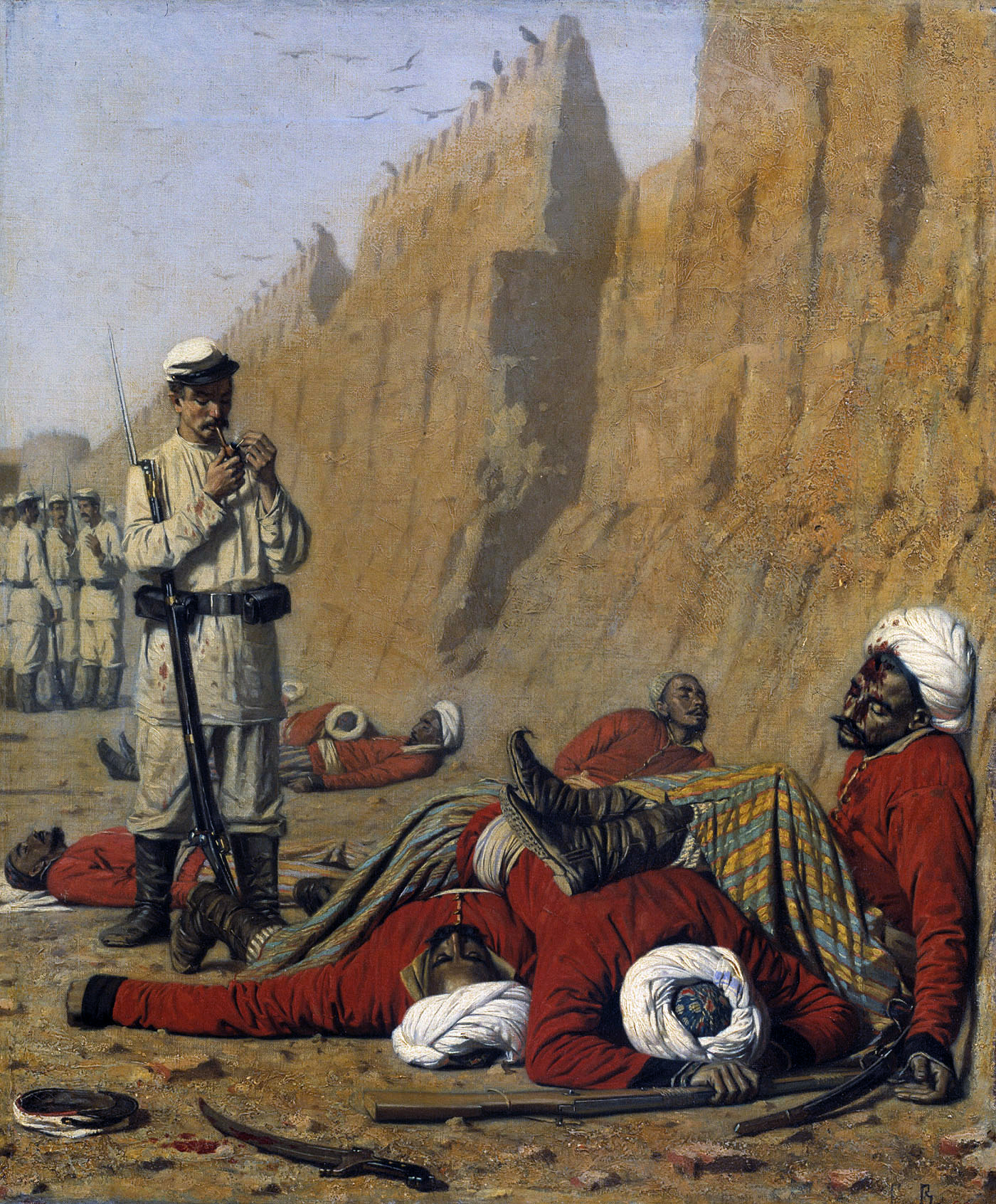
After an unsuccess (1868)

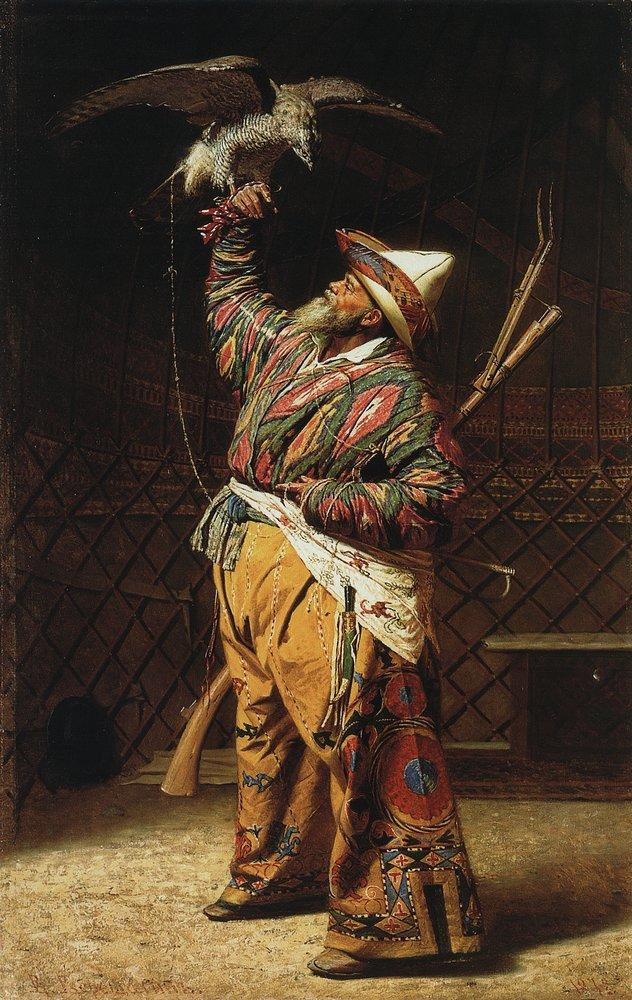
A rich Kyrgyz hunter with a falcon (1871)

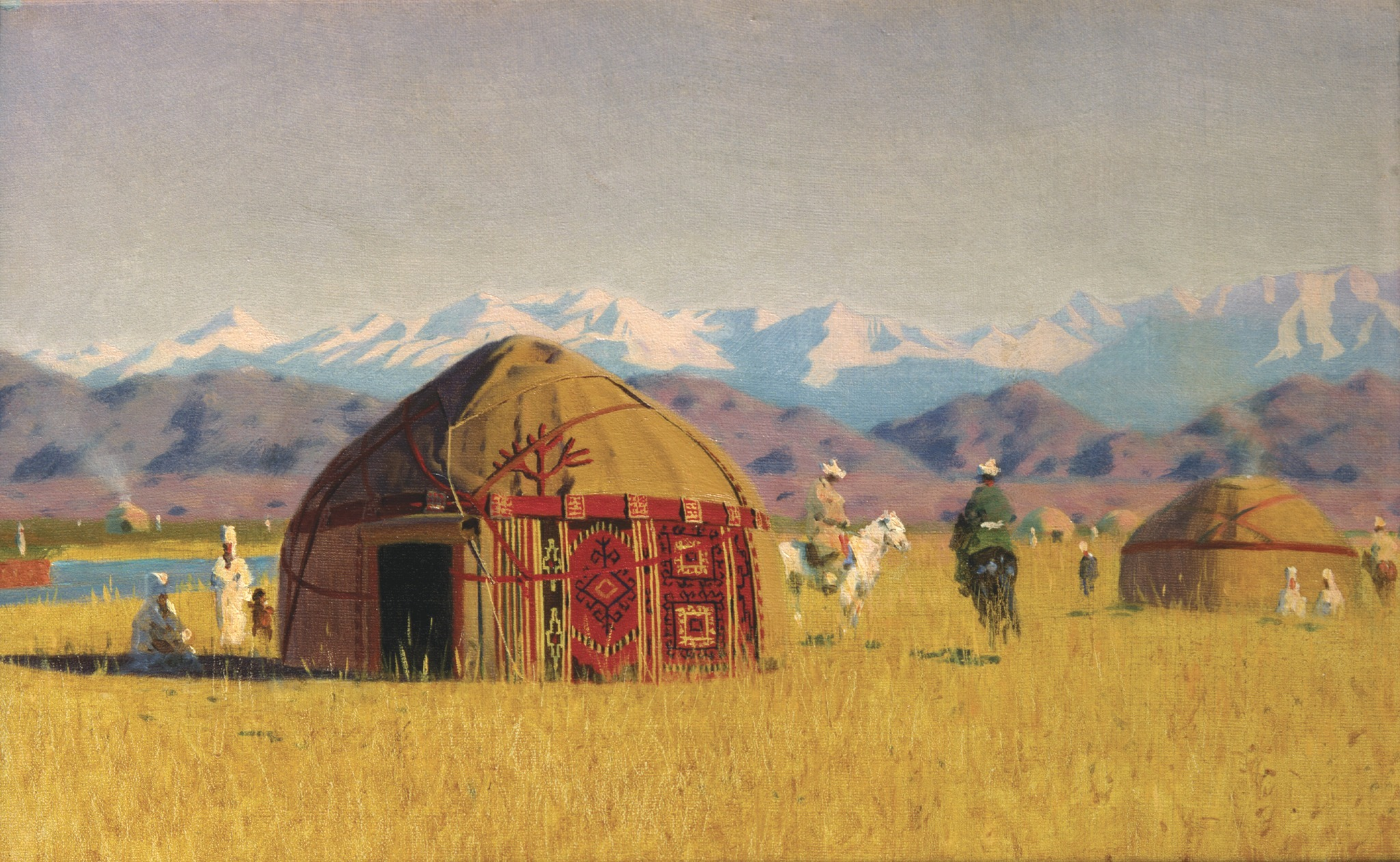
Kyrgyz yurts on the Chu River (1869–1870)

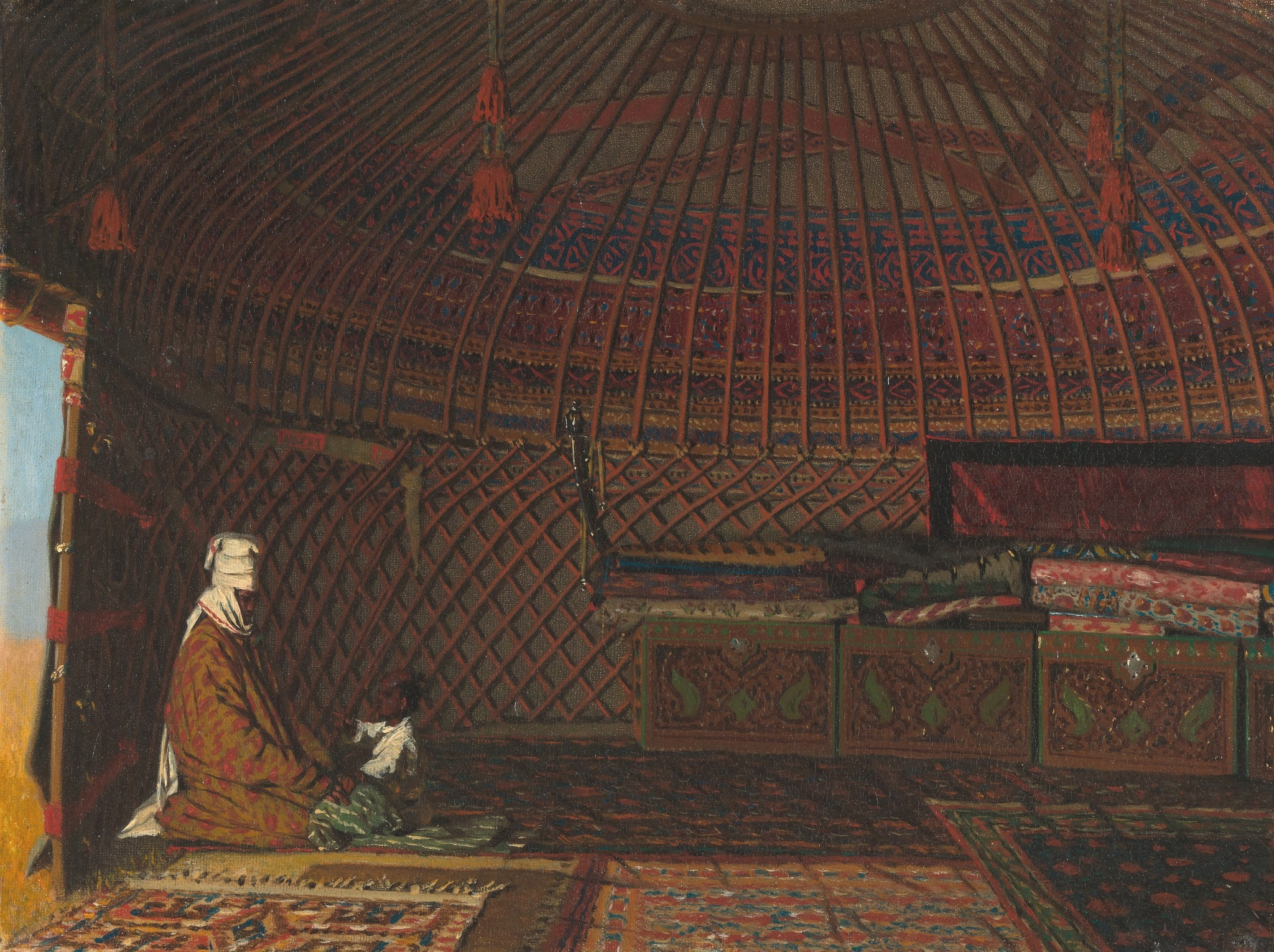
Inside the tent of a rich Kyrgyz (1869–1870)

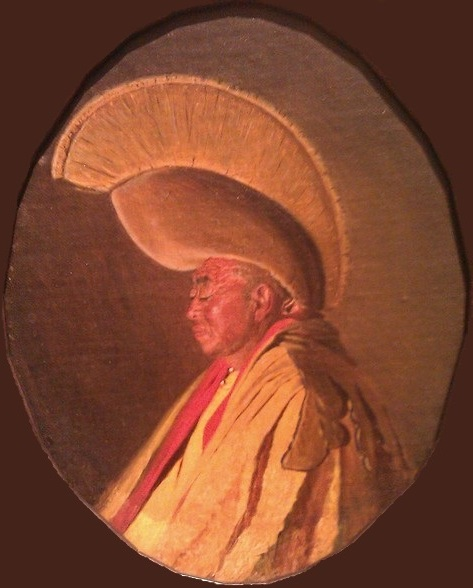
Oirat (Kalmyk) Lama wearing a ritual headdress (1869–1870)

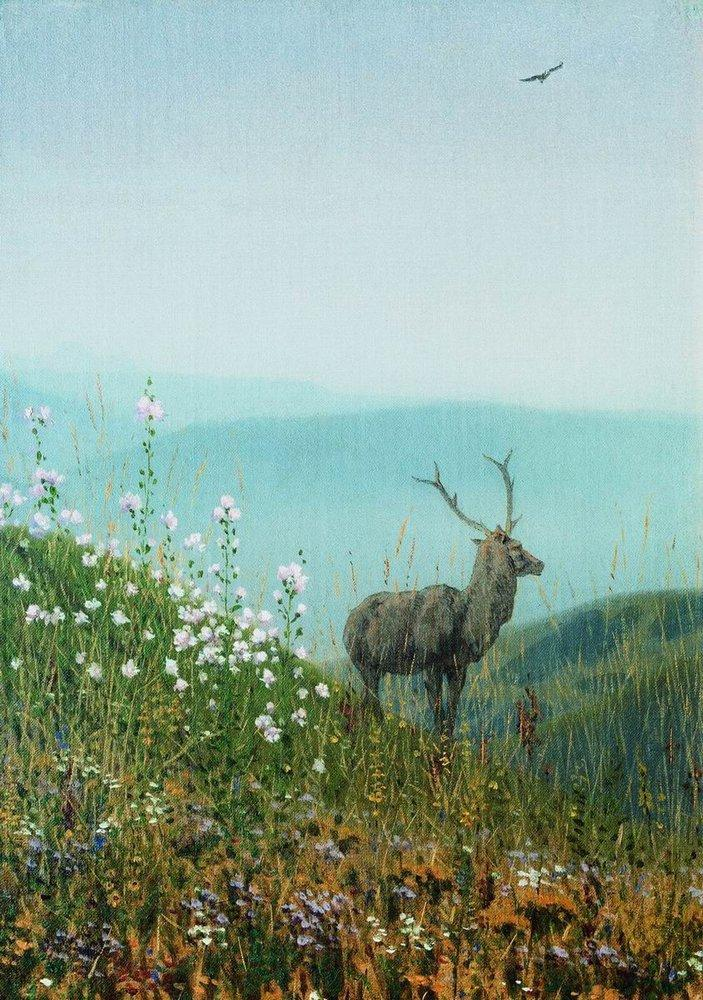
In the Alatau Mountains (1869–1870)

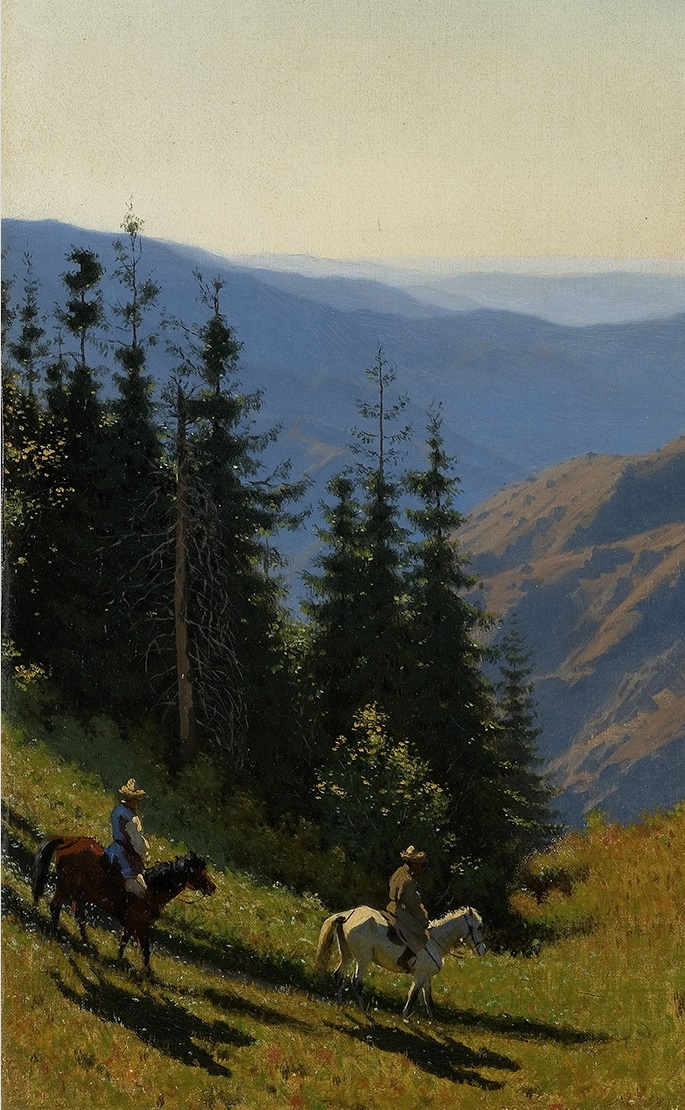
In the Alatau Mountains (1869–1870)

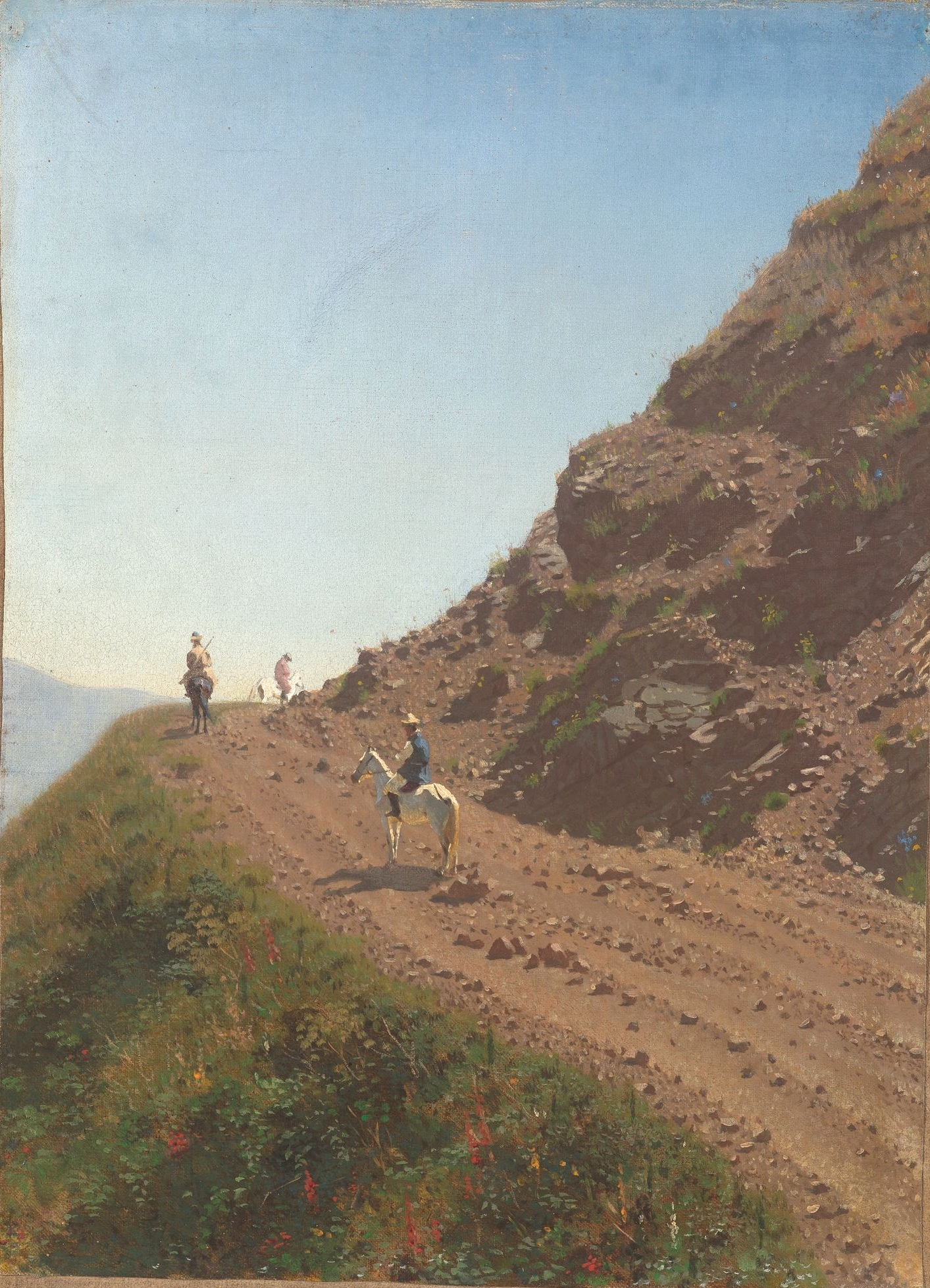
Nomadic road in the Alatau Mountains (1869–1870)

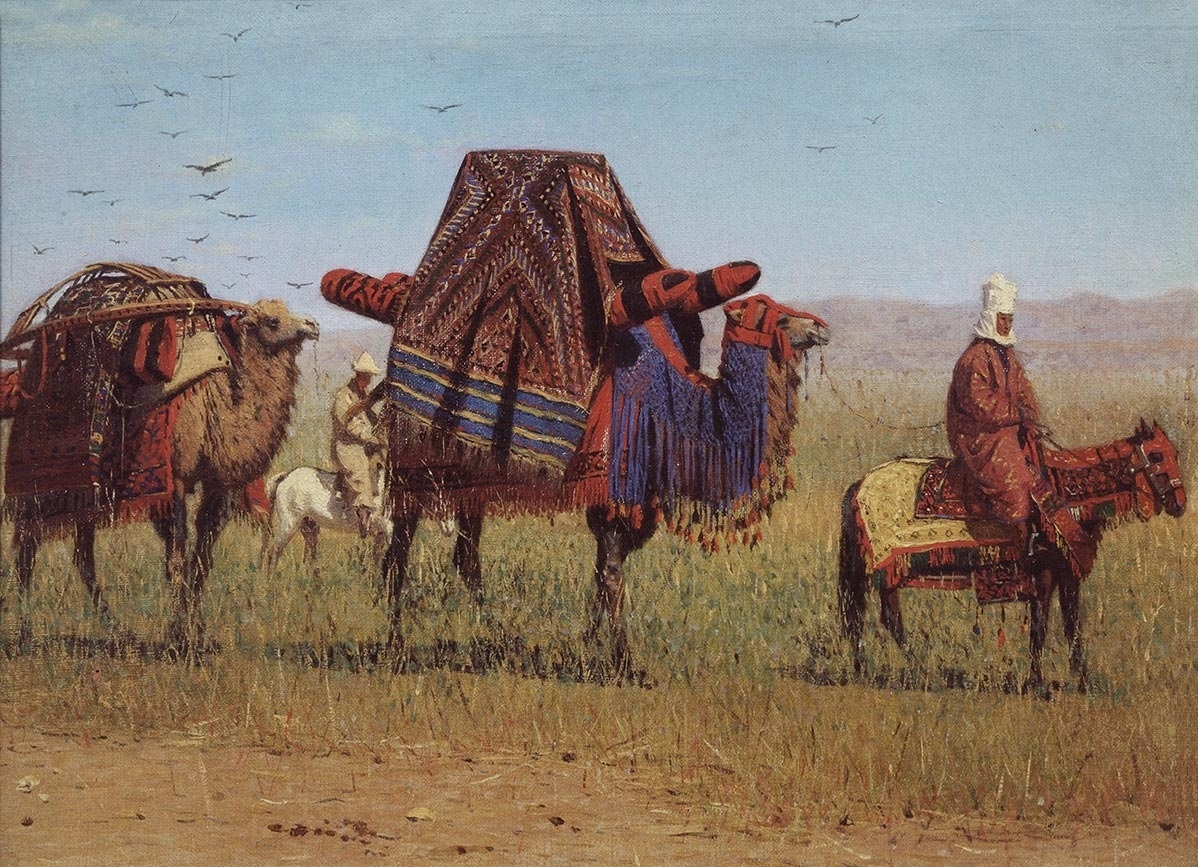
Kyrgyz migration (1869–1870)

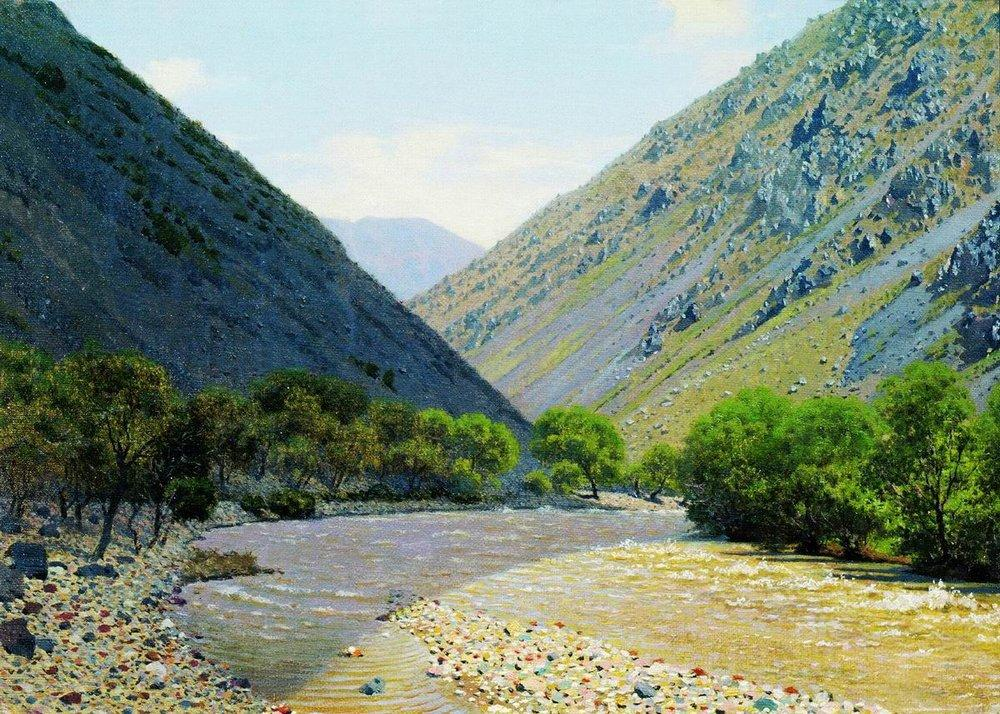
Barskaun Passage (1869–1870)

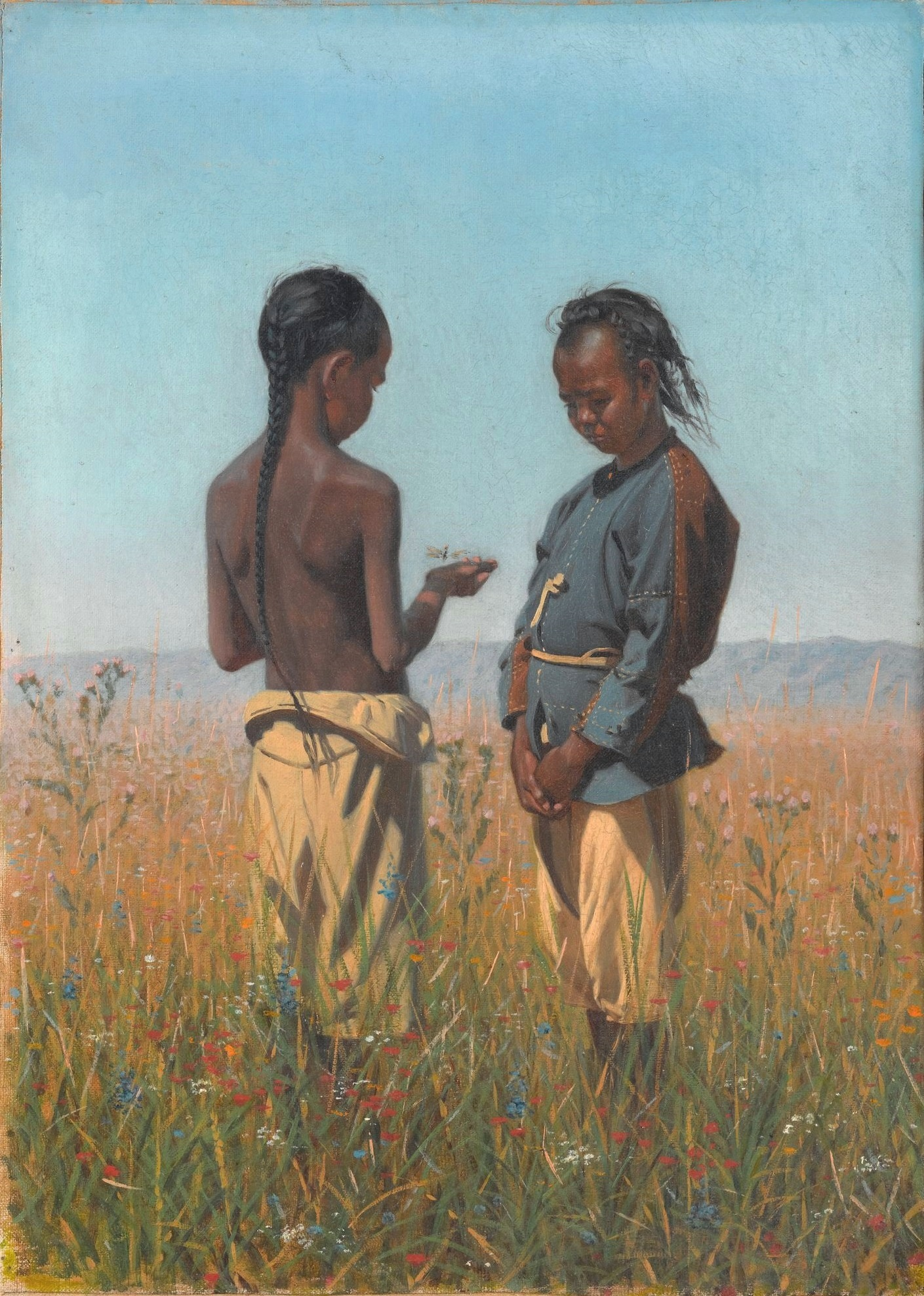
The children of the Solon tribe (1869–1870)

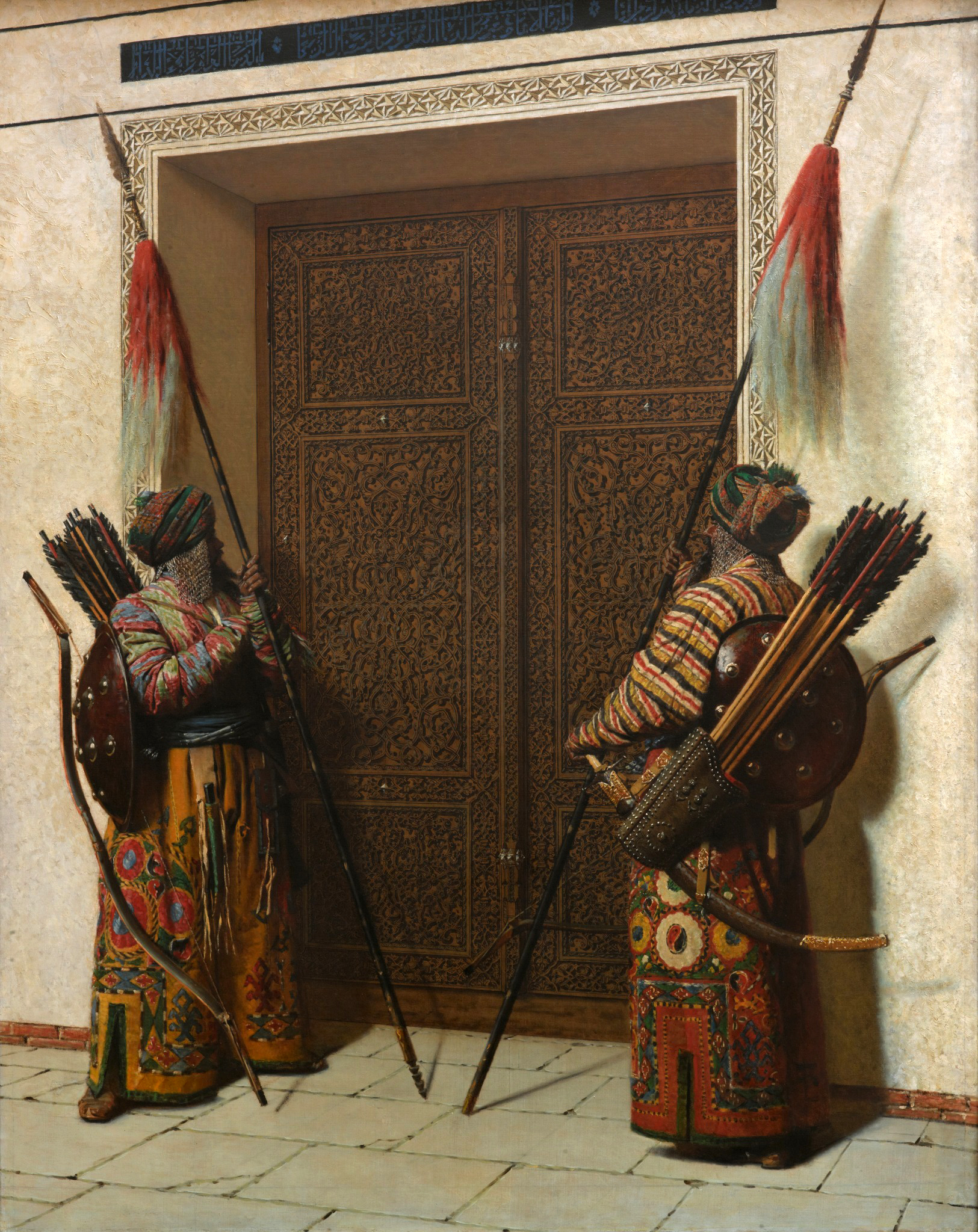
Timur's (Tamerlane's) doors (1872)

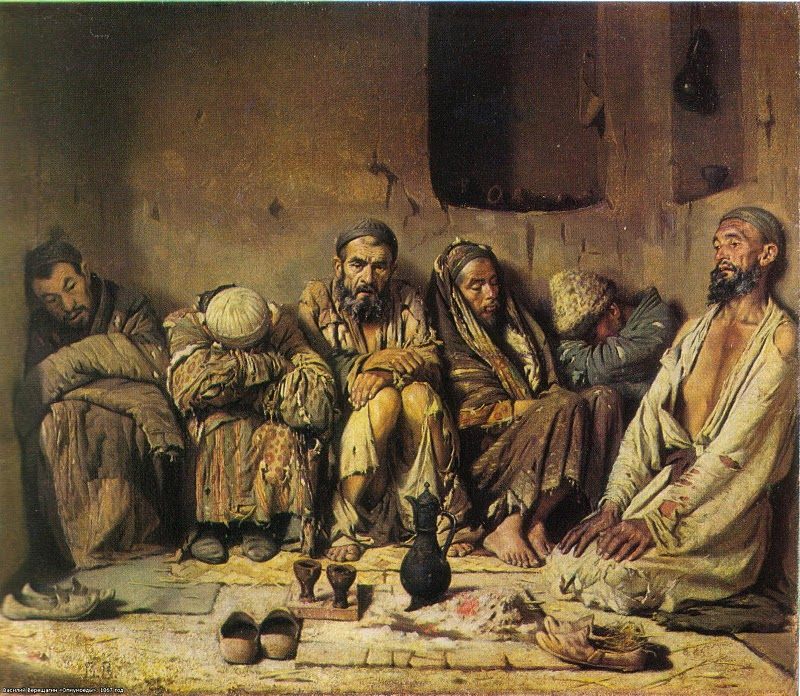
Opium-eaters (1868)

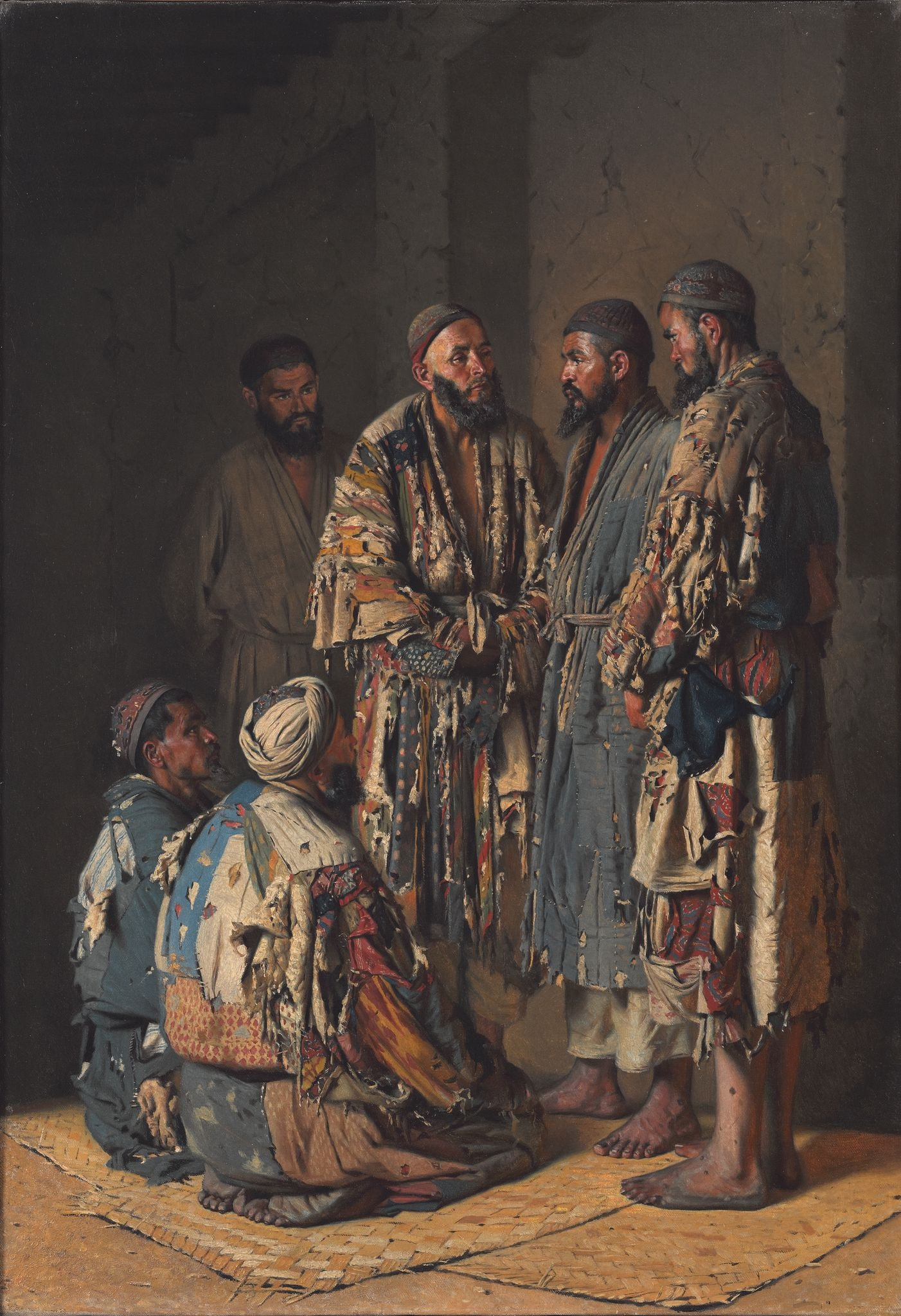
Politicians in opium shop. Tashkent (1870)

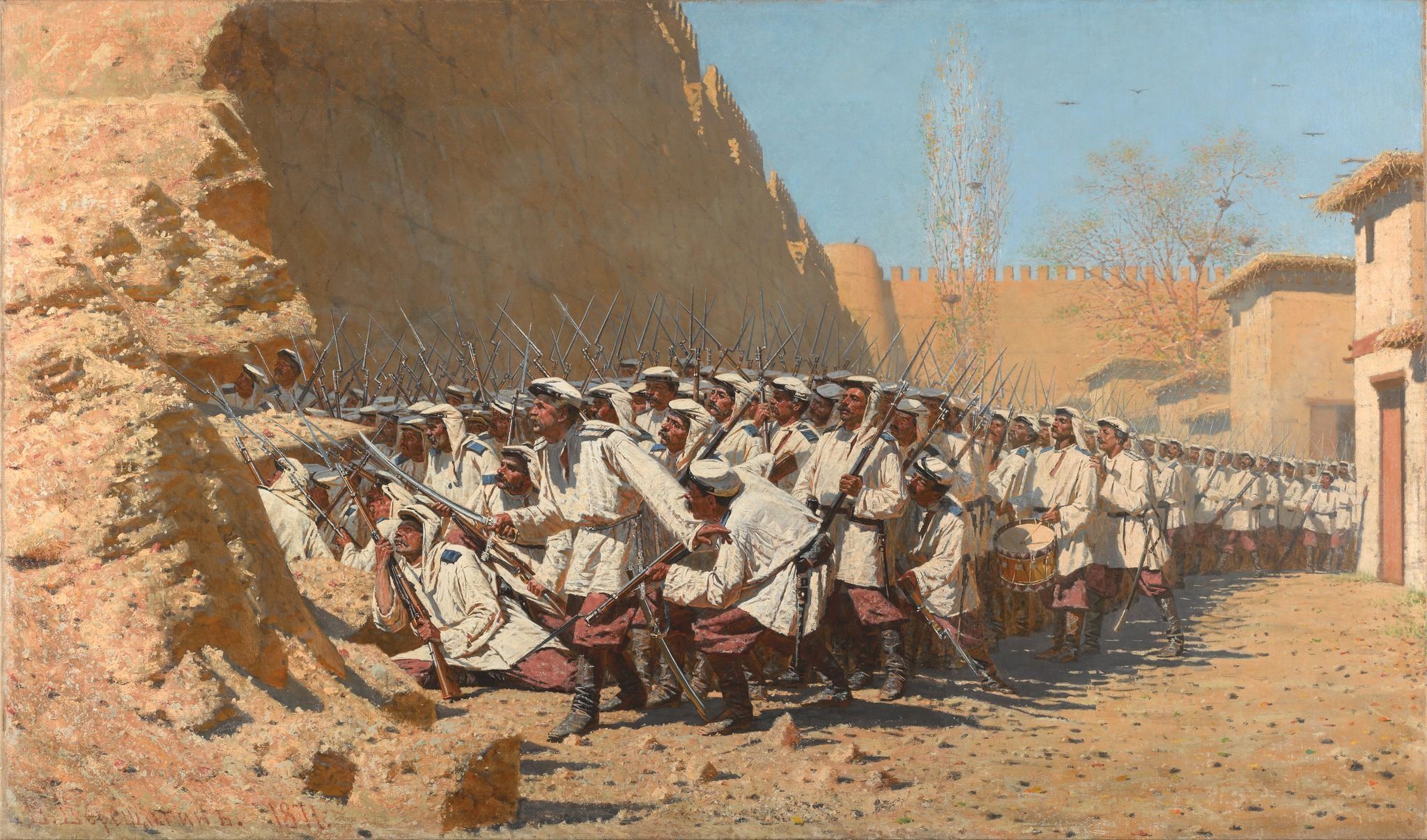
By the Fortress Wall. "Let Them Enter" (1871)

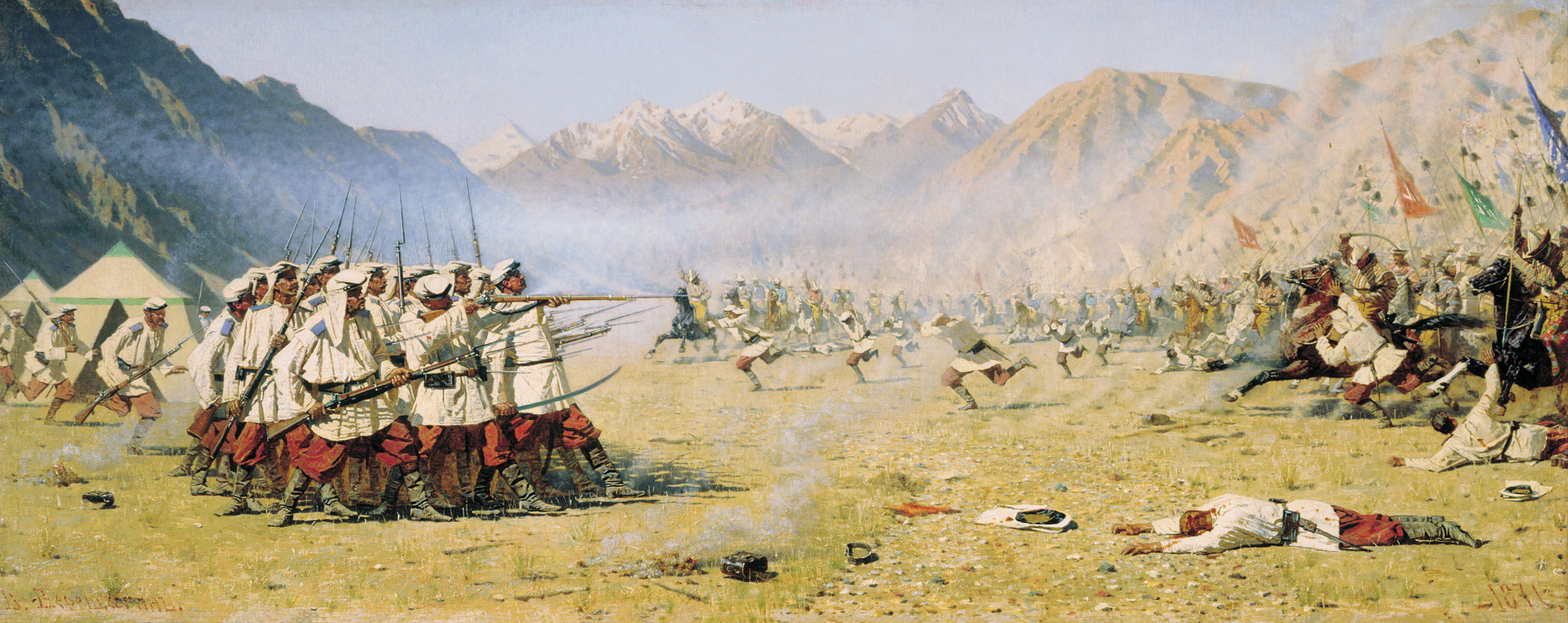
A Surprise Attack (1871)

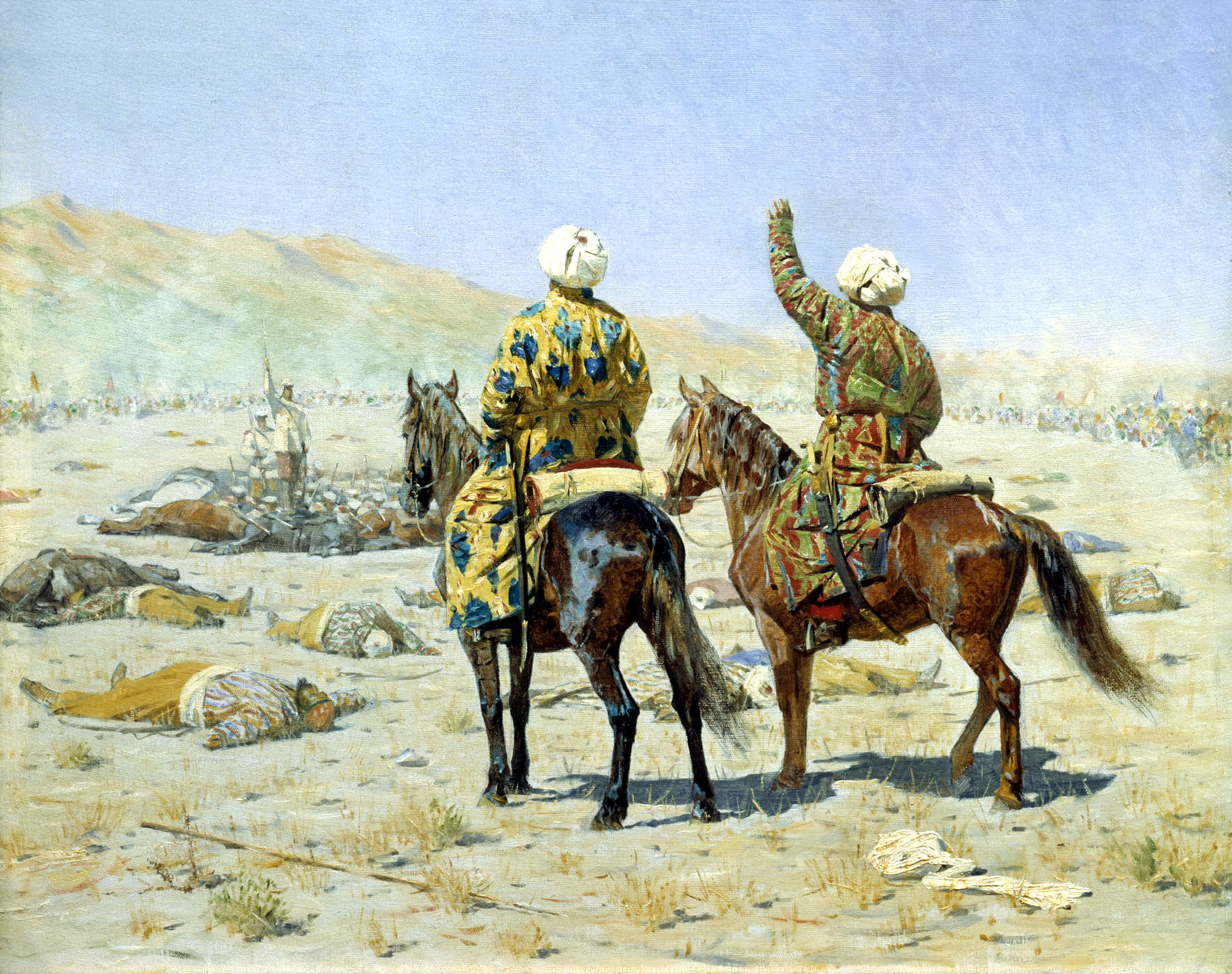
Parlimentaires. "Surrender!" — "Get the hell out!"

== Russo-Turkish War ==
With the start of the Second Russo-Turkish War, Vereshchagin left Paris and returned to active service with the Imperial Russian Army. He was present at the crossing of the Shipka Pass and at the siege of Plevna (1877), where his brother was killed. He was dangerously wounded during the preparations for the crossing of the Danube near Rustchuk. At the conclusion of the war, he acted as secretary to General Skobelev at San Stefano.

== World fame ==
After the war, Vereshchagin settled in Munich, where he produced his war pictures so rapidly that he was freely accused of employing assistants. The sensational subjects of his pictures, and their didactic aim, namely, the promotion of peace by a representation of the horrors of war, attracted a large section of the public not usually interested in art to the series of exhibitions of his pictures in Paris in 1881, and subsequently in London, Berlin, Dresden, Vienna, and other cities.

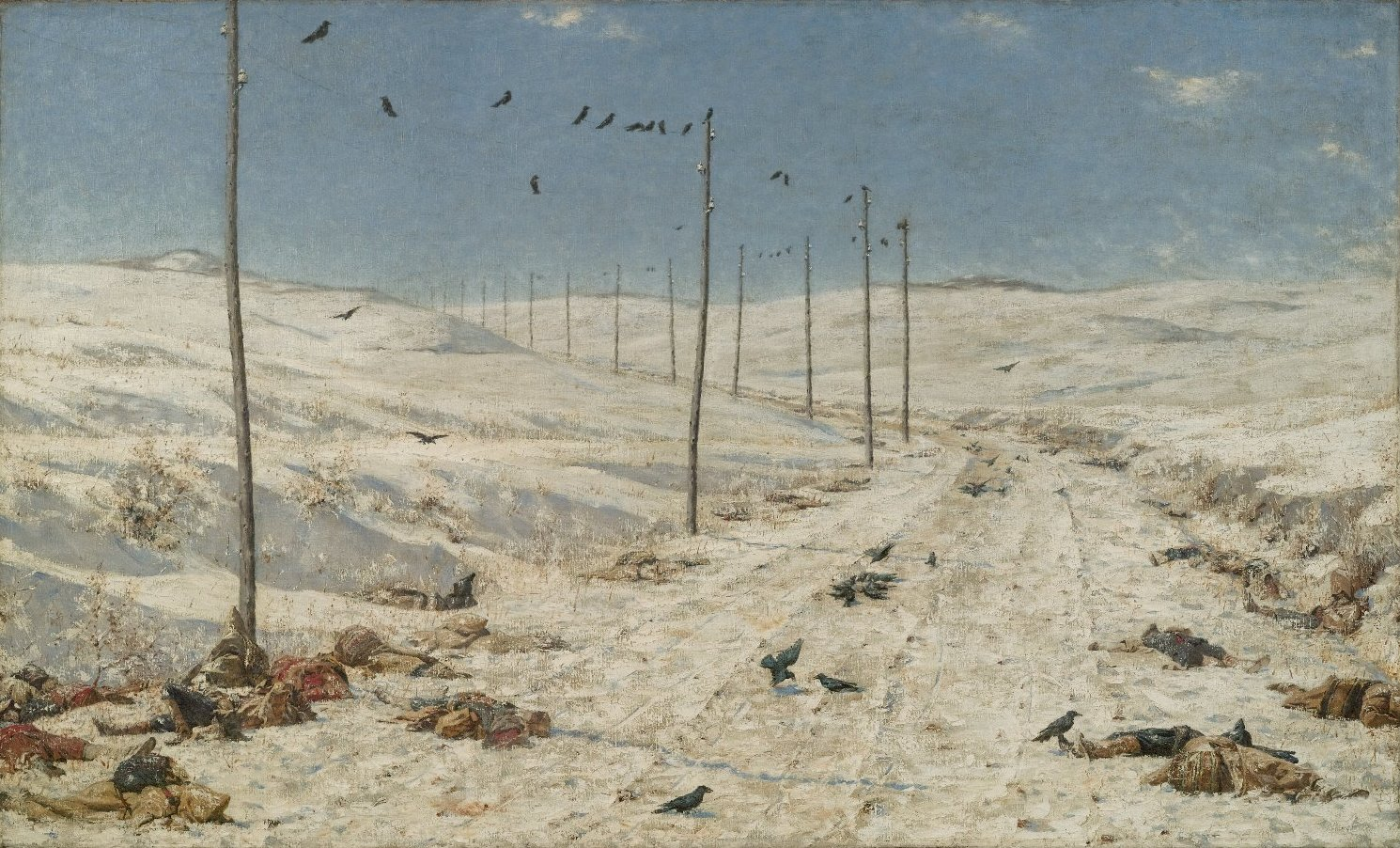
The Road of the War Prisoners (1878–1879). Brooklyn Museum

Vereshchagin painted several scenes of imperial rule in British India. His epic portrayal of The State Procession of the Prince of Wales into Jaipur in 1876 is at 196 in × 274 in believed to be the second-largest oil painting in the world. He traveled again to India in 1882–1883.

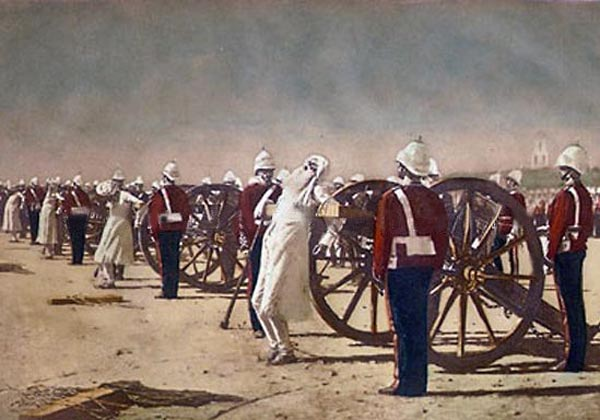
Blowing from Guns in British India (1884)

He aroused much controversy by his series of three pictures: firstly, of a Roman execution (the Crucifixion by the Romans (1887)); secondly, Suppression of the Indian Revolt by the English; and, thirdly, of the execution of Nihilists in St Petersburg. When Suppression of the Indian Revolt by the English was first exhibited, many in America and Britain believed that it depicted executions of sepoys carried out by tying victims to the barrels of guns. Vereshchagin's detractors argued that such executions had only occurred in the Indian Rebellion of 1857, but the painting depicted modern soldiers of the 1880s, implying that the practice was then current. Because of its photographic style, the painting appeared to present itself as an impartial record of a real event. In fact, Vereshchagin's work did show a more contemporary though lesser known execution; in 1872 Deputy-Commissioner J. L. Cowan ordered the execution of a group of Namdhari Sikhs at the parade grounds in Malerkotla by blowing from guns. In 1887, Vereshchagin defended himself in The Magazine of Art by saying that if there were another rebellion then the British would use this method again.

A journey to the Ottoman provinces of Syria and Palestine in 1884 furnished him with an equally discussed set of subjects from the New Testament. Vereshchagin's paintings caused controversy over his portrayal of the figure of Christ with what was thought at the time to be an unseemly realism. The 1812 series on Napoleon's Russian campaign, on which Vereshchagin also wrote a book, seems to have been inspired by Tolstoi's War and Peace, and was painted in 1893 in Moscow, where the artist eventually settled.

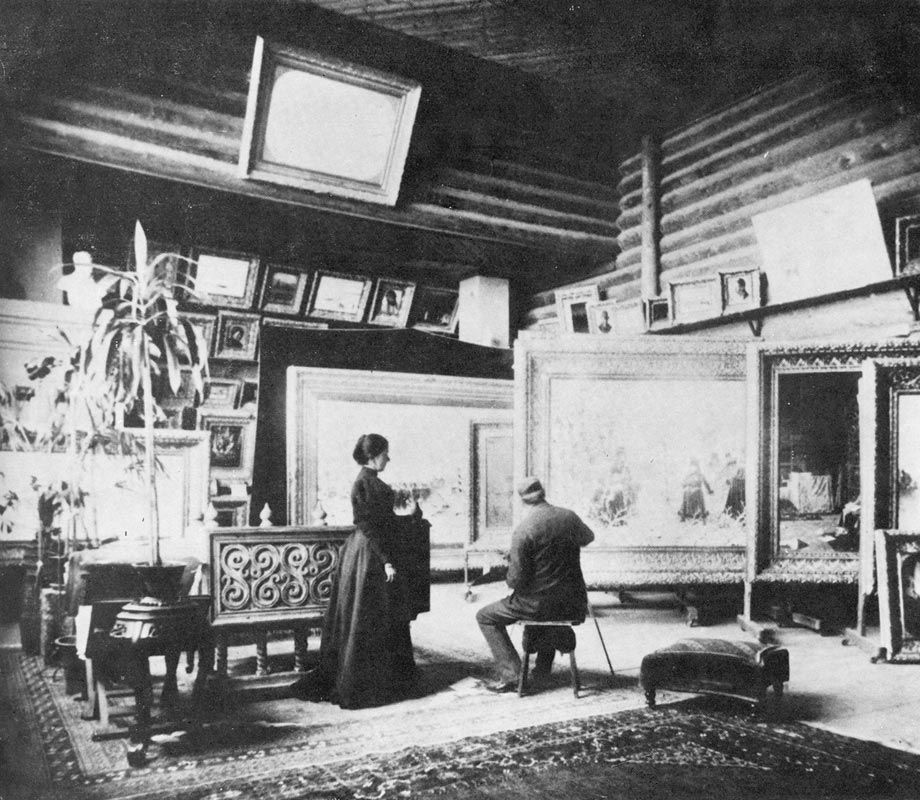
Vereshchagin in his atelier; 1890s

== Last years ==
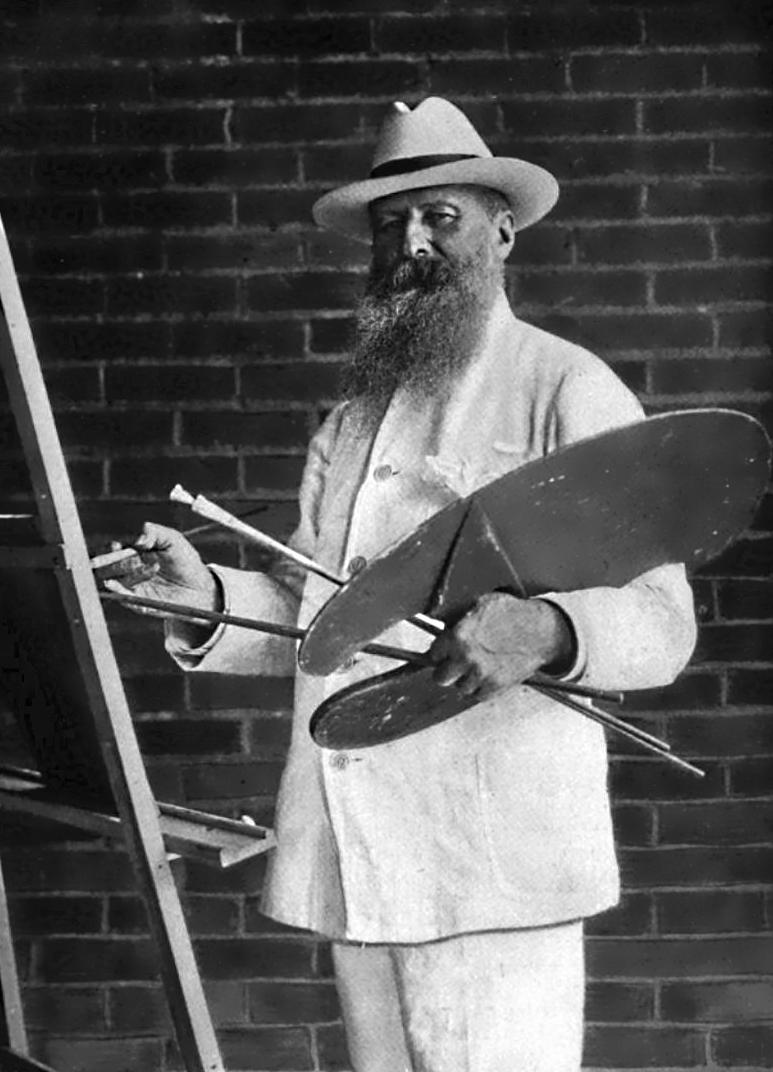
Vasily Vereshchagin in 1902

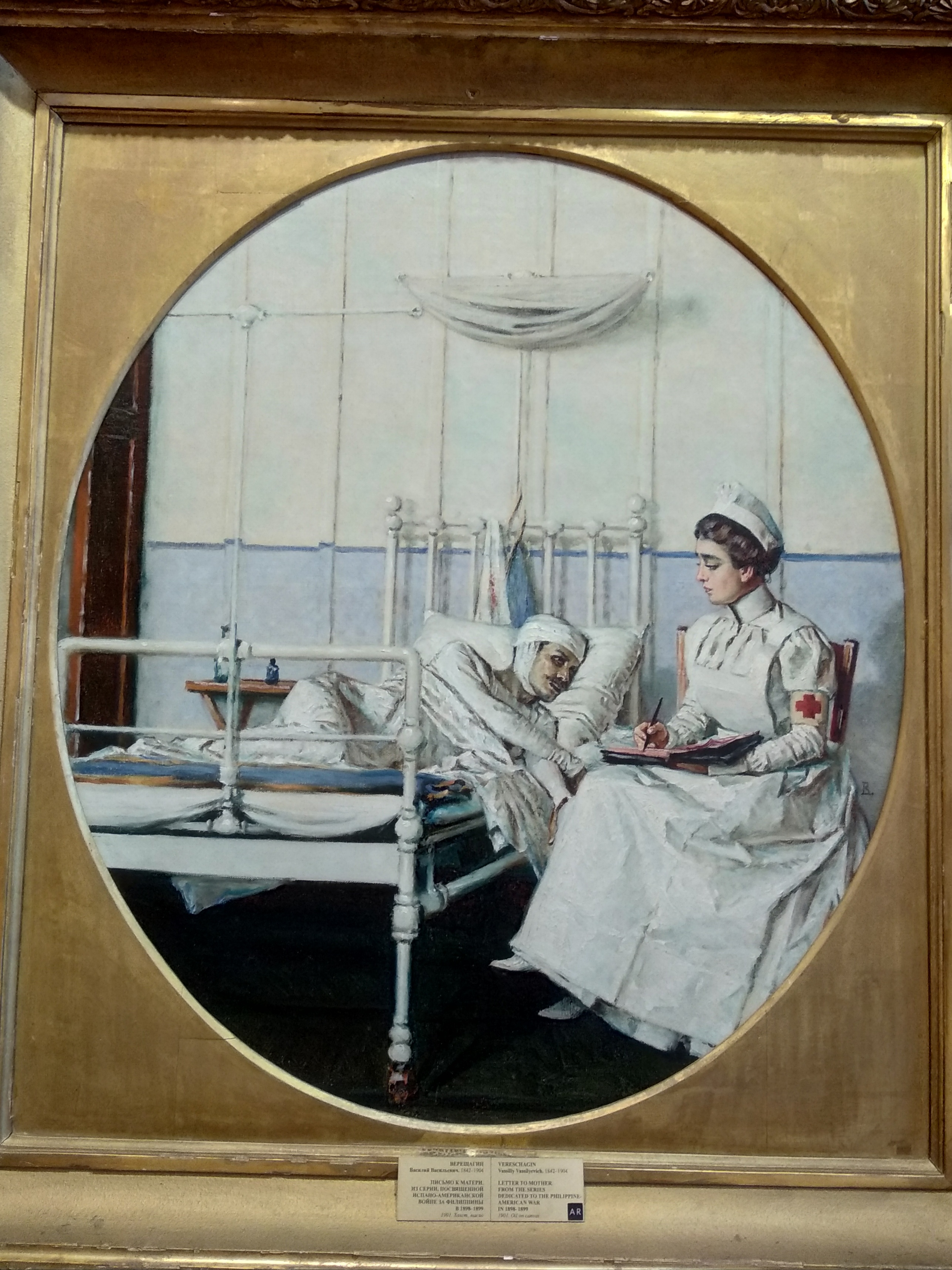
Letter to mother (1901) from the series dedicated to the Philippine–American War in 1898–1899

Vereshchagin was in the Far East during the First Sino-Japanese War of 1894–1895, and was with the Russian troops in Manchuria during the Boxer Rebellion of 1900. In 1901, he visited the Philippines, in 1902 the United States and Cuba, and in 1903, Japan.

During the Russo-Japanese War, he was invited by Admiral Stepan Makarov to join him aboard Makarov's battleship, Petropavlovsk. On 13 April 1904, Petropavlovsk struck two mines while returning to Port Arthur and sank, taking with it most of the crew, including both Admiral Makarov and Vereshchagin. Vereshchagin's last work, a picture of a council of war presided over by Admiral Makarov, was recovered almost undamaged.

== Legacy ==
- The town of Vereshchagino in Perm Krai is named after him, as well as a minor planet, 3410 Vereshchagin, discovered by Soviet astronomer Lyudmila Zhuravlyova in 1978.
- Vereshchagin Street in Cherepovets is named after Vasily Vereshchagin, also there are a historic house museum and a monument to Vereshchagin in Cherepovets.
- He is a distant relative of the Czech rock singer Aleš Brichta. The Apotheosis of War was used by Czech heavy metal band Arakain as the cover art for the album Farao.

== Gallery ==
Napoleon. 1812

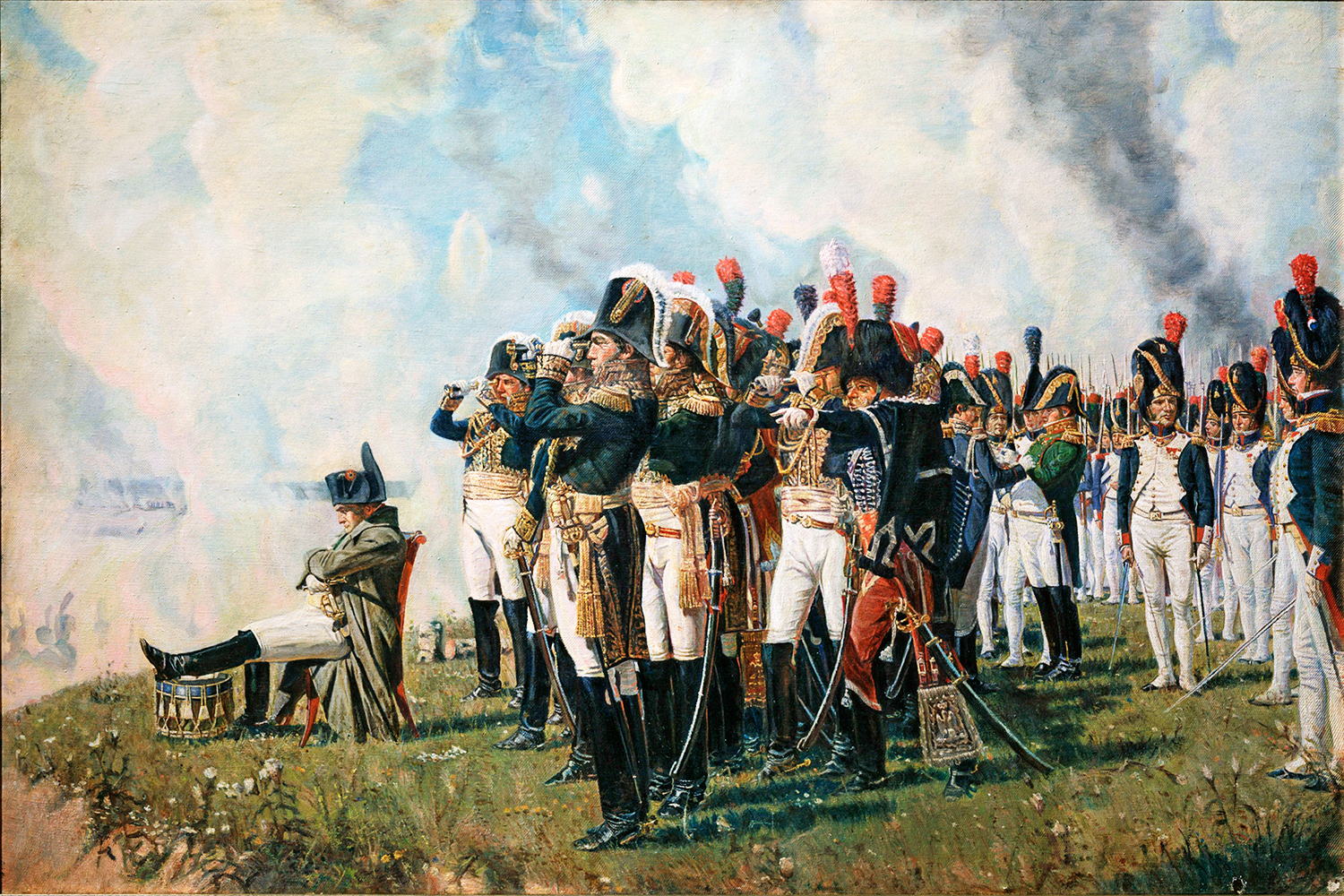
Napoleon near Borodino

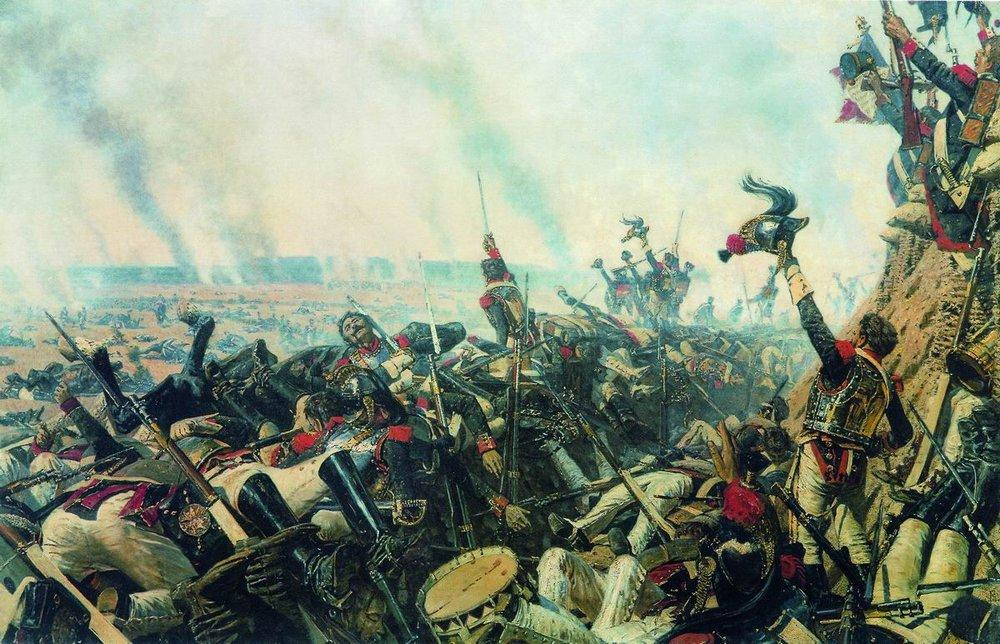
The end of Borodino battle

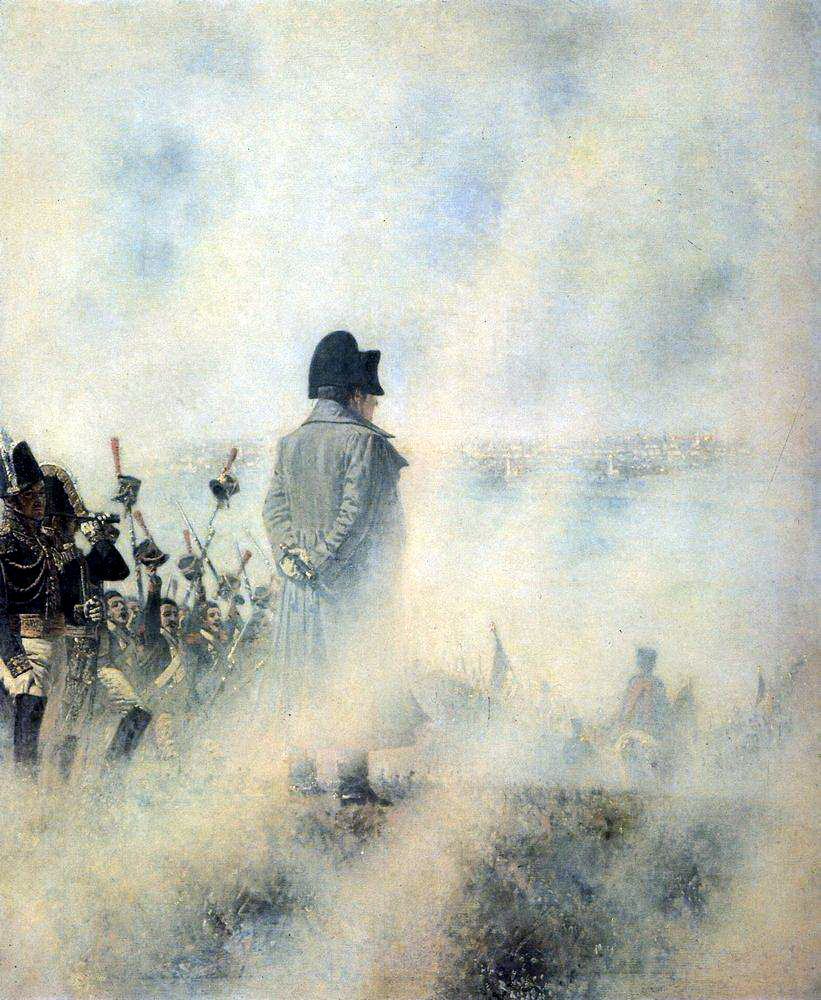
Before Moscow waiting for the Boyars' Deputation

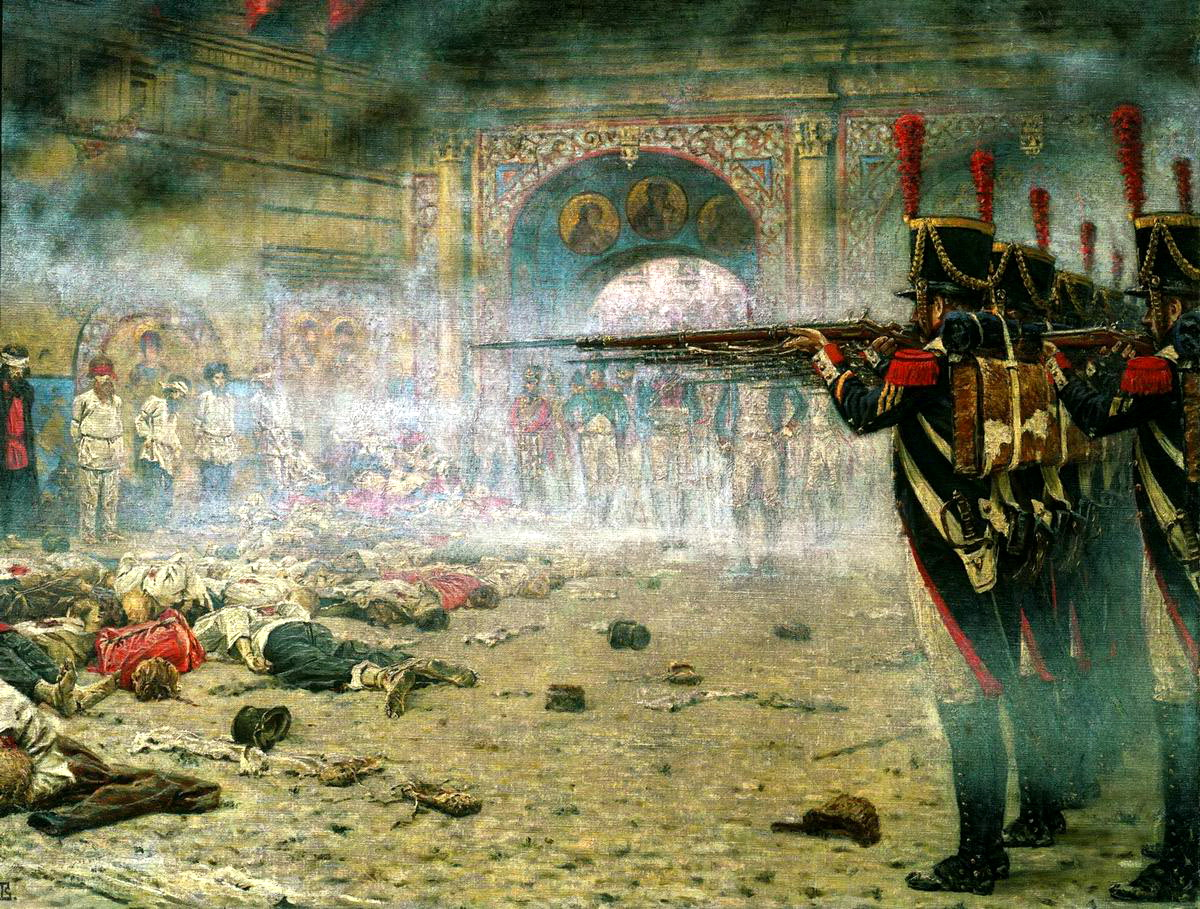
In Defeated Moscow

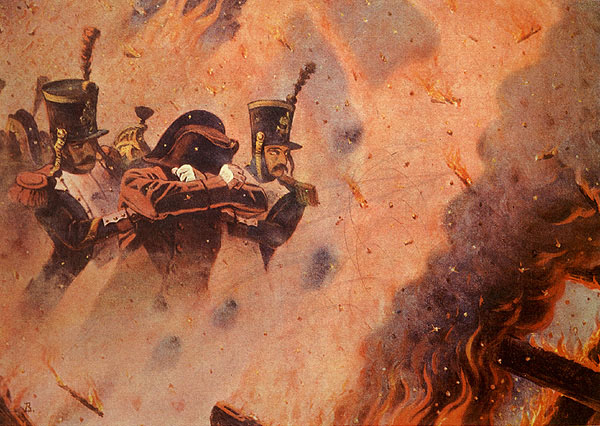
Through the fire

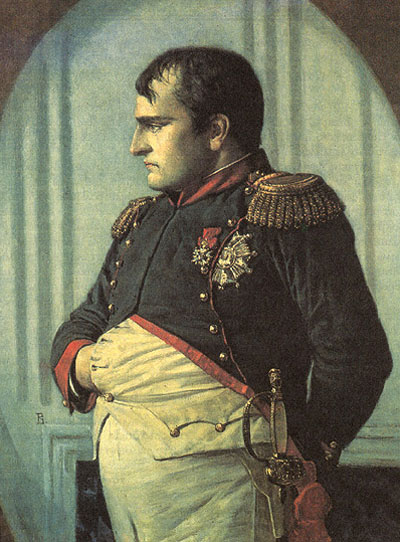
In Petrovsky Palace (Waiting for peace)

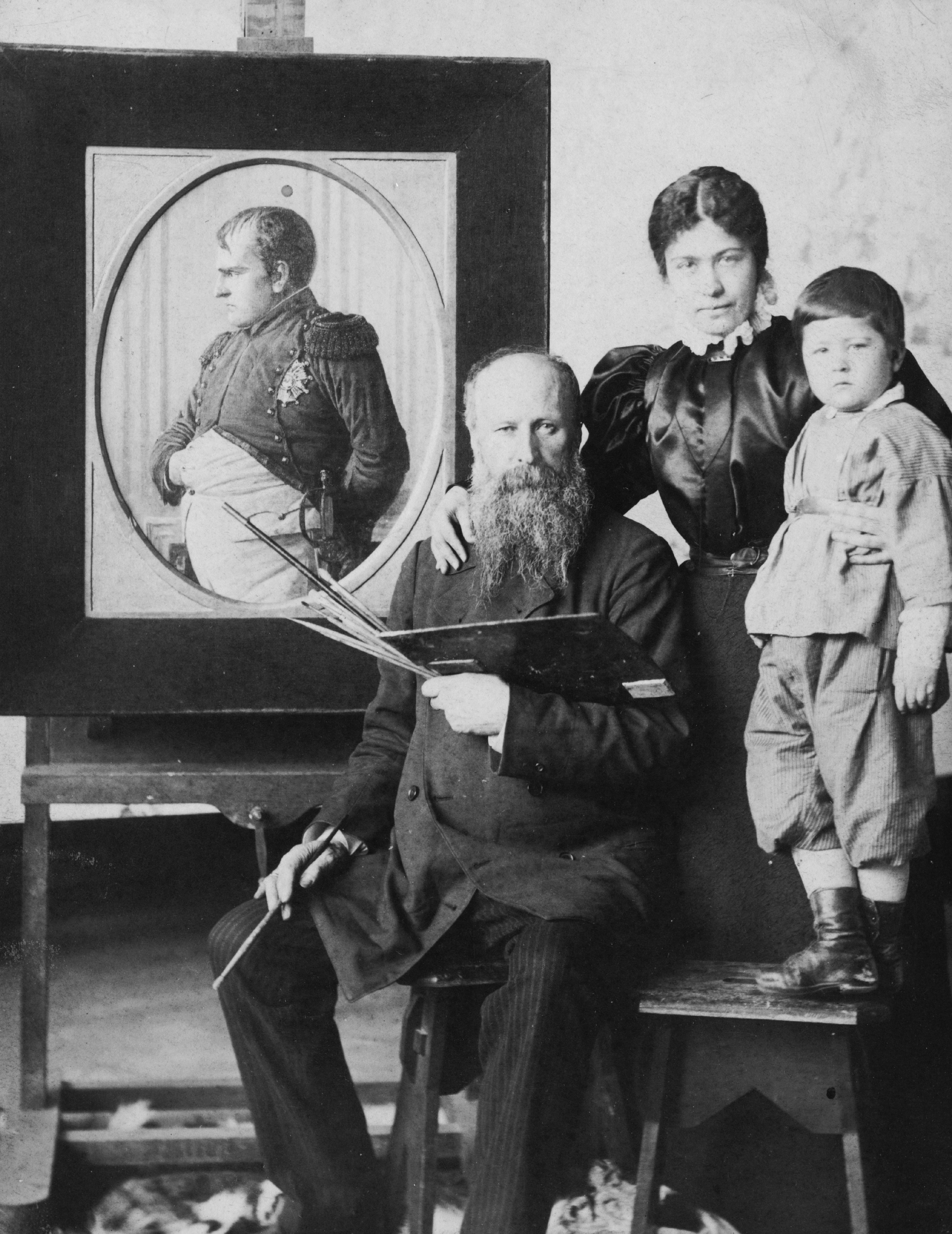
Vereshchagin with his wife Lydia and son Vasily at the In Petrovsky Palace painting. 1895–1896

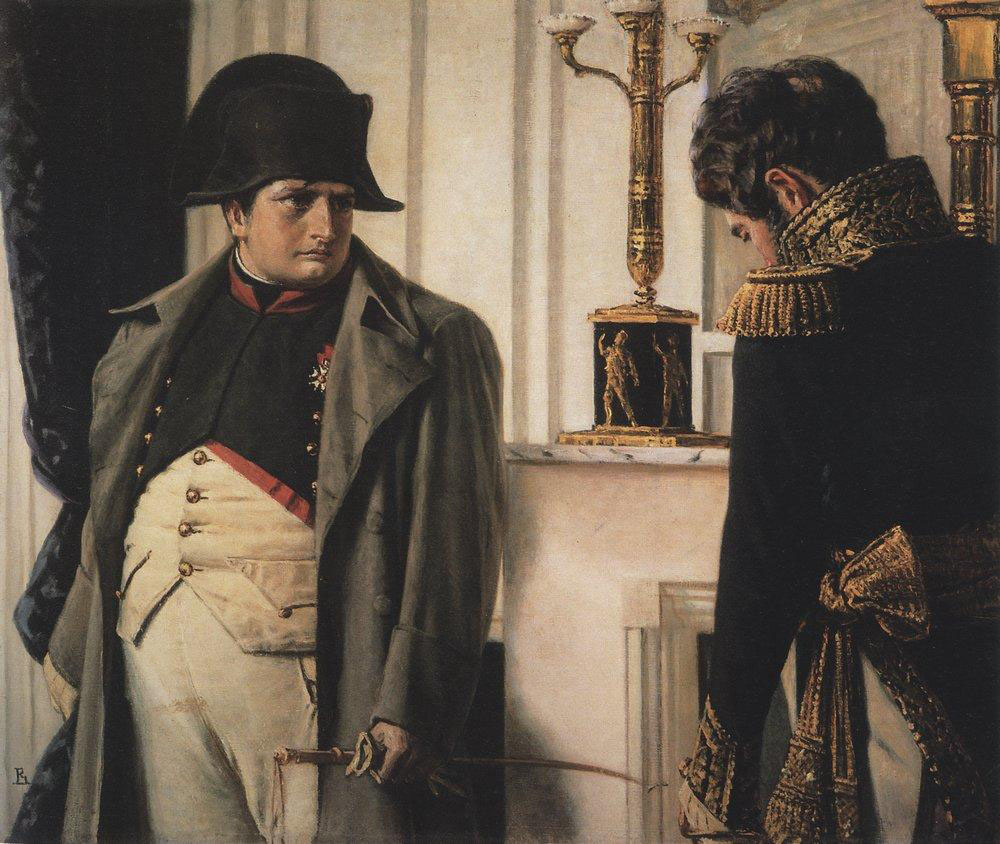
Napoleon and general Lauriston (Peace at all costs!)

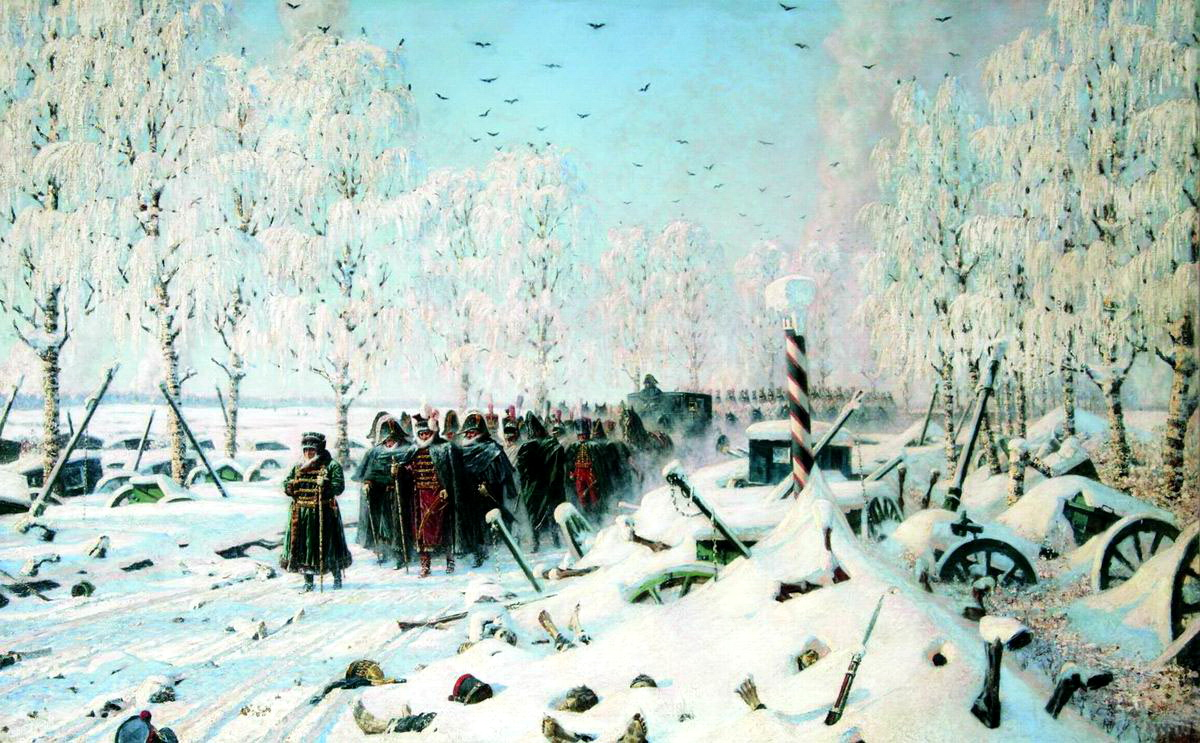
On the high road. Retreat, flight

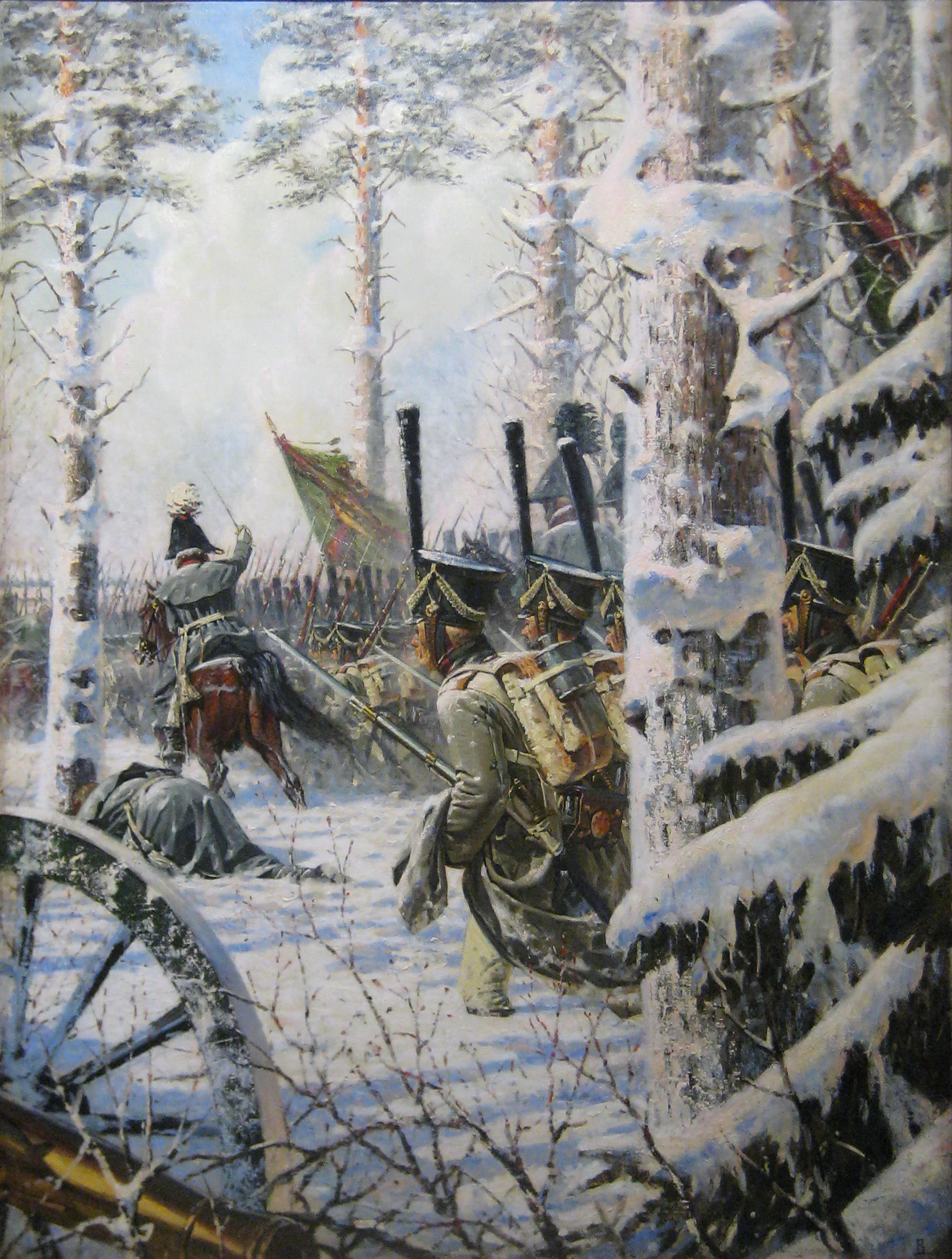
Fix Bayonets! Hooray! Hooray! (the Battle of Krasnoi)

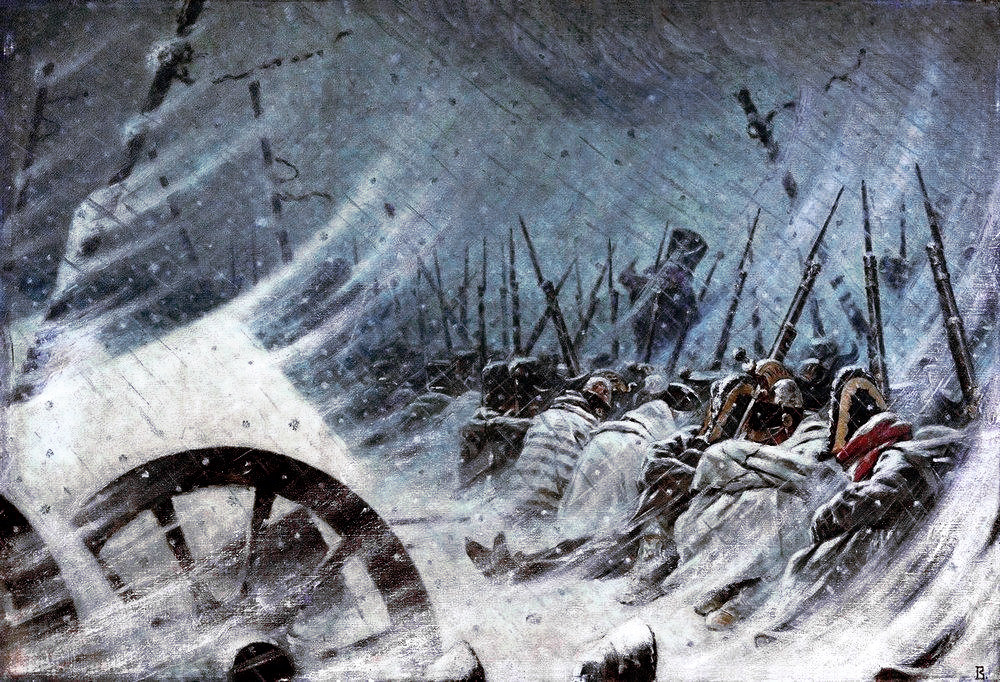
Night Bivouac of Great Army
Balkan series

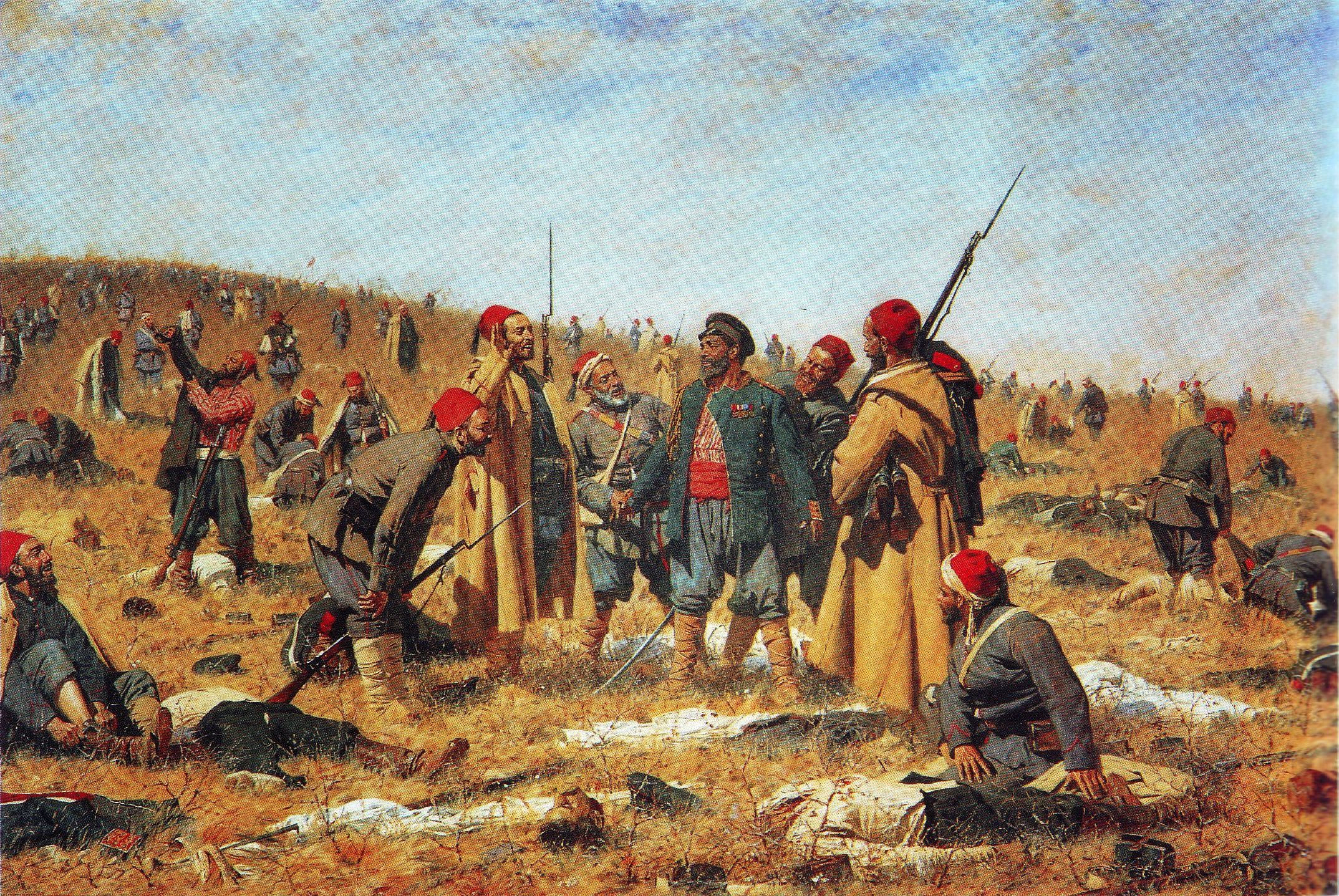
Victors

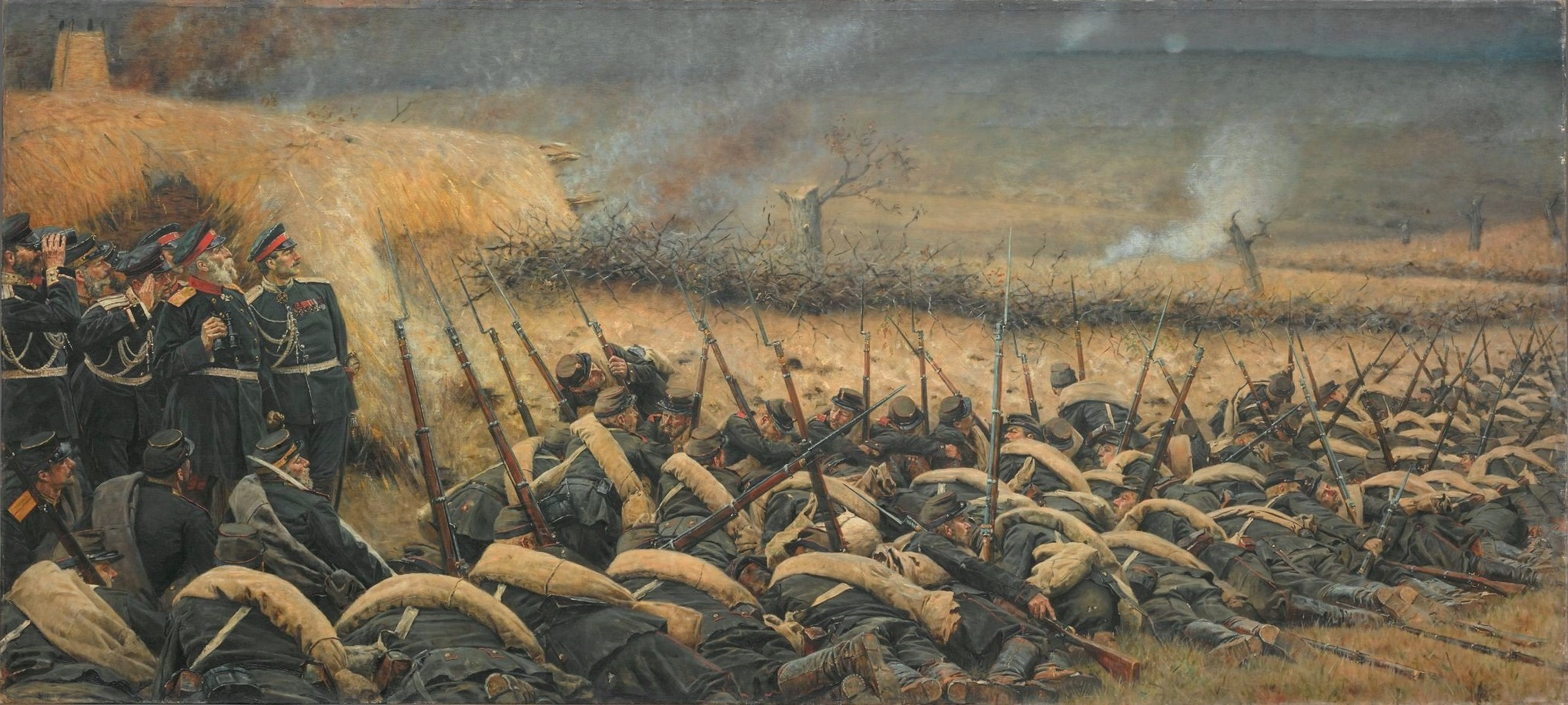
Before the attack. At Plevna

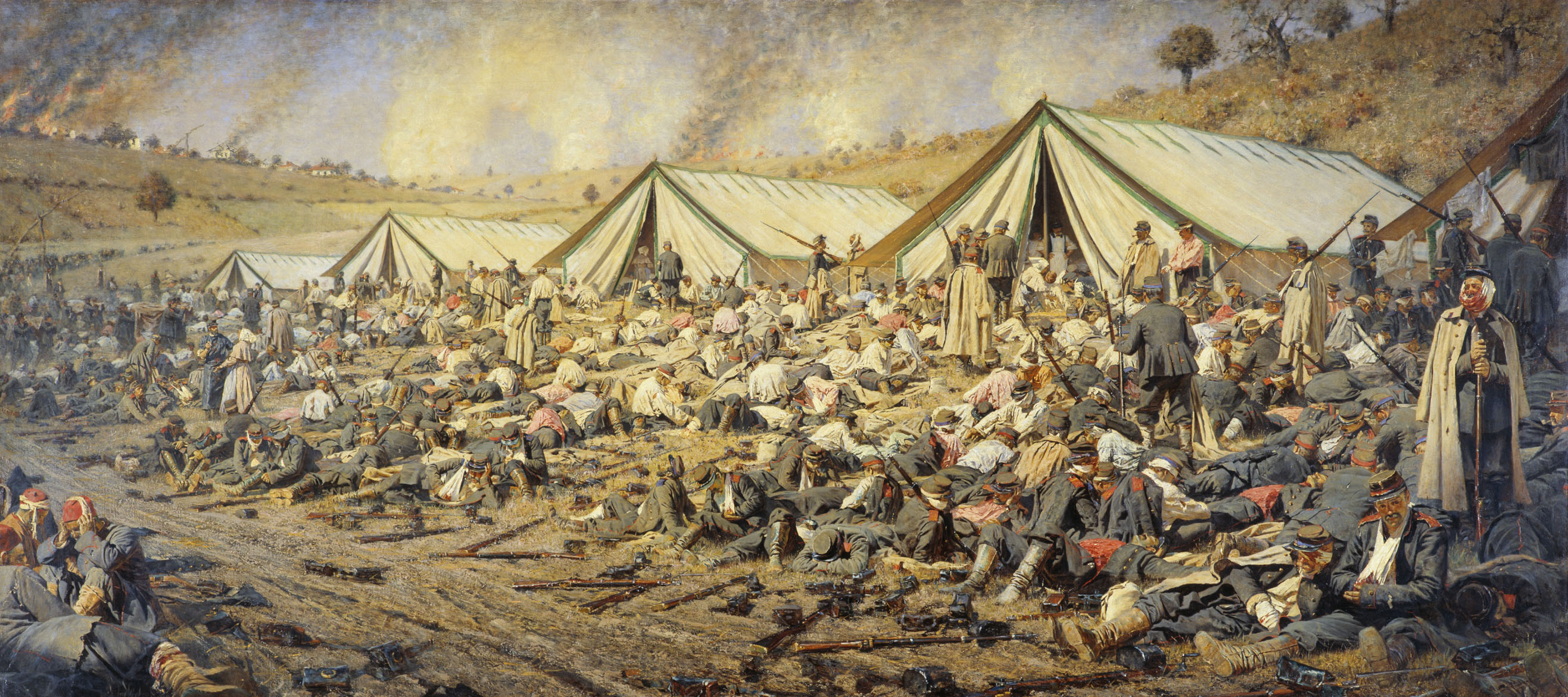
After the Attack

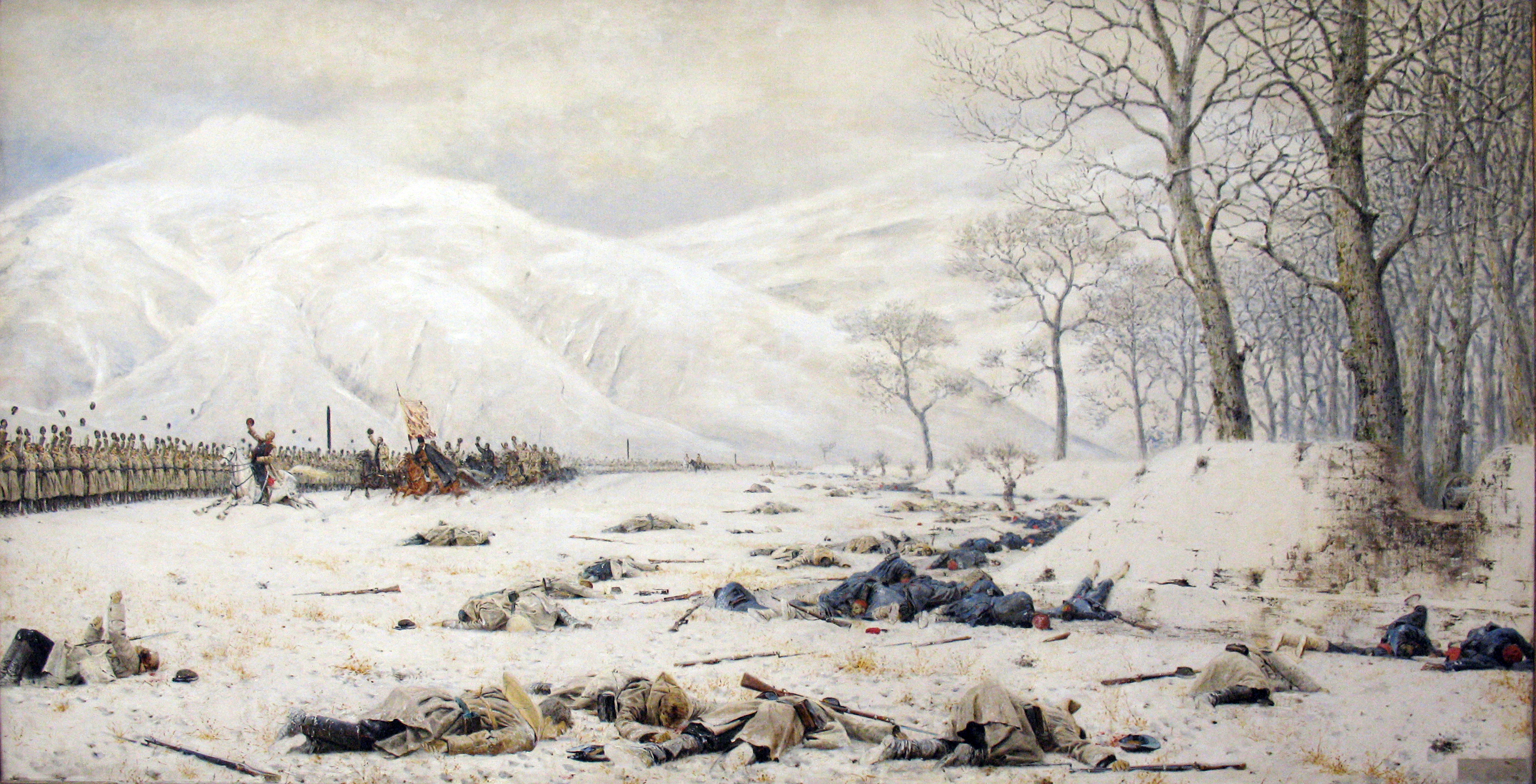
The battlefield at Shipka (Skobelev at Shipka)

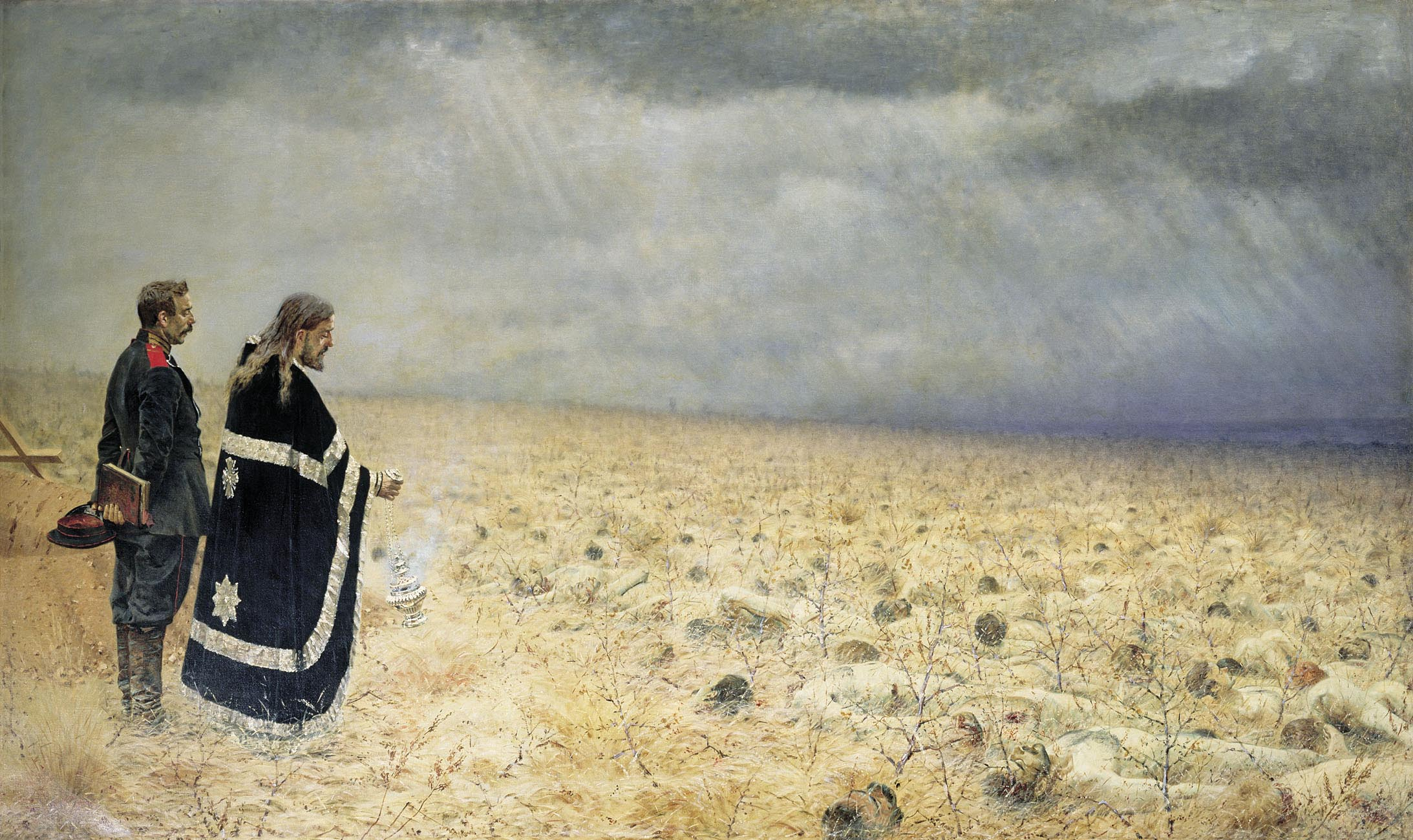
Defeated. Requiem

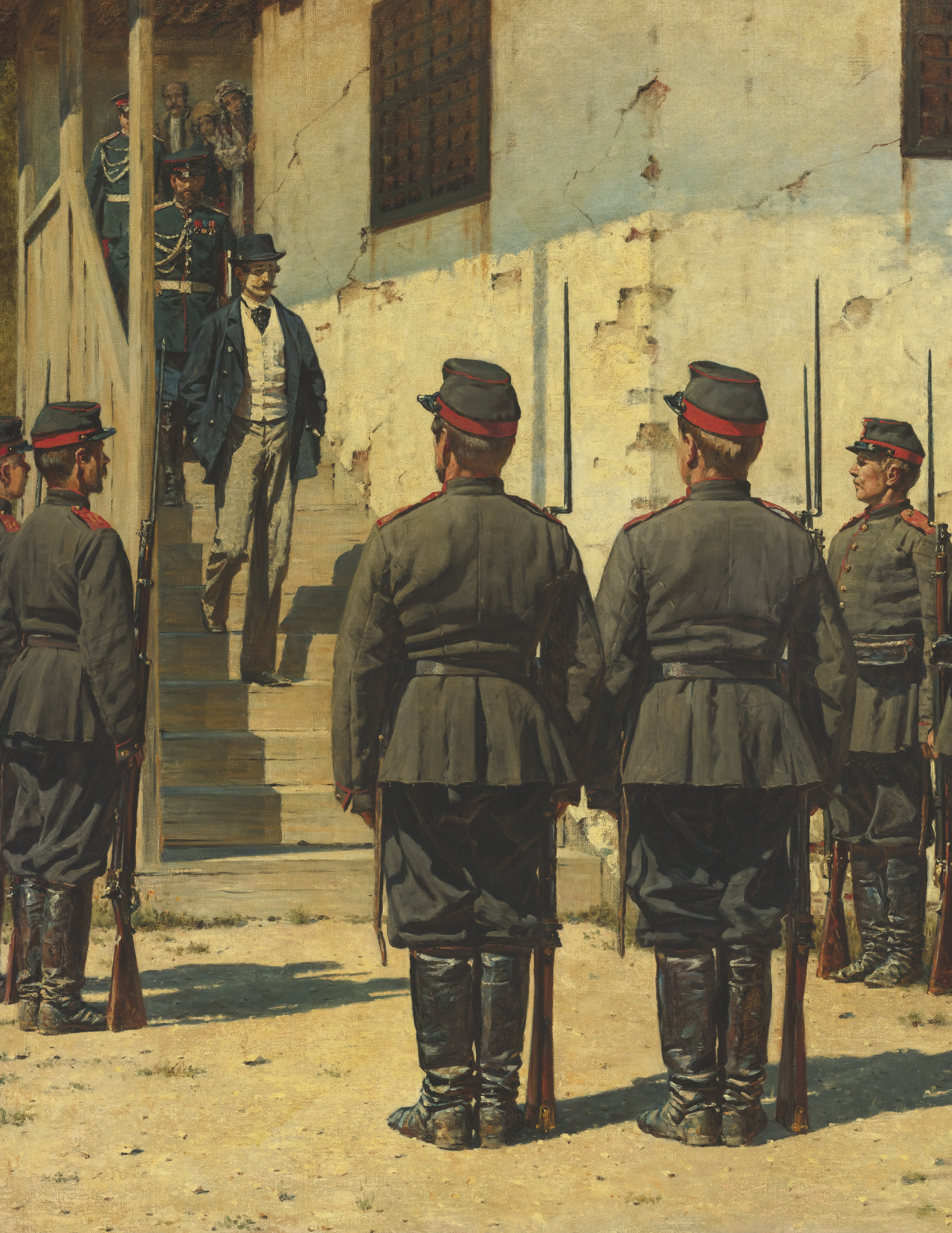
The Spy

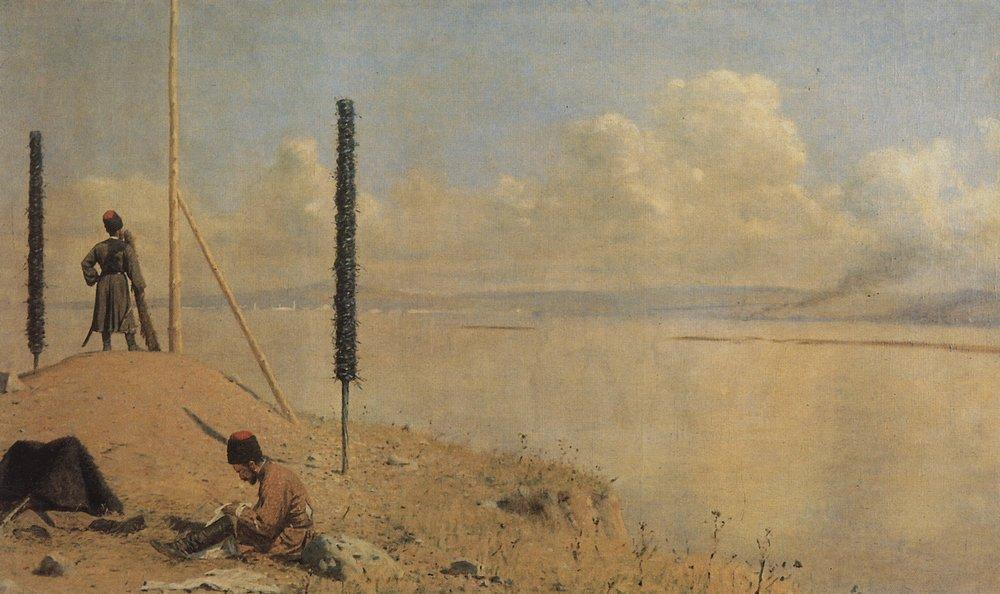
Picket on the Danube

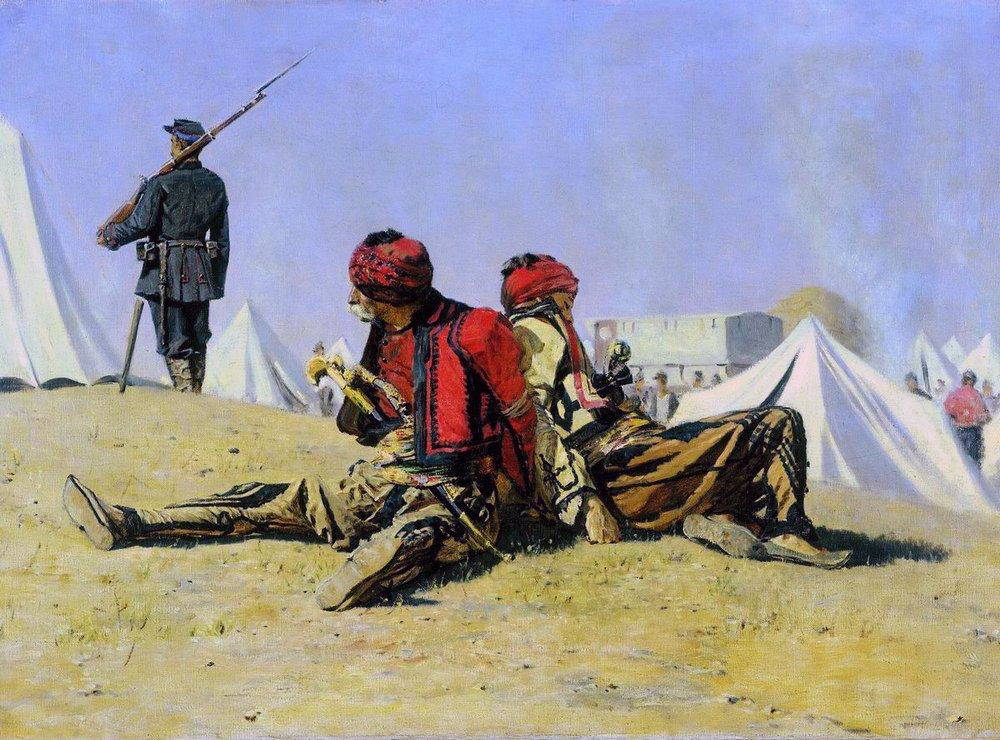
Two hawks (Bashi-bazouk)

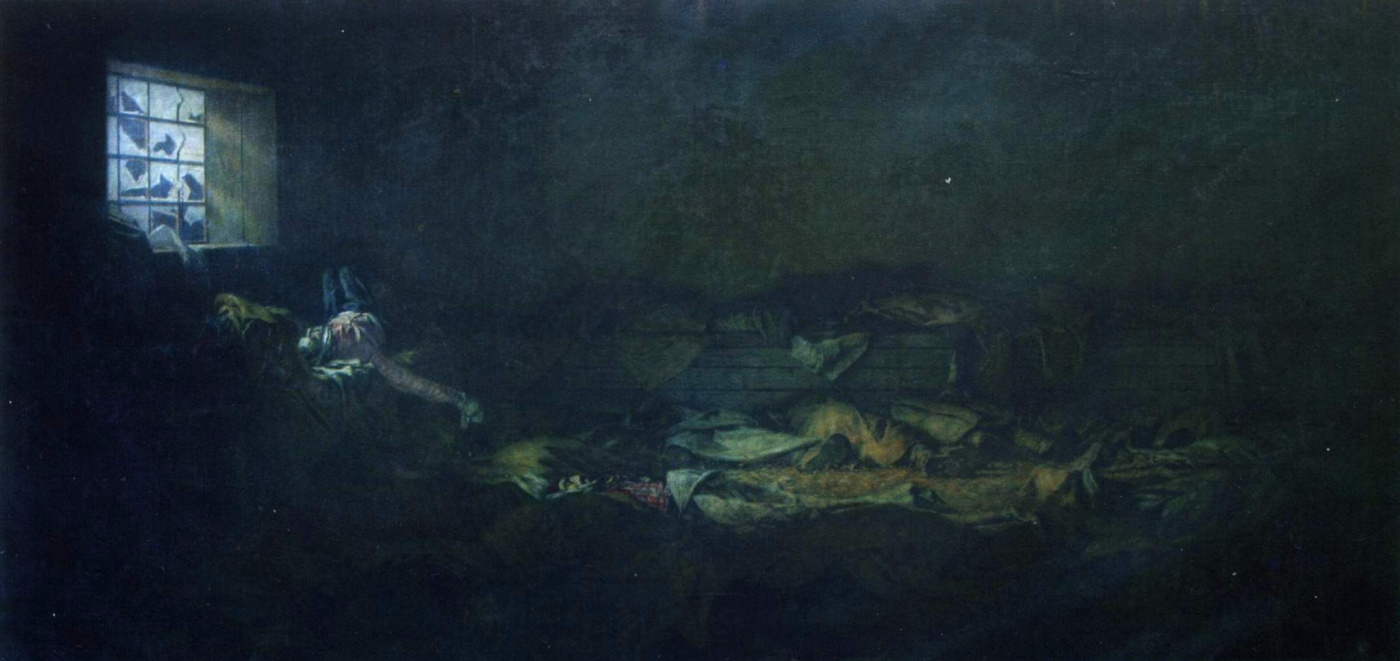
In a Turkish mortuary

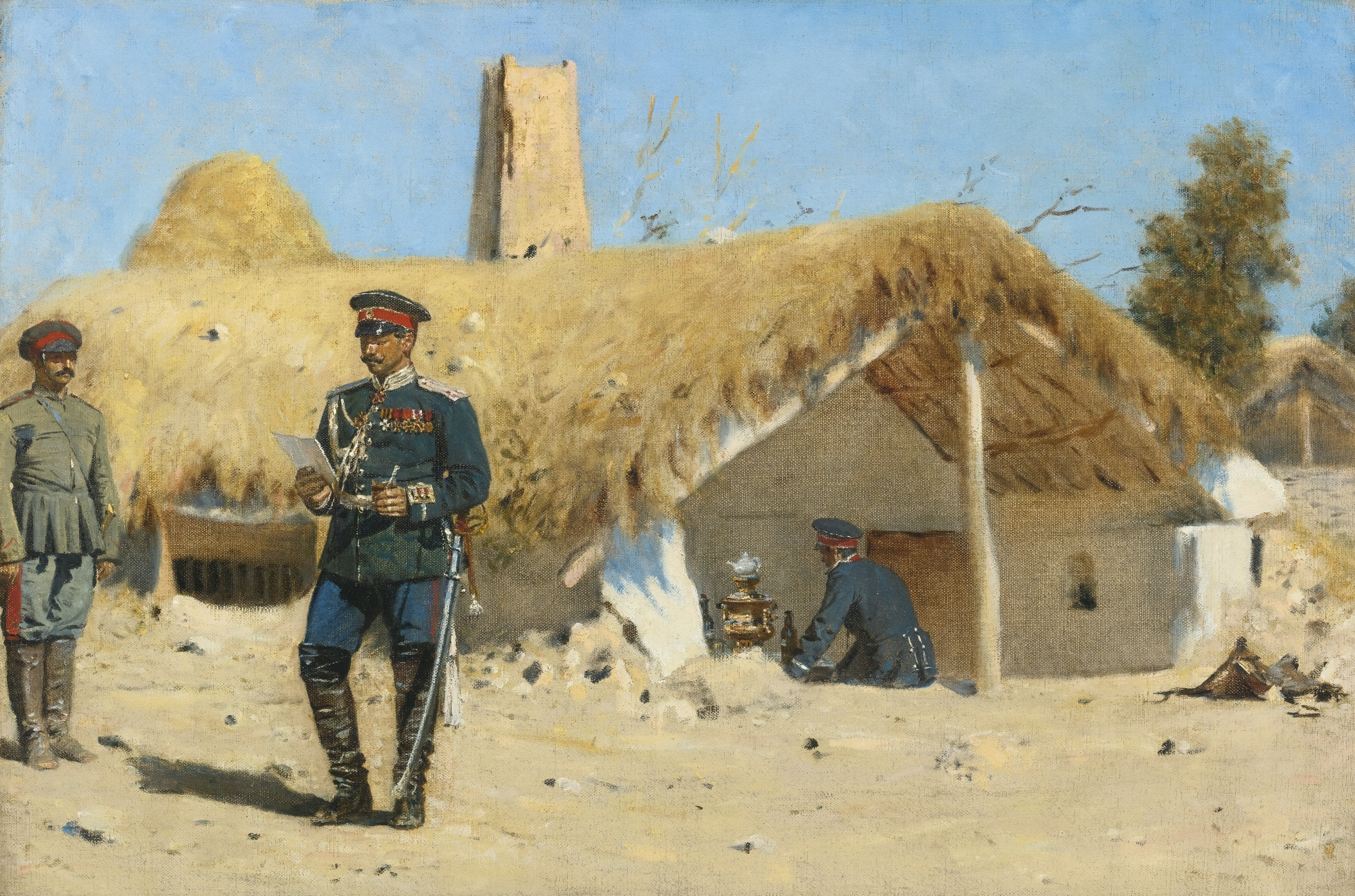
The Adjutant
Other works

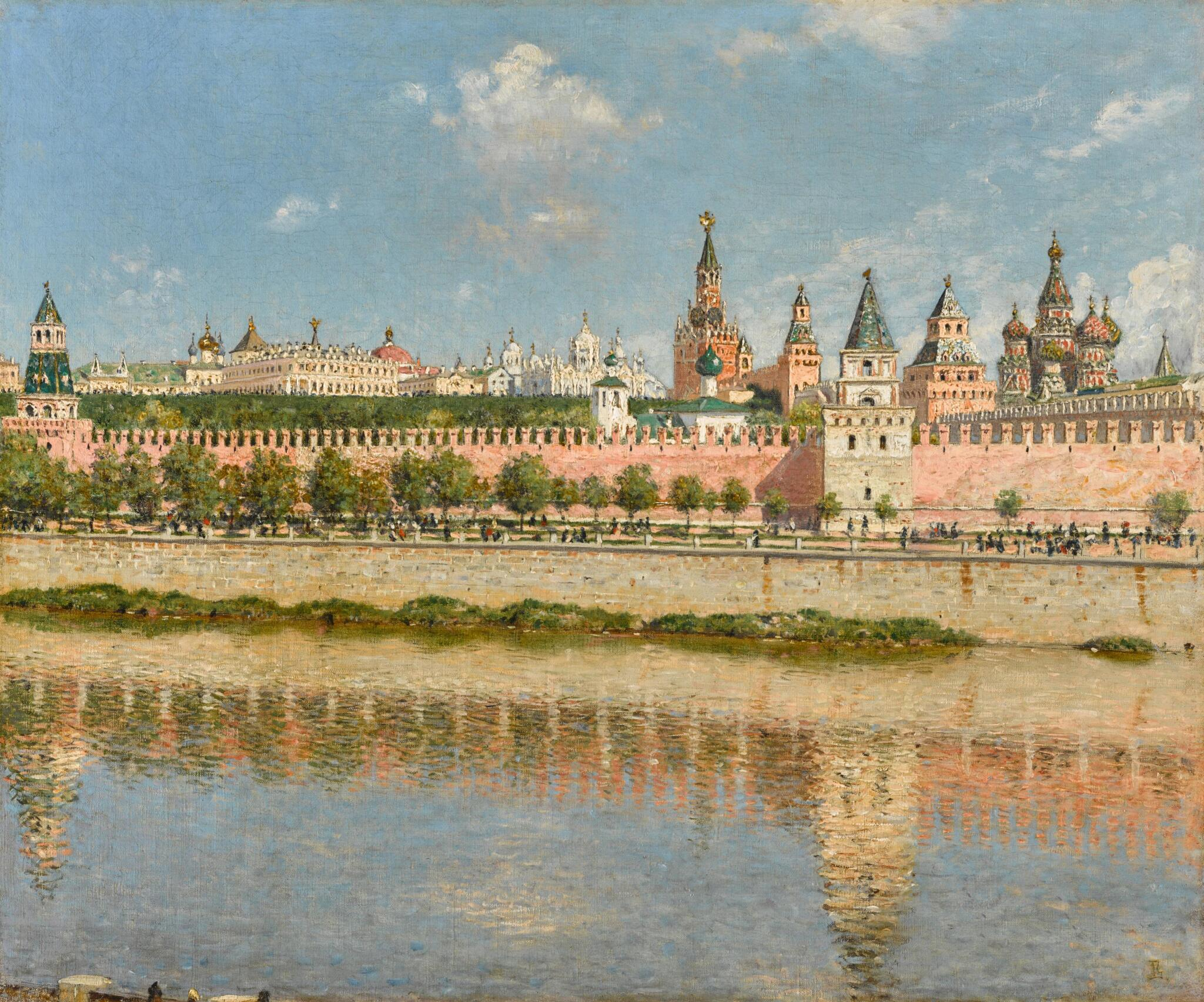
The Moscow Cathedrals and river Moskva (in the spring)

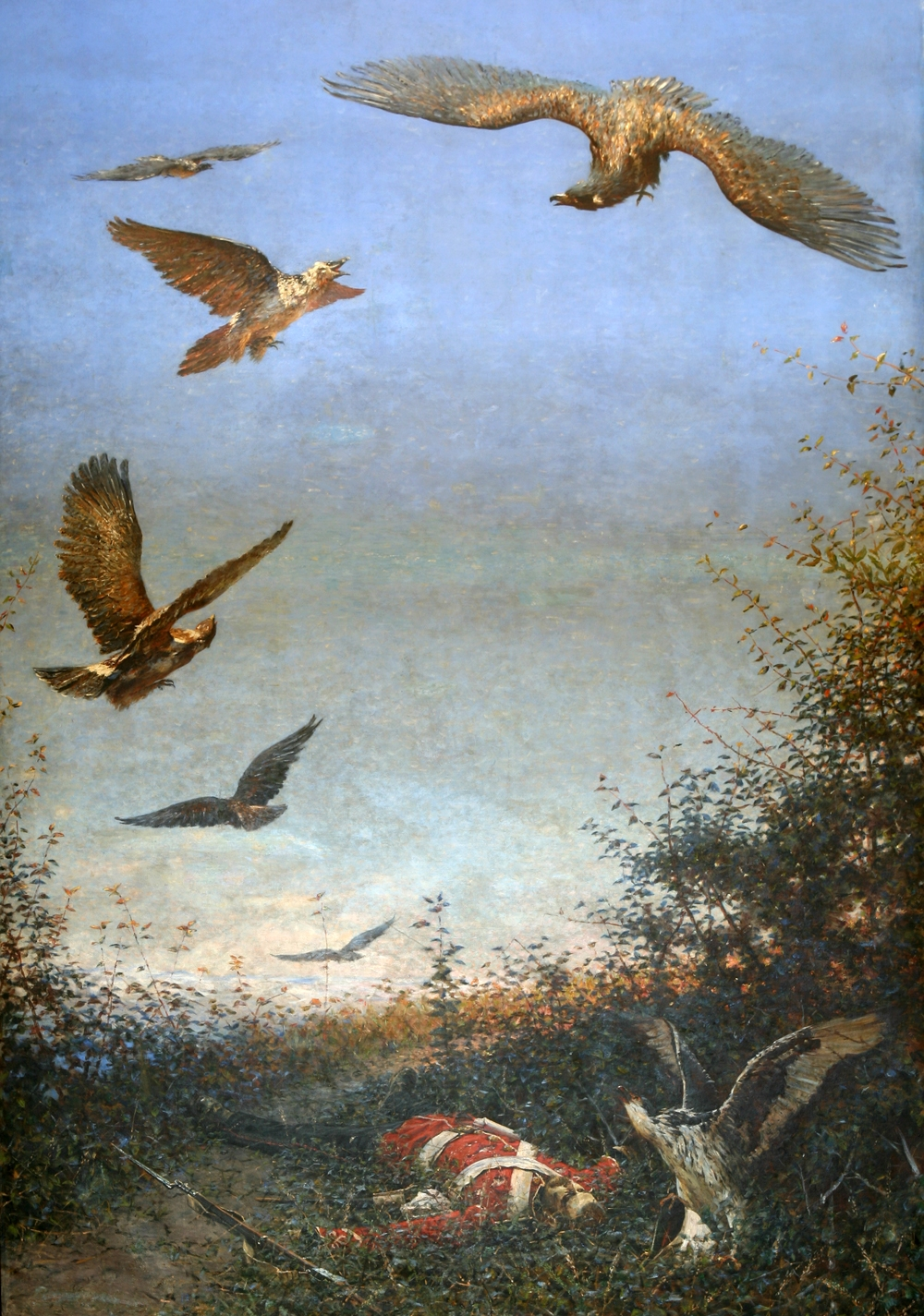
Eagles (A forgotten soldier)

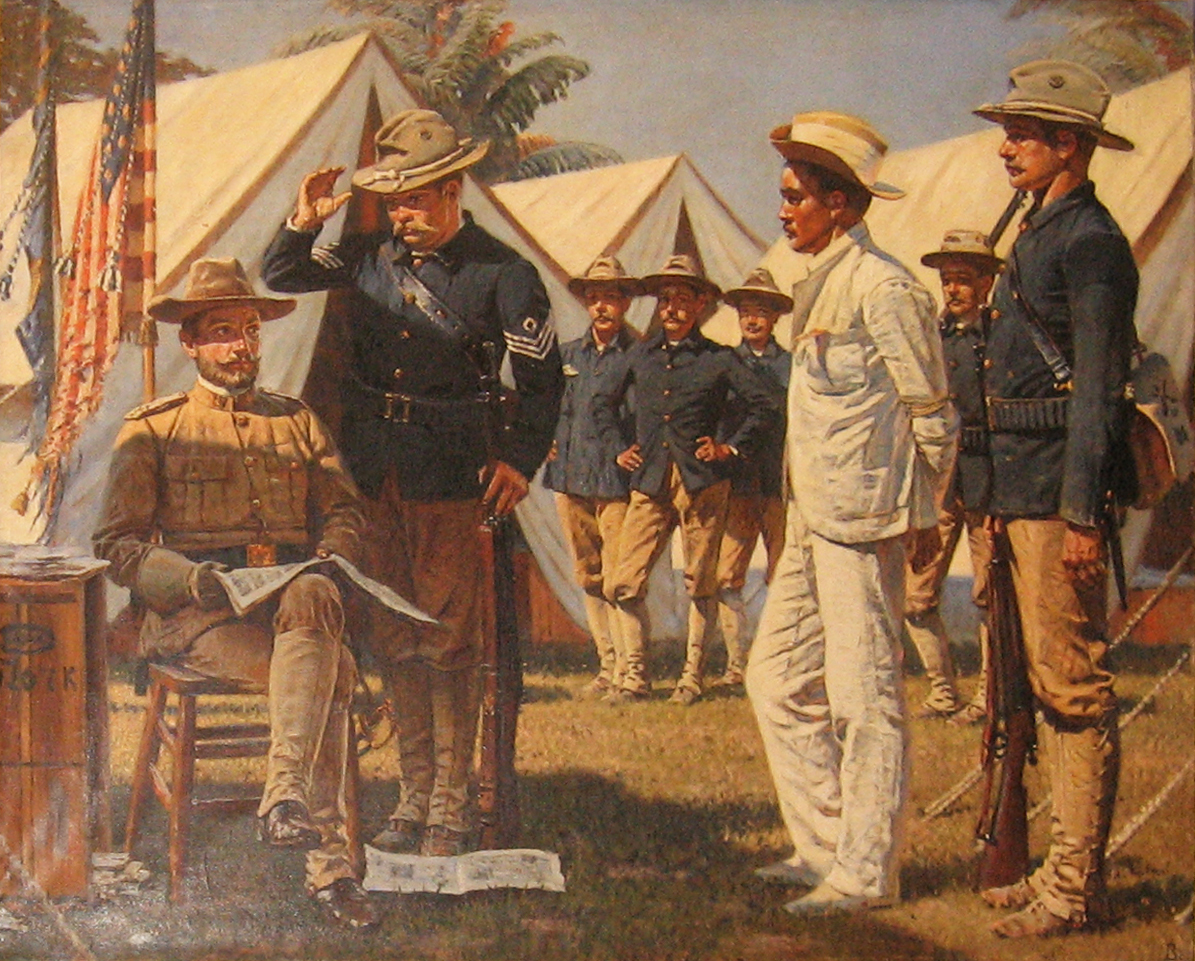
Spy (Spanish–American War)

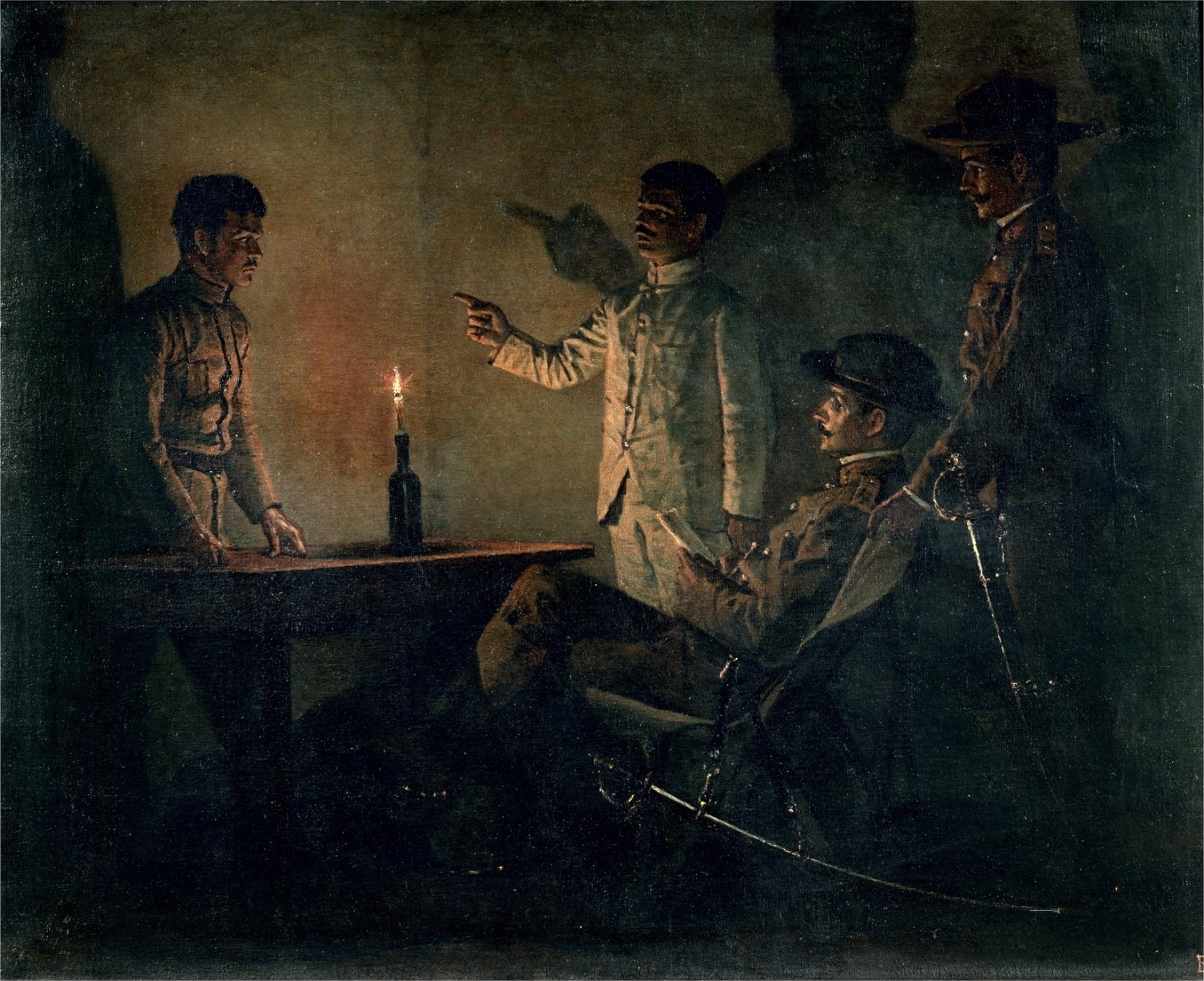
Interrogation of a deserter

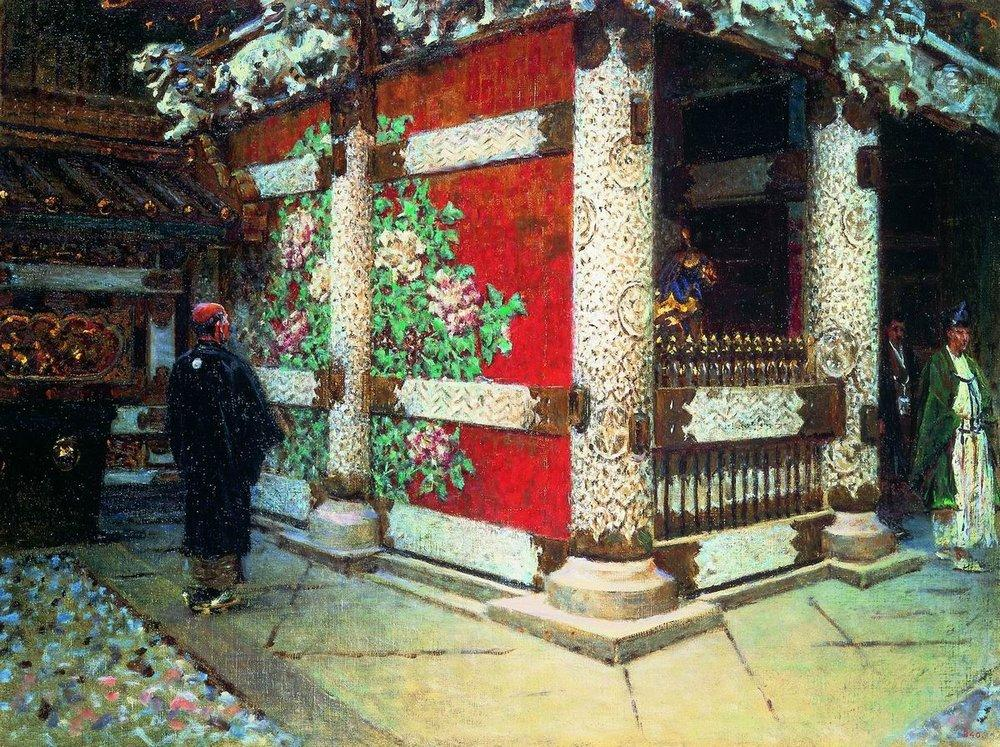
Shinto shrine in Nikkō

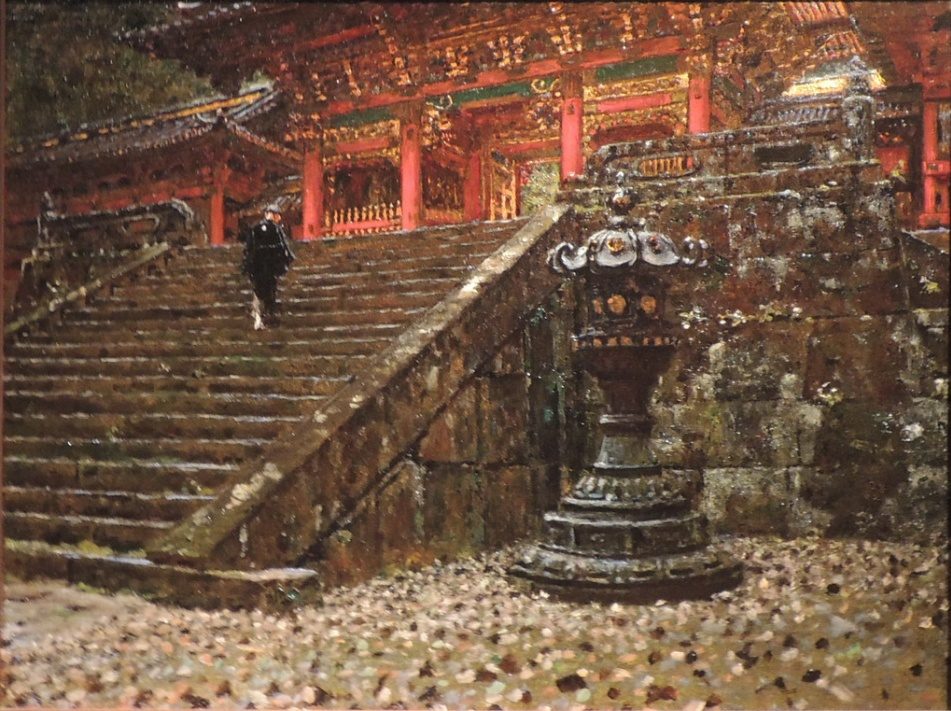
Shrine in Nikkō

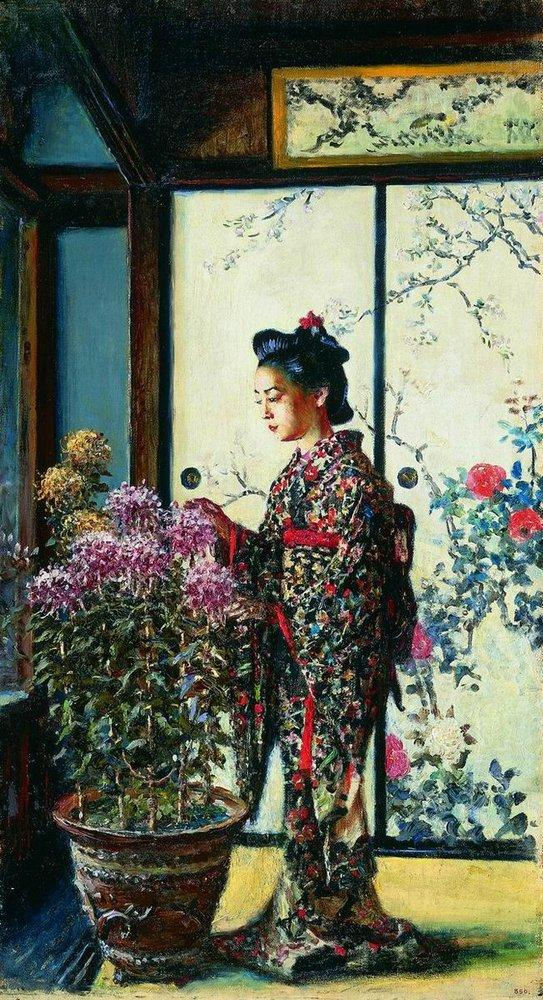
Japanese woman

== See also ==
- List of paintings of Vasily Vereshchagin
- List of Orientalist artists
- Orientalism
