= Zendan =

Zendan, Zindan, or Zandan (Persian: زندان) are transliteration variants of the Persian word for "dungeon", "prison". It may refer to:

== Buildings ==
- Zandan Tower, former Ottoman defensive and prison tower in Bitola, North Macedonia
- Zendan Castle, castle located in Deyr County, Bushehr Province, Iran
- Zindan Fortress, part of the Lankaran Fortress, now in Azerbaijan

== Populated places ==
- Zandan, Kurdistan
- Zendan, Kerman
- Zindan, Iran
- Zindan (Sanaa), sub-district located in Arhab District, Sana'a Governorate, Yemen
