= Turkestan Series =

Paintings by Vasily Vereshchagin

Vereshchagin's Turkestan Series is a collection of paintings produced by Russian artist Vasily Vereshchagin in the 19th century. The works are in the collections of the Tretyakov Gallery in Moscow and the Russian Museum in Saint Petersburg.

== History ==
In the 1867, Vereshchagin (who had recently finished studying painting in Paris) was informed that the Governor of Russian Turkestan, Konstantin von Kaufmann, required cartographers and painters for military service in Imperial Russia's Central Asian territories. Enticed by the freedom such a position would provide, Vereshchagin enlisted and was deployed to Samarkand in Turkestan, where a war had recently broken out between Russia and the Emirate of Bukhara.

In the several years of intermittent fighting that followed, Vereshchagin was attached to the Russian army; he painted, and on occasion fought against the various nations that opposed Russian expansion into Central Asia. Per his role as a war artist, many of Vereshchagin's works depict battle scenes; however, the artist also produced (both during his military service and during a second trip after his service had ended) a number of ethnographic and landscape paintings depicting the scenery of Central Asia. Many of these paintings, though classified as orientalist, were realistic and relatively uncensored, a fact that was in stark contrast to the works of Vereshchagin's Russian contemporaries. As noted by one source, Vereshchagin's work exudes feelings of decline and decay; many scenes he painted feature death, and the artist often painted the ruins of once-great civilizations that had since gone into decline. As Vereshchagin himself noted, "My main purpose [was]…to describe the barbarism with which until now the entire way of life and order of Central Asia has been saturated."

Following his second trip to Turkestan in 1869, Vereshchagin (who was residing in Munich) began producing a series of paintings that would become known as his "Turkestan Series". These 13 works of art were painted between 1869 and 1872; some were imaginary pieces, but most were renderings of scenes that Vereshchagin had observed while in Turkestan.

Upon the completion of his works, Vereshchagin chose to present his collection of paintings at the Crystal Palace in London, as Russia was at the time considered an artistic backwater. In Britain, his work was well-received. Upon his return to Russia, Vereshchagin's paintings were likewise well-received by the general public. However, his depiction of the brutal nature of the war and of the Russian war dead displeased some members of the Russian military, who saw the depiction of dead Russian soldiers as being defeatist and unpatriotic. Two of his works in particular, The Apotheosis of War and Left Behind, were singled out for criticism. Regardless, Vereshchagin was able to sell many of his paintings to a private buyer, Sergei Tretyakov. Upon Tretyakov's death in 1892, his collection of art, including the Turkestan Series, was donated to city of Moscow. From there, the paintings of the series were split between the Tretyakov Gallery in Moscow and the Russian Museum in Saint Petersburg.

== Gallery ==
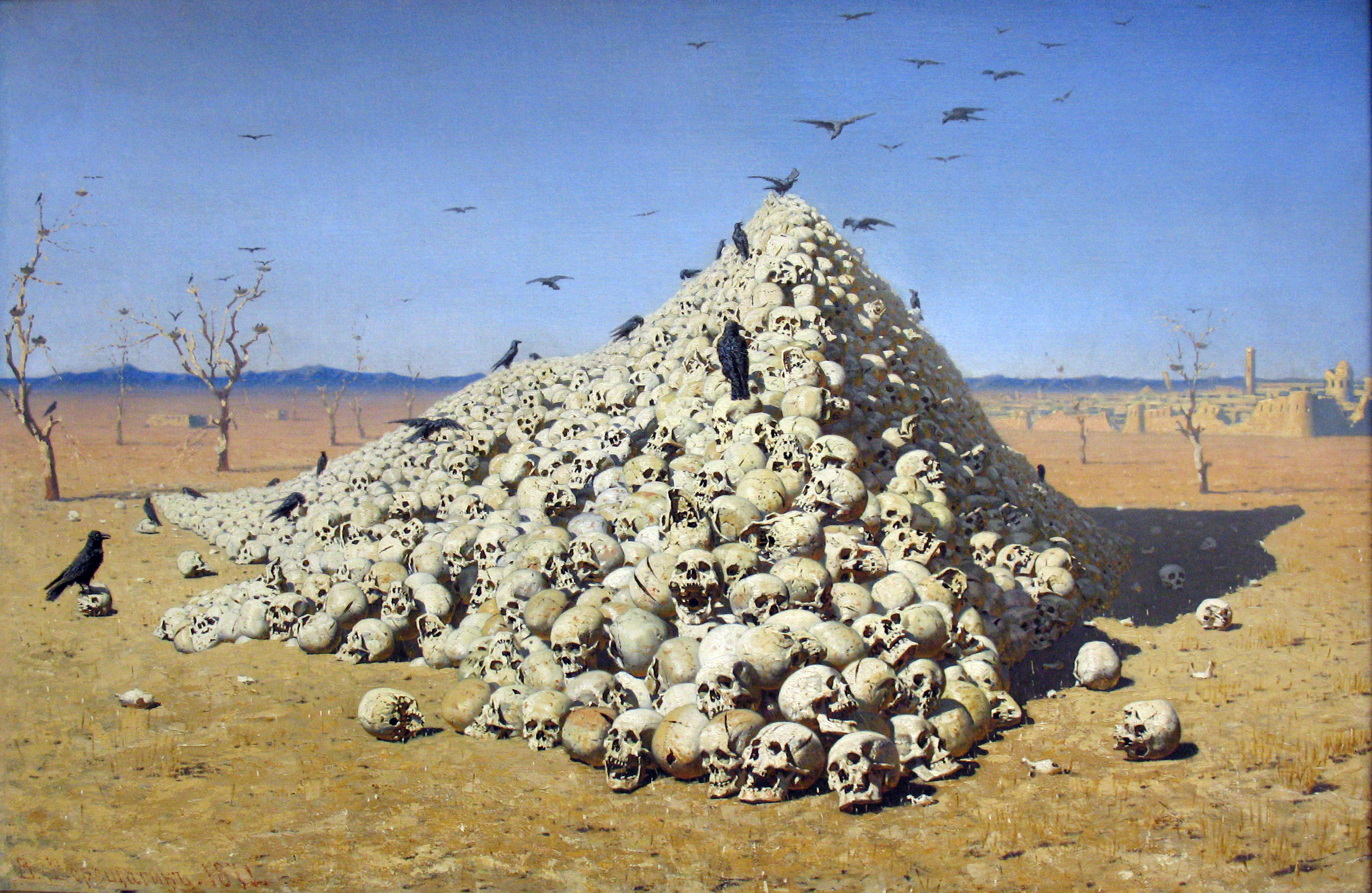
The Apotheosis of War, 1872, oil on canvas

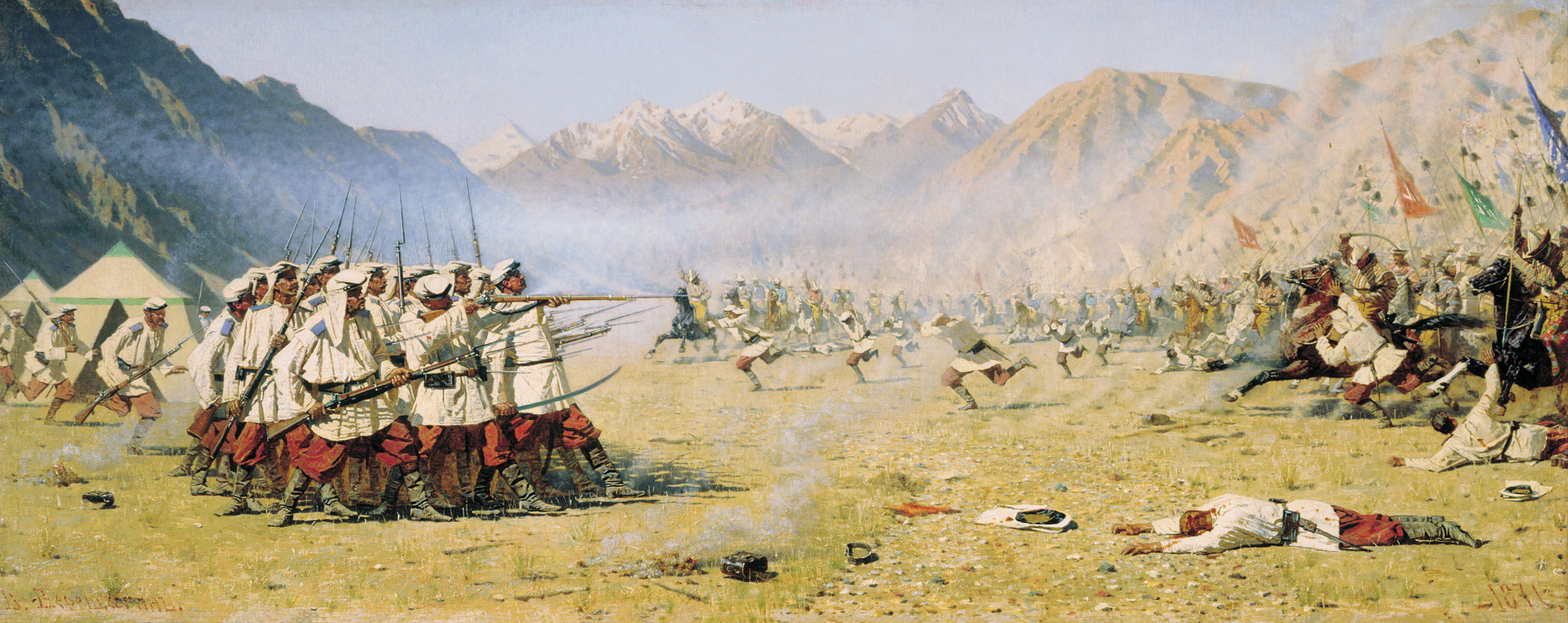
A Surprise Attack, 1871, oil on canvas
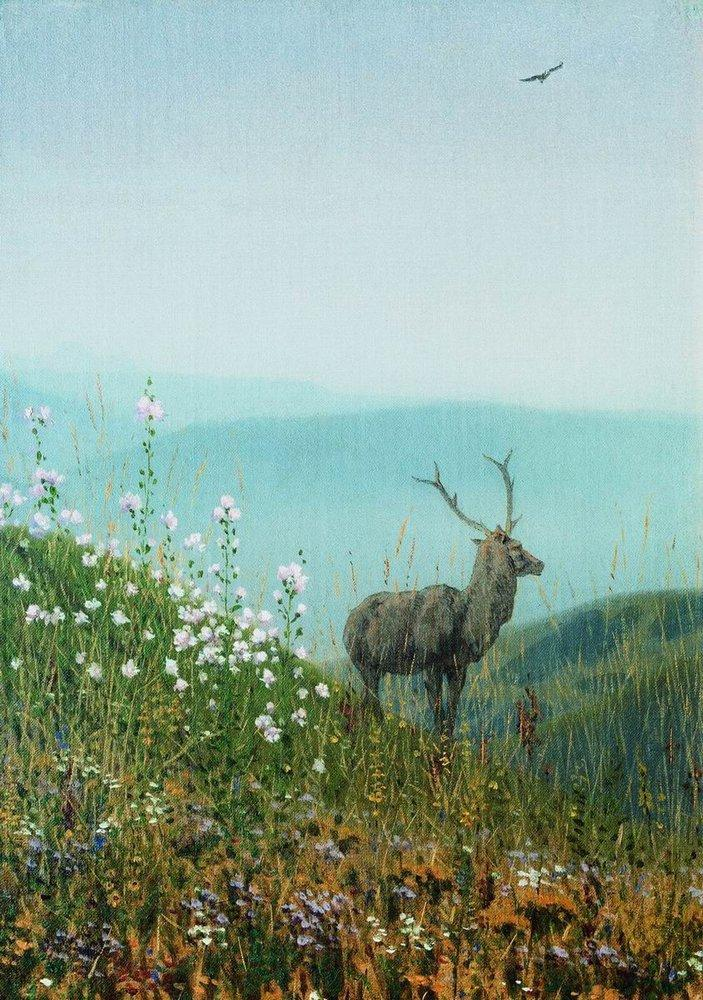
In the Alatau Mountains, circa 1870, oil on canvas

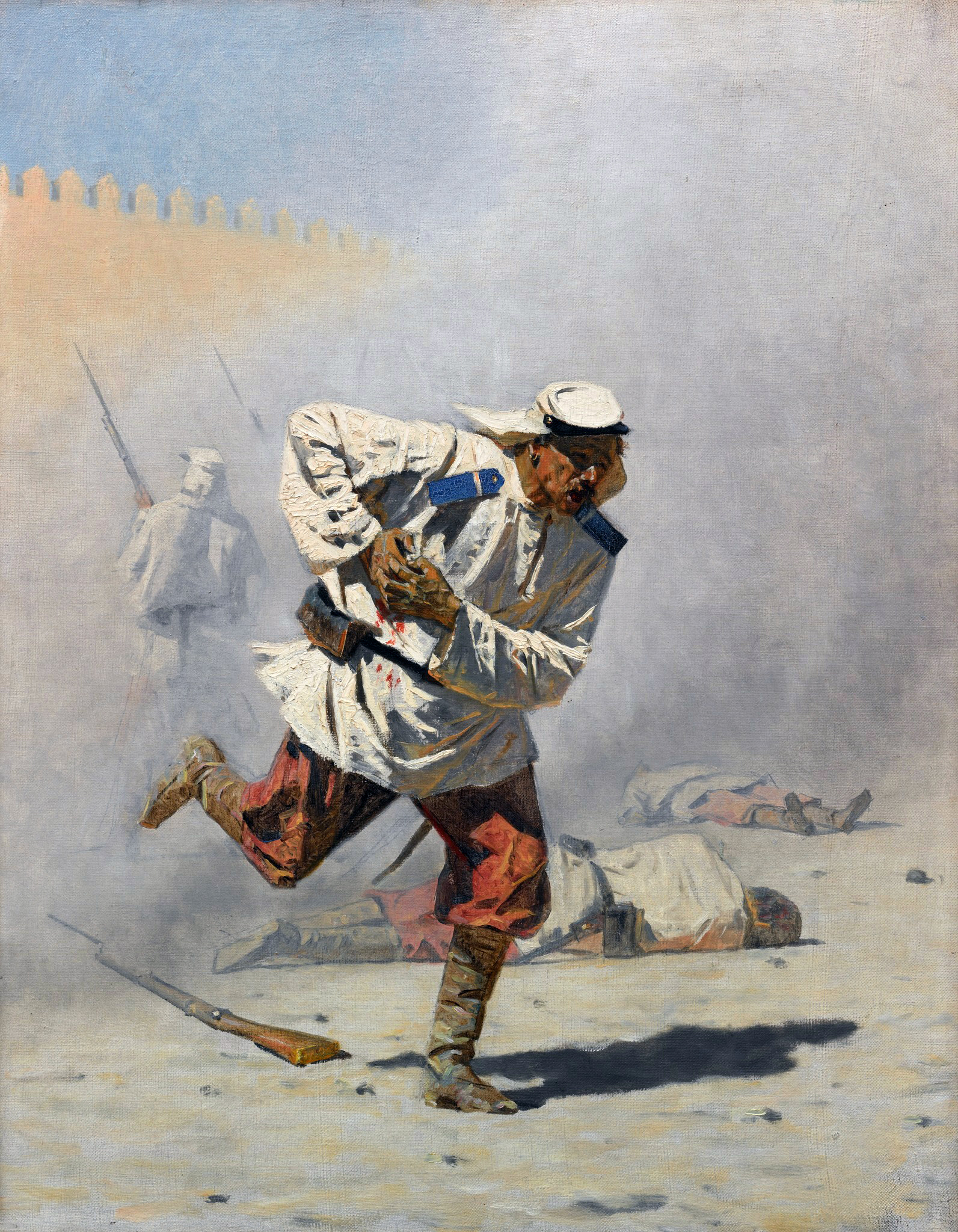
Mortally Wounded, 1873, oil on canvas

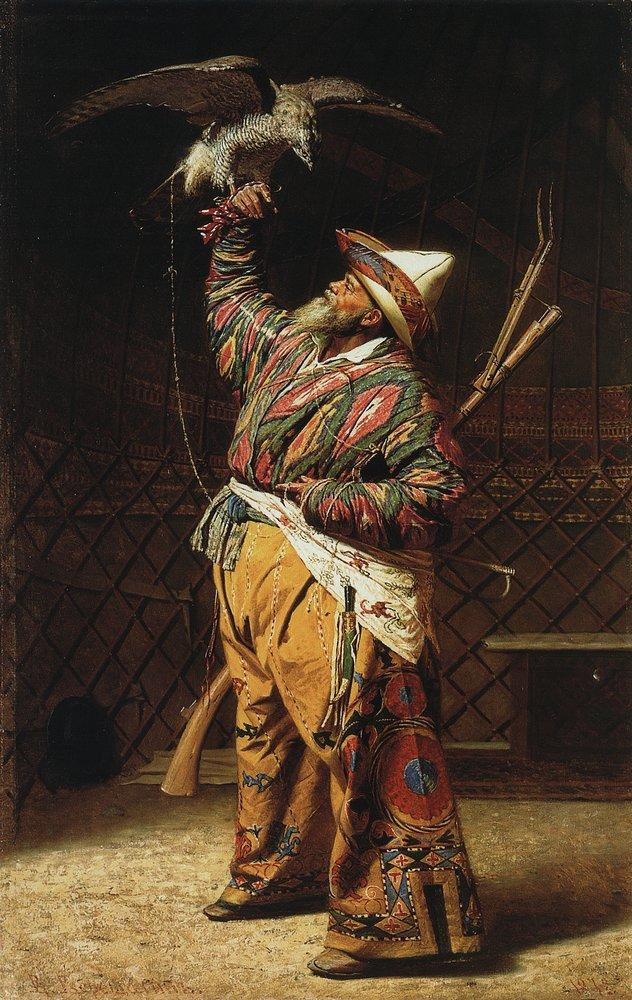
A Rich Kyrgyz Hunter with a Falcon

== See also ==
- List of paintings by Vasily Vereshchagin
