= Conquest =

Act of forceful subjugation

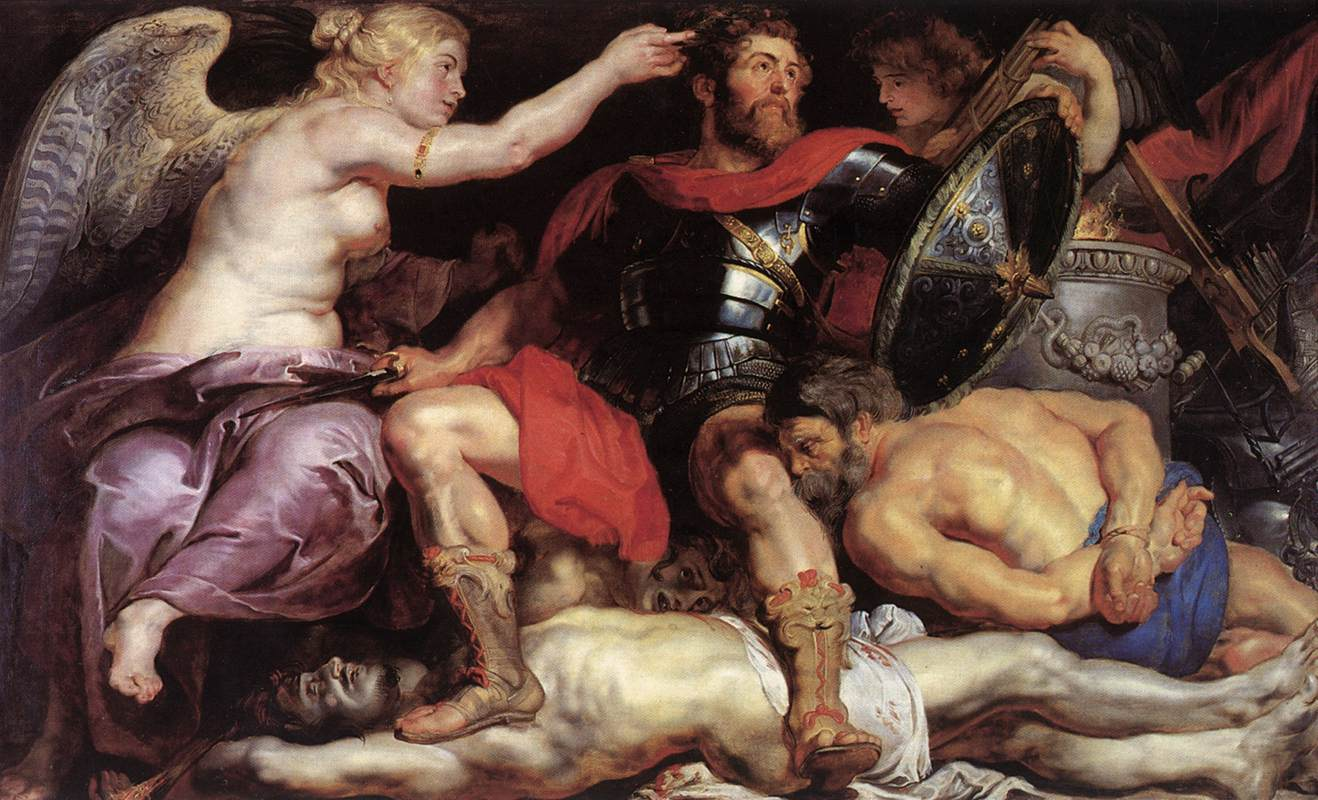
The Triumph of Victory by Peter Paul Rubens (painted c. 1614)

Conquest involves achieving control of another entity's territory using military forces. Historically, conquests occurred frequently in the international order, and practical norms hardly governed them under rule of law, including in military and international law. After World War I, as the League of Nations was established and, after World War II, with the United Nations, prohibitions against conquests were codified. Scholars have debated the role of norms against conquest.

== History ==
Many civilizations engaged in military conquest, with examples being the Roman Republic (and the eventual Empire), Greek states such as ancient Athens and Sparta, and the Achaemenid Empire.

The ancient civilized peoples conducted wars on a large scale that were, in effect, conquests. In Egypt the effects of invasion and conquest are to be seen in different racial types represented in paintings and sculptures.

Improved agriculture production facilitated division of labour, including the formation of larger, professional militaries and improved military technology. With population growth and hierarchical political organization, war became more widespread and destructive.

=== Norms against conquest ===
Scholars have debated the existence of a norm against conquest since 1945. Conquest of large swaths of territory has been rare, but states have since 1945 continued to pursue annexation of small swaths of territory.

The Russo-Ukrainian War can be considered a contemporary example of a war of conquest, taking into account that during the conflict there was, even if illegally in the eyes of international law, the Russian annexation of Crimea and parts of four southeast Ukrainian oblasts in 2014 and 2022, respectively. On the Russian precedent, Tanisha Fazal writes,

Norms die slowly. Attempted land grabs as big and brazen as Russia's in 2022 are likely to remain rare, at least for now. But as aggressors go more or less unpunished, states may increasingly act on territorial claims in murky jurisdictions—those least likely to trigger a significant international response. These small-scale attacks may prove most damaging to the norm against territorial conquest. As violence ticks up, the larger web of rules and institutions that make up the international system could begin to come undone. Although far from inevitable, the norm's demise would leave the world in dangerous terrain.

== Concepts ==
=== Effects on migration ===
Military conquest is one of the most persistent causes of human migrations.

=== Plunder ===
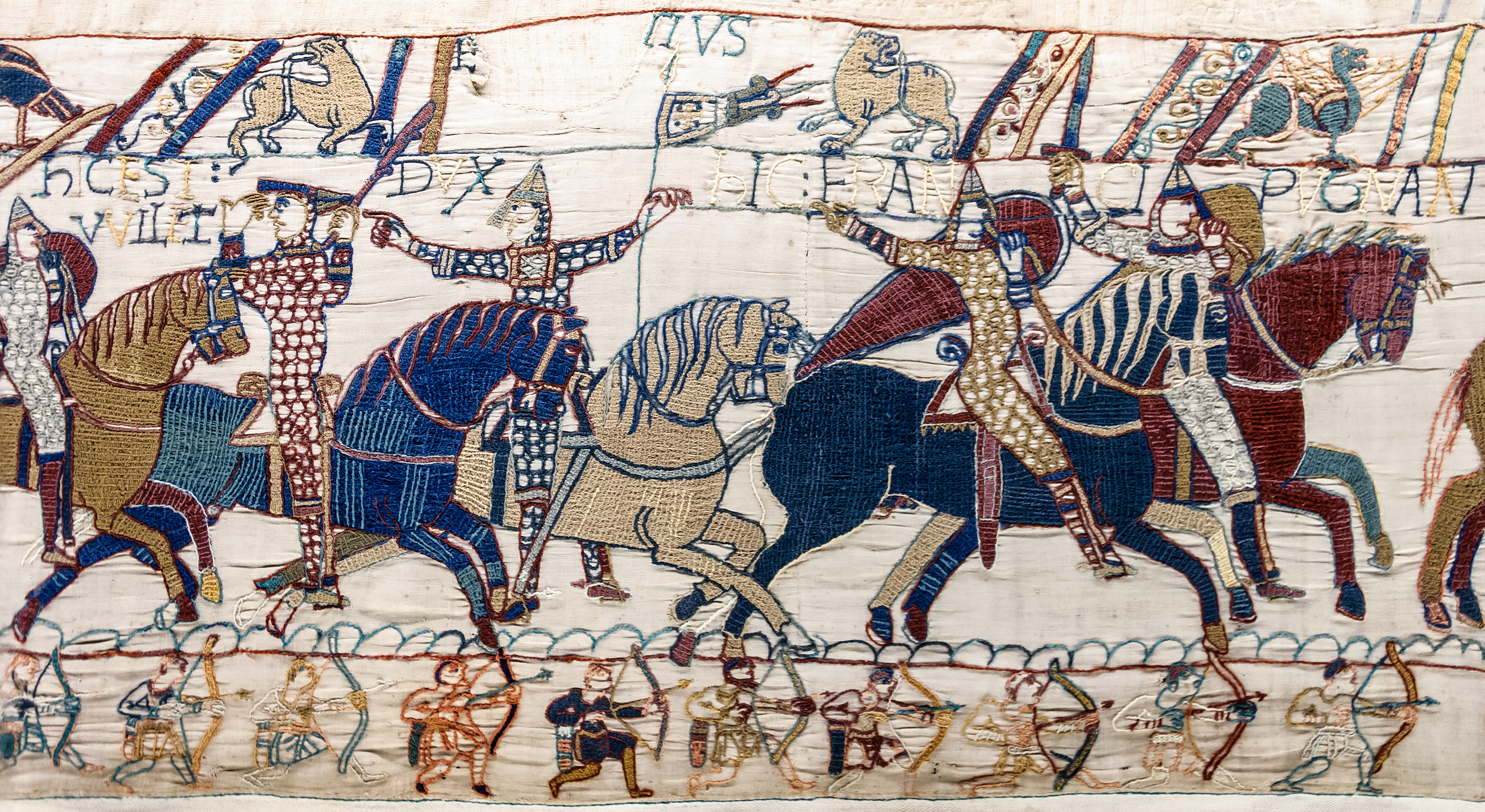
William the Conqueror leads his troops at the Battle of Hastings, 1066, Bayeux Tapestry.

Looting by a victorious army during war has been a common practice throughout recorded history. In the wake of the Napoleonic Wars and particularly after World War II, norms against wartime plunder became widely accepted. In modern armed conflicts, looting is prohibited by international law, and constitutes a war crime.

=== Imperialism ===
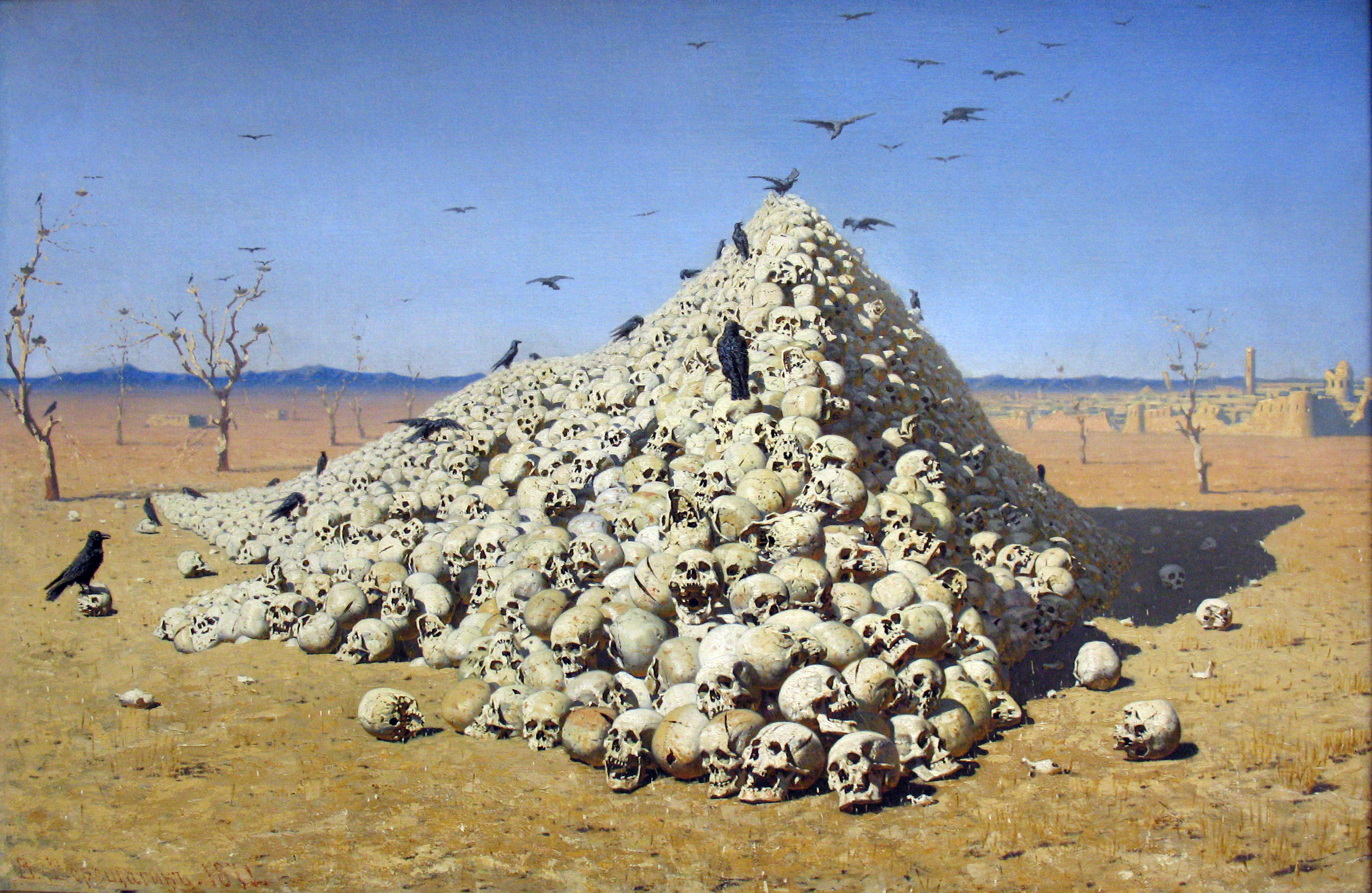
Vasily Vereshchagin, The Apotheosis of War, 1871; dedicated "to all conquerors, past, present and to come", a pile of skulls in a wasteland.

Imperialism is the maintaining and extending of power over foreign nations, particularly through expansionism, employing both hard power (military and economic power) and soft power (diplomatic power and cultural imperialism). Imperialism focuses on establishing or maintaining hegemony and a more formal empire.

=== Recapture ===
The right of countries to engage in self-defence against a war of aggression is enshrined in the Article 51 of the UN Charter. Military occupation can be seen as a continued attack against the self-determination of the occupied country. Some argue the right to armed recapture of illegally occupied territories increases with the passage of time.

=== Methods of Conquest ===
The Ottomans used a method of gradual, non-military conquest in which they established suzerainty over their neighbours and then displaced their ruling dynasties. This concept was first systematized by Halil İnalcık. Conquests of this sort did not involve violent revolution but were a process of slow assimilation, established by bureaucratic means such as registers of population and resources as part of the feudal timar system.

== See also ==
- Imperialism
- Invasion
- Right of conquest
- Victory
- War of independence
- War of aggression
