= List of paintings by Vasily Vereshchagin =

The list contains information about the paintings of the Russian artist Vasily Vereshchagin (1842–1904). It is based on the "List of works by V.V. Vereshchagin stored in museums of the USSR" compiled by Andrey Lebedev.

== Paintings ==
=== Studies from a journey through the Caucasus in 1865 ===
#	Painting	Title	Year created	Technique	Dimensions (cm)	Gallery	Notes
1		Старик молоканин	1865	Canvas, oil	30,5 × 22,5	Kyiv Art Gallery	
1		Молодой молоканин	1865	Canvas, oil	22,5 × 17,3	Kyiv Art Gallery	
1		Молоканка в красном сарафане	1865	Canvas glued on canvas, oil	32 × 21,4	Kyiv Art Gallery	
1		Старик-молоканин в светлой сорочке	1865	Canvas, oil	23 × 16,8	Kyiv Art Gallery	

=== Studies and a sketch of the unrealized painting "Burlaks" (1866) ===
#	Painting	Title	Year created	Technique	Dimensions (cm)	Gallery	Notes
1		Бурлак, держащийся руками за лямку	1866	Canvas on cardboard, oil	34 × 22,8	Tretyakov Gallery	
1		Бурлак с шапкою в руке	1866	Canvas on cardboard, oil	31,8 × 22,1	Tretyakov Gallery	
1		Бурлак с низко наклонённой головой	1866	Canvas on cardboard, oil	32,8 × 23,2	Tretyakov Gallery	
1		Бурлаки	1866	Canvas, oil	17,5 × 33	Kyiv Art Gallery	

=== Studies from the first journey to Turkestan (1867–1868) ===
#	Painting	Title	Year created	Technique	Dimensions (cm)	Gallery	Notes
1		Татарин из Оренбургской тюрьмы	1867	Canvas, oil	16,7 × 14,7	Государственный музей изобразительных искусств Республики Татарстан	
1		Казах в меховой шапке	1867	Canvas, oil	16,3 × 12	Kyiv Art Gallery	
1		Мальчик-узбек	1867	Canvas, oil	30 × 22,5	Tretyakov Gallery	
1		Портрет мужчины в белой чалме	1867 (8?)	Canvas, oil	38 × 28,5	Russian Museum	(Note: В списке Лебедева – «Этюд головы» (1867).)
1		Голова молодого человека	1867–1868	Canvas, oil	32,5 × 25,5	Russian Museum	(Note: В списке Лебедева – «Портрет неизвестного (Южный тип)» (1880–1901).)
1		Казах в национальном головном уборе	1867	Canvas, oil	16,3 × 12	Kyiv Art Gallery	
1		Люлли (цыган)	1867–1868	Canvas, oil	29,7 × 20	Tretyakov Gallery	
1		Портрет бачи	1867–1868	Canvas, oil	27 × 20,5	Tretyakov Gallery	
1		Улица среднеазиатского города	1867–1868	Canvas, oil	19,5 × 29,5	Kyiv Art Gallery	
1		Тамерлановы ворота в ущелье Джелан-Уты	1868	Canvas, oil	41,2 × 28,2	Государственный музей изобразительных искусств Республики Татарстан	
1		Самарканд	1868	Canvas, oil	43 × 51	Серпуховский историко-художественный музей	
1		Афганец	1868	Canvas, oil	41,5 × 26,8	Tretyakov Gallery	

=== Paintings created in 1868 based on materials from the first trip to Turkestan in 1867–1868 ===
#	Painting	Title	Year created	Technique	Dimensions (cm)	Gallery	Notes
1		Опиумоеды (Eaters of Opium)	1868	Canvas, oil	40 × 47	Museum of Arts of Uzbekistan	
1		После удачи (Победители)	1868	Canvas, oil	46,5 × 32,5	Russian Museum	
1		После неудачи	1868	Canvas, oil	47,5 × 39,5	Russian Museum	
1		"Bacha and His Admirers" (Бача со своими поклонниками)	1868	photo of the painting		destroyed; only a photo preserved	

=== Studies from a journey through the Semirechye region and a second journey through Turkestan (1869–1870) ===
#	Painting	Title	Year created	Technique	Dimensions (cm)	Gallery	Notes
1		Верблюд во дворе караван-сарая	1869–1870	Canvas, oil	27,3 × 36,2	Tretyakov Gallery	
1		Дервиши-дуваны	1869–1870	Wood, oil	41 × 32,1	Ivanovo Oblast Art Museum	
1		Киргиз	1869–1870	Canvas, oil	26,4 × 18,5	Tretyakov Gallery	
1		Киргизские кибитки на реке Чу	1869–1870	Canvas, oil	28,1 × 41,1	Tretyakov Gallery	
1		Внутренность юрты богатого киргиза	1869–1870	Canvas, oil	26,6 × 36,1	Tretyakov Gallery	
1		Киргизские кочевья	1869 (70?)	Canvas, oil	17,5 × 17	Russian Museum	
1		Перекочёвка киргизов	1869–1870	Canvas, oil	26,5 × 36	Tretyakov Gallery	
1		Перекочёвка киргизов	1869–1870	Canvas, oil	27 × 36,2	Tretyakov Gallery	
1		Женщина племени солонов	1869–1870	Canvas, oil	28 × 24	Tretyakov Gallery	
1		Развалины китайской кумирни. Ак-Кент	1869–1870	Canvas, oil	28 × 40,4	Tretyakov Gallery	
1		Солон	1869–1870	Canvas, oil	37,5 × 27	Radishchev Art Museum	
1		Китайский солдат	1869–1870	Canvas, oil	20,5 × 14,5	Дальневосточный художественный музей	
1		Женщины племени солонов	1869–1870	Canvas, oil	36 × 26	Забайкальский краевой краеведческий музей имени А. К. Кузнецова	
1		Китайский домик	1869–1870	Canvas, oil	27 × 36	Tretyakov Gallery	
1		Молельня солонов. Ак-Кент	1869–1870	Canvas, oil	36,4 × 27,3	Tretyakov Gallery	
1		Дети племени солонов	1869–1870	Canvas, oil	36,5 × 26,6	Tretyakov Gallery	
1		Ойратский (калмыцкий) лама в ритуальном головном уборе	1869–1870	Canvas, oil	24 × 20	Ярославский художественный музей	
1		Калмык на лошади в степи	1869–1870	Canvas, oil	25,2 × 35	Калужский музей изобразительных искусств	
1		Калмыцкая молельня	1869–1870	Canvas, oil	27,2 × 38	Tretyakov Gallery	
1		Озеро Иссык-Куль	1869–1870	Canvas, oil	17 × 26,8	Tretyakov Gallery	
1		Озеро Ала-Куль	1869–1870	Canvas, oil	27,3 × 36	Томский областной художественный музей	
1		Близ озера Ала-Куль	1869–1870	Canvas, oil	10 × 19	Дальневосточный художественный музей	
1		Развалины театра в Чугучаке	1869–1870	Canvas, oil	27 × 38	Tretyakov Gallery	
1		Садовая калитка в Чугучаке	1869–1870	Canvas, oil	36 × 27	Tretyakov Gallery	
1		Развалины Чугучака	1869–1870	Wood, oil	18 × 38	Tretyakov Gallery	
1		В Чугучаке	1869–1870	Canvas, oil	24,3 × 35,3	Kyiv Art Gallery	
1		Развалины в Чугучаке	1869 (70?)	Canvas, oil	25,5 × 35,5	Russian Museum	
1		Всадники, переплывающие реку	1869–1870	Canvas, oil	17 × 27	Russian Museum	
1		Восточный орнамент	1869–1870	Canvas on cardboard, oil	25,5 × 18,5	Russian Museum	(Note: В списке Лебедева помещено среди этюдов неопределённых серий.)
1		Китайская палатка	1869–1870	Canvas, oil	18,2 × 26,7	Tretyakov Gallery	
1		Горы, окружающие Лепсинскую станицу	1869–1870	Canvas, oil	26,8 × 18,5	Государственный музей искусств Казахстана имени А. Кастеева	
1		Проход Барскаун	1869–1870	Canvas, oil	26,5 × 26,5	Астраханская картинная галерея имени П. М. Догадина	
1		Проход Барскаун	1869–1870	Canvas, oil	26,8 × 36,1	Краснодарский краевой художественный музей имени Ф. А. Коваленко	
1		Проход Барскаун	1869–1870	Canvas, oil	27,3 × 36,1	Калужский музей изобразительных искусств	
1		Проход Барскаун	1869–1870	Canvas, oil	17 × 26,3	Череповецкое музейное объединение	
1		В горах Алатау	1869–1870	Canvas, oil	40,9 × 28	Tretyakov Gallery	
1		В горах Алатау	1869–1870	Canvas, oil	40,2 × 27,6	Tretyakov Gallery	
1		В горах Алатау	1869–1870	Canvas, oil	36,3 × 27	Tretyakov Gallery	
1		Кочевая дорога в горах Алатау	1869–1870	Canvas glued on canvas, oil	36,5 × 27	Tretyakov Gallery	
1		Снеговые вершины хребта Кыргызин Алатау	1869–1870	Canvas, oil	27,2 × 36,3	Краснодарский краевой художественный музей имени Ф. А. Коваленко	
1		Медресе Шир-Дор на площади Регистан в Самарканде	1869–1870	Canvas, oil	27,3 × 36,7	Tretyakov Gallery	
1		Мавзолей Шахи-Зинда в Самарканде	1869–1870	Canvas, oil	26,8 × 36,6	Tretyakov Gallery	
1		Главная улица в Самарканде с высоты цитадели ранним утром	1869–1870	Canvas, oil	28,7 × 40,8	Tretyakov Gallery	
1		Гур-Эмир. Мечеть над гробницей Тамерлана	1869–1870	Canvas, oil	23,2 × 33	Дальневосточный художественный музей	
1		Мавзолей Гур-Эмир. Самарканд	1869–1870	Canvas, oil	36,8 × 27	Tretyakov Gallery	
1		Афганец	1869–1870	Canvas, oil	42,6 × 28,9	Tretyakov Gallery	
1		В Туркестане	1869–1870	Canvas, oil	27 × 21	Пензенская областная картинная галерея имени К. А. Савицкого	
1		Озеро в горах	1869–1870	Canvas, oil	23,2 × 26,8	Kyiv Art Gallery	

=== Paintings painted in Tashkent in 1870 ===
#	Painting	Title	Year created	Technique	Dimensions (cm)	Gallery	Notes
1		Политики в опиумной лавочке	1870	Canvas, oil	67,8 × 47,1	Tretyakov Gallery	
1		Нищие в Самарканде	1870	Canvas, oil	51,8 × 38,1	Tretyakov Gallery	
1		Дервиши в праздничных нарядах	1870	Canvas, oil	71,6 × 47,2	Tretyakov Gallery	
1		Хор дервишей, просящих милостыню	1870	Canvas, oil	71,7 × 49,6	Tretyakov Gallery	

=== Paintings created in 1871–1874 in Munich and St. Petersburg based on studies from travels to Turkestan ===
#	Painting	Title	Year created	Technique	Dimensions (cm)	Gallery	Notes
1		Богатый киргизский охотник с соколом	1871	Canvas, oil	113 × 72,2	Tretyakov Gallery	
1		ru:У крепостной стены. Пусть войдут	1871	Canvas, oil	95 × 160,5	Tretyakov Gallery	
1		У крепостной стены. Вошли!	1871	Colorized photo of the painting		destroyed	
1		Нападают врасплох	1871	Canvas, oil	82 × 206,7	Tretyakov Gallery	
1		The Apotheosis of War	1871	Canvas, oil	127 × 197	Tretyakov Gallery	
1		Представляют трофеи	1872	Canvas, oil	240,8 × 171,5	Tretyakov Gallery	
1		Продажа ребёнка-невольника	1872	Canvas, oil	123 × 92,4	Tretyakov Gallery	
1		Торжествуют	1872	Canvas, oil	195,5 × 257	Tretyakov Gallery	
1		Парламентёры. «Сдавайся!» – «Убирайся к чёрту!»	1873	Canvas, oil	58,4 × 74	Tretyakov Gallery	
1		Смертельно раненный	1873	Canvas, oil	73 × 56,6	Tretyakov Gallery	
1		Высматривают	1873	Canvas, oil	81 × 103	Tretyakov Gallery	
1		Китаец	1873	Canvas, oil	33,2 × 21,3	Tretyakov Gallery	
1		Узбек поющий Singing Uzbek	1873	Canvas, oil	33 × 25,5	Museum of Arts of Uzbekistan	
1		Индиец	1873	Canvas, oil	27,6 × 19,8	Tretyakov Gallery	
1		Киргизка	1873	Canvas, oil	34 × 28	Tretyakov Gallery	
1		Киргизка	1873	Canvas, oil	40 × 31	Tretyakov Gallery	
1		Калмыцкий лама	1873	Canvas, oil	38,9 × 48,5	Tretyakov Gallery	
1		Узбекская женщина в Ташкенте	1873	Canvas, oil	36 × 26	Tretyakov Gallery	
1		Узбек, продавец посуды	1873	Canvas, oil	20 × 16	Tretyakov Gallery	
1		Узбекский сотник (юзбаш)	1873	Canvas, oil	57,1 × 34,5	Tretyakov Gallery	
1		Калмыцкий лама	1873	Canvas, oil	37,5 × 27,5	Russian Museum	
1		Двери Тимура (Тамерлана)	1872	Canvas, oil	213 × 168	Tretyakov Gallery	
1		Мулла Рахим и мулла Керим по дороге на базар ссорятся	1873	Canvas, oil	98 × 114,8	Tretyakov Gallery	
1		У дверей мечети	1873	Canvas, oil	315,5 × 237,5	Russian Museum	
1		Самаркандский зиндан Samarkand Zendan	1873	Canvas, oil	326 × 165	Museum of Arts of Uzbekistan	
1		Бухарский солдат (сарбаз)	1873	Canvas, oil	90,7 × 66	Tretyakov Gallery	
1		Туркестанский офицер, когда поход будет	1873	Canvas, oil	33,5 × 18,8	Tretyakov Gallery	
1		Туркестанский офицер, когда похода не будет	1873	Canvas, oil	33 × 18,8	Tretyakov Gallery	
1		Кокандский солдат (сарбаз)	1873	Canvas, oil	34 × 24,5	Tretyakov Gallery	
1		Туркестанский солдат в летней форме	1873	Canvas, oil	33,6 × 18	Приморская государственная картинная галерея	
1		Входные ворота во дворце кокандского хана	1874	Canvas, oil	47 × 68	Ivanovo Oblast Art Museum	
1		Евнух у дверей гарема	начало 1870х	Canvas, oil	93 × 47	Омский областной музей изобразительных искусств имени М. А. Врубеля	

Vereshchagin destroyed three paintings from the Turkestan War, "Окружили — преследуют" ("Encircled — Being Pursuew), "Забытый" ("Forgotten") "У крепостной стены. Вошли!" ("By a Fortress Wall. Entered!"), after a 1974 exposition in St. Petersburg, where they were harshly criticized for tendentiousness.

=== Paintings based on Turkestan studies in the 1870s and early 1880s ===
#	Painting	Title	Year created	Technique	Dimensions (cm)	Gallery	Notes
1		Людоед	конец 1870-х – начало 1880-х	Canvas, oil	199 × 298	Николаевский художественный музей имени В. В. Верещагина	

=== Studies from the first journey to India (1874–1876) ===
#	Painting	Title	Year created	Technique	Dimensions (cm)	Gallery	Notes
1		Бания (торговец). Бомбей	1874	Wood, oil	32 × 24,3	Tretyakov Gallery	
1		Факир Бомбейской провинции	1874–1876	Wood, oil	24 × 18,6	Tretyakov Gallery	
1		Священник парс (огнепоклонник). Бомбей	1874–1875	Wood, oil	32 × 24	Tretyakov Gallery	
1		Факир	1874–1876	Wood, oil	24,2 × 18,8	Tretyakov Gallery	
1		Факиры	1874–1876	Wood, oil	24,2 × 18,7	Tretyakov Gallery	
1		Два факира	1874–1876	Wood, oil	24 × 18,5	Tretyakov Gallery	
1		Факир	1874–1876	Wood, oil	24,4 × 19	Омский областной музей изобразительных искусств имени М. А. Врубеля	
1		Колонны пещерного храма в Аджанте	1874	Canvas, oil	39,1 × 28	Tretyakov Gallery	
1		Молодая женщина. Декан	1874	Wood, oil	18 × 14,8	Tretyakov Gallery	
1		Бхил	1874	Canvas, oil	36,2 × 27,2	Tretyakov Gallery	
1		Подземная галерея в Эллоре	1874	Canvas, oil	27,1 × 39	Воронцовский дворец (Алупка)	
1		Статуя Вишну в храме Индры в Эллоре	1874	Canvas, oil	41 × 29	Tretyakov Gallery	
1		Вечер на озере. Один из павильонов на Мраморной набережной в Раджнагаре (княжество Удайпур)	1874	Canvas, oil	28,4 × 40,6	Tretyakov Gallery	
1		Раджнагар. Мраморная, украшенная барельефами набережная на озере в Удайпуре	1874	Canvas, oil	28,6 × 40,2	Tretyakov Gallery	
1		Колоннада в Джаинском храме на горе Абу вечером	1874–1876	Canvas, oil	39 × 28,3	Russian Museum	
1		Буддийский храм в Дарджилинге. Сикким	1874	Canvas, oil	38 × 40,7	Tretyakov Gallery	
1		Вид главных высот Гималаев из Дарджилинга в Сиккиме	1874–1875	Canvas, oil	20 × 28,4	Томский областной художественный музей	
1		В Гималаях. Гора Джонгри зимой	1875	Canvas, oil	26,5 × 38	Kyiv Art Gallery	
1		Три главные божества в буддийском монастыре Чингачелинг в Сиккиме	1875	Canvas, oil	27,3 × 40,1	Tretyakov Gallery	
1		Гималаи вечером	1875	Canvas, oil	39,5 × 28	Tretyakov Gallery	
1		Лама так называемой Красной секты в полном облачении	1875	Canvas, oil	39,3 × 26,6	Kyiv Art Gallery	
1		Буддийский лама на празднике в монастыре Пемиончи. Сикким	1875	Canvas, oil	40,5 × 28	Tretyakov Gallery	
1		Тибетский лама (в полном облачении)	1875	Wood, oil	27,8 × 19,4	Дальневосточный художественный музей	
1		Лама в костюме для религиозного танца «Цам»	1875	Canvas glued on canvas, oil	26 × 16,5	Kyiv Art Gallery	
1		Буддийский лама в костюме Главного Божества на празднике в монастыре Пемиончи. Сикким	1875	Canvas, oil	41,1 × 28,5	Tretyakov Gallery	
1		Главный храм монастыря Тассидинг. Сикким	1875	Canvas, oil	28,8 × 39,7	Tretyakov Gallery	
1		Горы близ монастыря Тассидинг (посмертные памятники в горах)	1875	Canvas, oil	27 × 19,4	Kyiv Art Gallery	
1		Молодая девушка из знатного семейства Сиккима	1875	Canvas glued on cCanvas, oil	18,2 × 10	Kyiv Art Gallery	
1		Як	1875	Canvas glued on canvas, oil	20 × 25,8	Kyiv Art Gallery	
1		Женщина из Бутана с зобом	1875	Canvas, oil	25 × 19	Омский областной музей изобразительных искусств имени М. А. Врубеля	
1		Кули (носильщик)	1875	Wood, oil	24,5 × 15	Kyiv Art Gallery	
1		Озеро в Кашмире	1875	Canvas, oil	23 × 29	Переславский музей-заповедник	
1		Горный ручей в Кашмире	1875	Canvas, oil	28 × 24	Tretyakov Gallery	
1		Озеро в горах	1875	Canvas, oil	14,7 × 19,7	Kyiv Art Gallery	
1		Ночь на реке в Кашмире	1875	Canvas, oil	17 × 19	Tretyakov Gallery	
1		Монастырь в скале. Ладакх	1875	Wood, oil	27 × 21	Kyiv Art Gallery	
1		Ледник по дороге из Кашмира в Ладак	1875	Canvas, oil	40 × 28,2	Tretyakov Gallery	
1		Гималаи	1875	Canvas glued on canvas, oil	17,5 × 26	Ярославский художественный музей	
1		Посмертные памятники в Ладаке	1875	Canvas, oil	22,3 × 29	Tretyakov Gallery	
1		Молитвенная машина буддистов	1875	Canvas, oil	37,6 × 29	Tretyakov Gallery	
1		Монастырь Хемис в Ладаке	1875	Canvas, oil	28,2 × 40,3	Tretyakov Gallery	
1		Индийский мотив	1875	Canvas, oil	40,5 × 28,5	Вятский художественный музей имени В. М. и А. М. Васнецовых	
1		Яки, караван в Ладаке	1875	Canvas, oil	22 × 27,5	Radishchev Art Museum	
1		Караван яков, нагруженных солью, около озера Цо-Морари, на границе Западного Тибета	1875	Canvas, oil	28 × 41	Tretyakov Gallery	
1		Жители Западного Тибета	1875	Canvas, oil	27,6 × 18,3	Tretyakov Gallery	
1		Гималайский пони	1875	Canvas, oil	20,2 × 27,7	Tretyakov Gallery	
1		Мусульманин шиитской секты в Гималаях	1875	Canvas, oil	17 × 17	Tretyakov Gallery	
1		Моти Масджид (Жемчужная мечеть) в Агре	1874–1876	Canvas, oil	31,7 × 45	Tretyakov Gallery	
1		Ворота Ала-уд-Дина. Старый Дели	1875	Canvas, oil	28,2 × 41	Tretyakov Gallery	
1		Минарет Кутуб-Минар и ворота. Старый Дели	1875	Canvas glued on canvas, oil	39 × 26,5	Kyiv Art Gallery	
1		Ворота около Кутуб-Минара. Старый Дели	1875	Canvas, oil	36,5 × 28,6	Tretyakov Gallery	
1		Повозка в Дели	1875	Canvas, oil	20,3 × 28	Tretyakov Gallery	
1		Повозка богатых людей в Дели	1875	Canvas, oil	28,5 × 41,1	Tretyakov Gallery	
1		Гробница султана Ильтутмыша в старом Дели	1875	Canvas, oil	28,6 × 40,9	Tretyakov Gallery	
1		Тронный зал Великих Моголов Шах-Джахана и Аурангзеба в форте Дели	1875	Canvas, oil	39 × 45,5	Tretyakov Gallery	
1		Небольшой браминский храм в Удайпуре	1875	Cardboard, oil	29 × 41,5	Национальная картинная галерея Армении	
1		Гробница Шейха Селима Чишти в Фатехпур-Сикри	1875	Canvas, oil	46 × 34	Tretyakov Gallery	
1		Дворик в гареме дворца Фатехпур-Сикри	1875	Canvas, oil	38,9 × 46,3	Ivanovo Oblast Art Museum	
1		Наружный вид дома Бирбаля в Фатехпур-Сикри	1875	Canvas, oil	36,5 × 44	Kyiv Art Gallery	
1		В Джайпуре	1875–1876	Canvas, oil	26,4 × 23,9	Kyiv Art Gallery	
1		Совар – правительственный посыльный	1874–1876	Wood, oil	21,7 × 15,6	Kyiv Art Gallery	
1		Голова индуса	1874–1876	Canvas, oil	30 × 21	Одесский художественный музей	
1		Мавзолей Тадж-Махал в Агре	1874–1876	Canvas, oil	38,7 × 54	Tretyakov Gallery	
1		Мавзолей Тадж-Махал	1874–1876	Canvas, oil	186,5 × 142	Российский национальный музей музыки (Музей-квартира Николая Голованова)	
1		Розы в Ладаке	1874–1876	Canvas, oil	25,3 × 14,3	Russian Museum	

=== Works painted after 1874–1876 based on studies from the first journey to India ===
#	Painting	Title	Year created	Technique	Dimensions (cm)	Gallery	Notes
1		Всадник в Джайпуре	ок. 1880	Wood, oil	45,8 × 37	Tretyakov Gallery	
1		Всадник-воин в Джайпуре	ок. 1881	Wood, oil	45,8 × 37	Tretyakov Gallery	
1		Elephant Procession. Entry of the Prince of Wales into Jaipur in 1876	ок. 1879	Canvas, oil	497,84 × 695,96	Victoria Memorial, Kolkata	

=== Studies from the second journey through India in 1882–1883 ===
#	Painting	Title	Year created	Technique	Dimensions (cm)	Gallery	Notes
1		Мусульманин-чиновник	1882–1883	Canvas, oil	37 × 28	Tretyakov Gallery	
1		Мусульманин-слуга	1882–1883	Canvas, oil	36 × 28	Tretyakov Gallery	

=== Studies made during the Russo-Turkish War of 1877–1878, as well as in 1878–1879 and 1880 during trips to the Balkans ===
#	Painting	Title	Year created	Technique	Dimensions (cm)	Gallery	Notes
1		Казаки, вступающие в Румынию (Скобелев-отец)	1877	Canvas, oil	14,9 × 22,2	Kyiv Art Gallery	
1		Место битвы 18 июля 1877 г. перед Кришинским редутом под Плевной	1877–1878	Wood, oil	15,5 × 23,5	Kyiv Art Gallery	
1		Под Плевной (В сторожевой цепи)	1877	Wood, oil	10,5 × 15,5	Kyiv Art Gallery	
1		Холмик, с которого Александр II смотрел бомбардировку Плевны	1877–1880	Wood, oil	7,3 × 23,5	Kyiv Art Gallery	
1		Телега для раненых	1877	Wood, oil	9 × 16,5	Kyiv Art Gallery	
1		Угол турецкого редута, взятого М.Д. Скобелевым 30 августа, но снова покинутого 31-го	1877–1878	Wood, oil	10,3 × 15,5	Kyiv Art Gallery	
1		Турецкий редут, под которым убит С. В. Верещагин	1877–1880	Wood, oil	7,7 × 23,6	Kyiv Art Gallery	
1		Дорога около Плевны	1877–1880	Wood, oil	9,3 × 15,57	Kyiv Art Gallery	
1		Последний привал	1877–1880	Wood, oil	80,7 × 109	Пермская государственная художественная галерея	
1		Батарея Мещерского на Шипке	1877–1880	Wood, oil	9 × 137	Kyiv Art Gallery	
1		Переход колонны М.Д. Скобелева через Балканы	1877–1878	Wood, oil	7,5 × 13	Kyiv Art Gallery	
1		Место ночлега Скобелева на Балканах	1877–1878	Wood, oil	15,5 × 11,2	Kyiv Art Gallery	
1		На перевале. Балканы	1877–1880	Wood, oil	15,5 × 12,3	Kyiv Art Gallery	
1		Дорога на перевале через Балканы	1877–1880	Wood, oil	7 × 21,6	Kyiv Art Gallery	
1		Трупы замёрзших турецких солдат	1877–1878	Wood, oil	3,9 × 14,3	Kyiv Art Gallery	
1		Памятник лейб-гренадерам под Горным Дубняком	1877–1880	Wood, oil	6,7 × 19	Kyiv Art Gallery	
1		Близ деревни Радищево под Плевной	1877–1878	Wood, oil	7,3 × 23,5	Kyiv Art Gallery	
1		Павший солдат	ок. 1878	Canvas, oil	22,5 × 32,7	Частное собрание	

=== Paintings on the themes of the Russo-Turkish War of 1877–1878 ===
#	Painting	Title	Year created	Technique	Dimensions (cm)	Gallery	Notes
1		Пикет на Балканах	ок. 1878	Canvas, oil	47 × 38	Kyiv Art Gallery	
1		Снежные траншеи (Русские позиции на Шипкинском перевале)	1878–1881	Canvas, oil	121 × 202	Частное собрание	
1		Шпион	1877–1879	Canvas, oil	100 × 76	Kyiv Art Gallery	
1		Шпион	1877–1879	Canvas, oil	155,5 × 129	Частное собрание	
1		Побеждённые (Панихида)	1878–1879	Canvas, oil	179,7 × 300,4	Tretyakov Gallery	
1		Победители	1878–1879	Canvas, oil	180 × 301	Kyiv Art Gallery	
1		Шипка-Шейново. Скобелев под Шипкой	1878–1879	Canvas, oil	147 × 299	Tretyakov Gallery	
1		Император Александр II под Плевной 30 августа 1877 г.	1878–1879	Canvas, oil	60,5 × 202	Tretyakov Gallery	
1		Пикет на Дунае	1878–1879	Canvas, oil	120 × 200,5	Kyiv Art Gallery	
1		Транспорт раненых	1878–1879	Canvas, oil	101,5 × 352	Частное собрание	
1		Привал военнопленных	1878–1879	Canvas, oil	181,6 × 302,3	Бруклинский музей	
1		Дорога военнопленных (Дорога на Плевну)	1878–1879	Canvas, oil	202,6 × 320,5	Бруклинский музей	
1		Два ястреба (Башибузуки)	1878–1879	Canvas, oil	78,5 × 110	Kyiv Art Gallery	
1		Башибузук (Албанец)	1880–1881	Canvas, oil	126 × 79	ственный музей изобразительных искусств Республики Татарстан	
1		В турецкой покойницкой	1881	Canvas, oil	182 × 450	Николаевский художественный музей имени В. В. Верещагина	
1		Перед атакой. Под Плевной	1881	Canvas, oil	179 × 401	Tretyakov Gallery	
1		Атака	1877–1878	Canvas, oil	181 × 400	Военно-исторический музей артиллерии, инженерных войск и войск связи	Не окончена.
1		После атаки. Перевязочный пункт под Плевной	1881	Canvas, oil	183 × 402	Tretyakov Gallery	
1		Шипка-Шейново (Скобелев под Шипкой)	До 1890	Canvas, oil	188 × 405	Russian Museum	Повторение-вариант одноимённой картины.
1		Адъютант		Canvas, oil	50 × 75,5	Частное собрание	

=== Studies, sketches, and paintings of the Palestine series (1883–1885) ===
#	Painting	Title	Year created	Technique	Dimensions (cm)	Gallery	Notes
1		Римский воин	1883–1885	Canvas, oil	39,5 × 23	Kyiv Art Gallery	
1		Часть стены Соломона в Иерусалиме	1883–1885	Canvas, oil	27,6 × 17,7	Kyiv Art Gallery	
1		Два еврея	1883–1885	Wood, oil	27,2 × 20	Tretyakov Gallery	
1		Стена Соломона	1884–1885	Canvas, oil	199,4 х 151,8	Частное собрание	
1		Голова мужчины	ок. 1884	Canvas, oil	33 × 23,5	Russian Museum	
1		В Иерусалиме. Царские гробницы	1884 (85?)	Canvas, oil	199 × 149	Russian Museum	

=== Paintings and studies on the theme of the death penalty (1880s) ===
#	Painting	Title	Year created	Technique	Dimensions (cm)	Gallery	Notes
1		Blowing from Guns in British India	ок. 1884	Canvas, oil	?	Location unknown	
1		Казнь заговорщиков в России	1884–1885	Canvas, oil	285 × 400	Музей политической истории России	
1		Распятие на кресте у римлян	1887	Canvas, oil	294,6 × 396,2	Частное собрание	

=== Paintings of the "Himalayan Trilogy" (1880s; later continued) ===
#	Painting	Title	Year created	Technique	Dimensions (cm)	Gallery	Notes
1		Орлы (Забытый солдат)	1881–1885	Canvas, oil	455 × 293	Николаевский художественный музей имени В. В. Верещагина	
1		Снега Гималаев. В высшем узле гор, в Сиккиме	1880-е	Canvas, oil	318 × 191	Николаевский художественный музей имени В. В. Верещагина	
1		В Индии. Снега Гималаев	1880-е	Canvas, oil	150 × 318	Николаевский художественный музей имени В. В. Верещагина	

=== Studies and paintings from travels across Russia, Crimea and the Caucasus (1880–1901) ===
#	Painting	Title	Year created	Technique	Dimensions (cm)	Gallery	Notes
1		Московский Кремль зимой	1880–1901	Canvas, oil	18 × 20	Kyiv Art Gallery	
1		Старая Москва	1880–1890	Canvas, oil	70,5 × 101	Russian Museum	(Note: В списке Лебедева помещено среди этюдов неопределённых серий.)
1		Иконостас церкви Иоанна Богослова на Ишне близ Ростова Ярославского	1888	Canvas, oil	60,5 × 45	Russian Museum	
1		Внутренний вид церкви Иоанна Богослова на Ишне близ Ростова Ярославского	1888	Canvas, oil	60 × 45	Russian Museum	
1		Отставной дворецкий	1888	Canvas, oil	47 × 32	Russian Museum	
1		Изразцовая печь	конец 1880-х – 1890-е	Canvas, oil	34 × 25,5	Russian Museum	
1		Вологда	1893–1894	Canvas on cardboard, oil	18 × 22	Вологодская областная картинная галерея	
1		Послушница Вологодского монастыря	1894	Canvas, oil	29,6 × 22	Ульяновский областной художественный музей	
1		Старуха-нищенка 96 лет	1889	Canvas, oil	29,5 × 23	Russian Museum	
1		Перед исповедью на паперти сельской церкви	1888	Canvas, oil	29,5 × 40	Russian Museum	
1		Паперть церкви Иоанна Предтечи в Толчкове. Ярославль	1888	Canvas, oil	44,5 × 59,4	Tretyakov Gallery	
1		Старушка-вологжанка Пахтусова (Кружевница)	1893–1894	Canvas, oil	29,5 × 21	Вологодская областная картинная галерея	
1		Голова зырянина	1894	Canvas, oil	39,3 × 29,3	Russian Museum	
1		Север. Облачный день	1880–1901	Canvas, oil	12,5 × 22,5	Kyiv Art Gallery	
1		Закат солнца в селе Бело-Слуде на реке Мошкурка	1894	Canvas, oil	32 × 39,5	Музей изобразительных искусств Республики Карелия	
1		Иконостас церкви в селе Белая Слуда Вологодской губернии	1894	Canvas, oil	51 × 32,7	Tretyakov Gallery	
1		Дверь древней церкви на Северной Двине	1894	Canvas, oil	21,5 × 21	Череповецкое музейное объединение	
1		Икона Николы с верховьев реки Пинеги	1894	Canvas, oil	27,9 × 21,1	Tretyakov Gallery	
1		Северная Двина	1894	Canvas on cardboard, oil	27,5 × 39	Russian Museum	
1		Северная Двина при закате	1894	Canvas, oil	45 × 60,5	Костромской государственный историко-архитектурный и художественный музей-заповедник	
1		Северная Двина	1894	Canvas on cardboard, oil	14 × 15,5 (в свету)	Вологодская областная картинная галерея	
1		Песчаный островок на Северной Двине	1894	Canvas, oil	15,8 × 24,2	Kyiv Art Gallery	
1		На Северной Двине. Закат	1880–1901	Canvas, oil	14,3 × 21,8	Kyiv Art Gallery	
1		Внутренний вид деревянной церкви Петра и Павла в Пучуге	1894	Canvas, oil	38,7 × 29,5	Russian Museum	
1		Резной столб в трапезной Петропавловской церкви в селе Пучуге Вологодской губернии	1894	Canvas, oil	29 × 19,6	Tretyakov Gallery	
1		Гора Эльбрус	1897	Canvas, oil	318 × 150	Николаевский художественный музей имени В. В. Верещагина	
1		Гора Казбек	1897	Canvas, oil	287 × 196	Russian Museum	
1		Казбек	1897	Canvas, oil	148 × 74	Львовская галерея искусств	
1		Входная дверь в церковь под Казбеком	1897	Canvas, oil	27 × 16,1	Russian Museum	
1		Крым. Дорога в горах	1880–1901	Canvas, oil	24,5 × 20	Kyiv Art Gallery	
1		Близ Георгиевского монастыря. Крым	конец 1880-х – 1890-е	Canvas, oil	46 × 61	Russian Museum	
1		Закат солнца	конец 1880-х – 1890-е	Canvas, oil	17 × 22,5	Russian Museum	(Note: В списке Лебедева помещено среди этюдов неопределённых серий.)
1		Голова девочки	1880–1901	Canvas, oil	16 × 16	Череповецкое музейное объединение	
1		Река между занесёнными снегом берегами	1880–1901	Canvas on cardboard, oil	14,5 × 26,5	Russian Museum	
1		Сумерки	конец 1880-х – 1890-е	Canvas on cardboard, oil	17 × 22,4	Russian Museum	
1		Москва. Зима	конец 1880-х – 1890-е	Canvas on cardboard, oil	22,2 × 32,2	Russian Museum	
1		Грек	1880–1901	Canvas on cardboard, oil	26,3 × 16,3	Kyiv Art Gallery	
1		Парень в чёрном картузе	1880–1901	Canvas, oil	15 × 15	Kyiv Art Gallery	
1		Старик-дворник	1880–1901	Canvas, oil	16 × 15,5	Kyiv Art Gallery	
1		Женщина в сером платке	1880–1901	Canvas, oil	12,5 × 13,5	Kyiv Art Gallery	

=== Studies and paintings on the theme of the Patriotic War of 1812 and the painting "Good Kums" (1887–1900) ===
#	Painting	Title	Year created	Technique	Dimensions (cm)	Gallery	Notes
1		Перед Москвой в ожидании депутации бояр	1891–1892	Canvas, oil	135 × 109	Музей Отечественной войны 1812 года	
1		В Успенском соборе	1887–1895	Canvas, oil	132 × 112	Музей Отечественной войны 1812 года	
1		В Петровском дворце. В ожидании мира	1895	Canvas, oil	79 × 68	Музей Отечественной войны 1812 года	
1		Возвращение из Петровского дворца	1895	Canvas, oil	87,5 × 135	Национальная картинная галерея Армении	
1		В Городне – пробиваться или отступать?	1887–1895	Canvas, oil	107 × 157	Музей Отечественной войны 1812 года	
1		«Не замай – дай подойти!»	1887–1895	Canvas, oil	198 × 149	Музей Отечественной войны 1812 года	
1		Снег на деревьях в суровую зиму	1887–1895	Canvas, oil	26 × 34,5	Kyiv Art Gallery	
1		«С оружием в руках – расстрелять!»	1887–1895	Canvas, oil	142 × 185	Музей Отечественной войны 1812 года	
1		«В штыки! Ура, ура!» (Атака)	1887–1895	Canvas, oil	200 × 150	Музей Отечественной войны 1812 года	
1		На этапе. Дурные вести из Франции	1887–1895	Canvas, oil	151 × 114	Музей Отечественной войны 1812 года	
1		На большой дороге. Отступление, бегство...	1887–1895	Canvas, oil	179 × 303	Музей Отечественной войны 1812 года	
1		Дорожная карета Наполеона I, взятая при Ватерлоо	1887–1895	Canvas, oil	20,5 × 26,5	Kyiv Art Gallery	
1		Пожар Замоскворечья (Зарево Замоскворечья)	1896–1897	Canvas, oil	59 × 70	Музей Отечественной войны 1812 года	
1		Ночной привал великой армии	1896–1897	Canvas, oil	100 × 120	Музей Отечественной войны 1812 года	
1		Наполеон I на Бородинских высотах	1897	Canvas, oil	107 × 157	Музей Отечественной войны 1812 года	
1		В покоренной Москве (Поджигатели, или Расстрел в Кремле)	1897– 1898	Canvas, oil	86 × 112	Музей Отечественной войны 1812 года	
1		Часть стены и Оружейной башни	1887–1898	Canvas on cardboard, oil	35,5 × 25,8	Kyiv Art Gallery	
1		«В Кремле – пожар!»	1887–1898	Canvas, oil	94,5 × 70	Государственный музей А. С. Пушкина	
1		Конец Бородинского боя	1899–1900	Canvas, oil	165 × 229	Музей Отечественной войны 1812 года	
1		Маршал Даву в Чудовом монастыре	1900	Canvas, oil	127 × 81	Музей Отечественной войны 1812 года	
1		Сквозь пожар	1899–1900	Canvas, oil	84 × 114	Музей Отечественной войны 1812 года	
1		На морозе	1899–1900	Canvas, oil	81 × 64	Музей Отечественной войны 1812 года	
1		Наполеон и маршал Лористон («Мир во что бы то ни стало!»)	1899–1900	Canvas, oil	131 × 146	Музей Отечественной войны 1812 года	
1		Крутицкий терем в Москве	1887–1900	Canvas, oil	25,5 × 17,5	Kyiv Art Gallery	
1		Добрые кумовья	1887–1900	Canvas, oil	59 × 46	Национальный музей искусств Азербайджана	

=== Studies related to a journey to the Philippines and to the paintings on the Spanish-American War of 1898 (1901) ===
#	Painting	Title	Year created	Technique	Dimensions (cm)	Gallery	Notes
1		Море	1901	Canvas on cardboard, oil	14 × 34	Russian Museum	
1		Суэц	1901	Canvas, oil	24 × 15,5	Омский областной музей изобразительных искусств имени М. А. Врубеля	
1		Жилище местных жителей	1901	Canvas on cardboard, oil	12,8 × 12,9	Kyiv Art Gallery	
1		Архипелаг	1901	Canvas on cardboard, oil	13,5 × 15,2	Kyiv Art Gallery	
1		Суэц	1901	Canvas, oil	16 × 33,5	Омский областной музей изобразительных искусств имени М. А. Врубеля	

=== Paintings on the Spanish-American War of 1898 (1901) ===
#	Painting	Title	Year created	Technique	Dimensions (cm)	Gallery	Notes
1		В госпитале	1901	Canvas, oil	100 × 86	Николаевский художественный музей имени В. В. Верещагина	
1		Письмо на родину (Письмо к матери)	1901	Canvas, oil	100 × 88	Ярославский художественный музей	
1		Письмо прервано	1901	Canvas, oil	100 × 86	Николаевский художественный музей имени В. В. Верещагина	
1		Письмо осталось неоконченным	1901	Canvas, oil	100 × 86	Николаевский художественный музей имени В. В. Верещагина	
1		Шпион	1901	Canvas, oil	127 × 102	Львовская галерея искусств	
1		Допрос перебежчика	1901	Canvas, oil	100 × 115	Николаевский художественный музей имени В. В. Верещагина	
1		Раненый	1901	Canvas, oil	100 × 72,5	Kyiv Art Gallery	

=== Studies related to a journey to Cuba and to paintings on the themes of the Spanish-American War of 1898 (1902) ===
#	Painting	Title	Year created	Technique	Dimensions (cm)	Gallery	Notes
1		Взятие Рузвельтом Сан-Жуанских высот	1902	Canvas, oil	34,8 × 26,7	Kyiv Art Gallery	
1		После морского боя. Затопленный испанский флот	1902	Canvas on cardboard, oil	15,4 × 26,5	Kyiv Art Gallery	
1		Пальма	1902	Canvas on cardboard, oil	10,3 × 34,5	Kyiv Art Gallery	
1		Крепость Сант-Яго	1902	Canvas, oil	25 × 15 (в свету)	Таганрогский художественный музей	

=== Studies and paintings related to a journey to Japan (1903) ===
#	Painting	Title	Year created	Technique	Dimensions (cm)	Gallery	Notes
1		Шинтоистский храм в Никко	1903	Canvas, oil	45 × 61	Russian Museum	
1		Храм в Никко	1903	Canvas, oil	45,5 × 60	Новгородский музей-заповедник	
1		Вход в храм Никко	1903	Canvas, oil	46 × 61	Russian Museum	
1		На мосту	1903	Canvas, oil	27 × 33	Russian Museum	
1		Лодка	1903	Canvas, oil	25 × 34,5	Нижегородский государственный художественный музей	
1		При храме	1903	Canvas, oil	45,5 × 59,5	Russian Museum	
1		Буддийский храм в Токио	1903	Canvas, oil	45,5 × 52	Новгородский музей-заповедник	
1		Храм в Токио	1903	Canvas, oil	33,5 × 27,5	Псковский музей-заповедник	
1		Японский домик	1903	Canvas, oil	28 × 36	Самарский областной художественный музей	
1		Вход в храм в Киото	1903	Canvas, oil	36 × 28	Череповецкое музейное объединение	
1		Японка	1903	Canvas, oil	75 × 51	Севастопольский художественный музей имени М. П. Крошицкого	
1		Японка	1903	Canvas, oil	36 × 15	Russian Museum	
1		Японский священник	1903	Canvas, oil	41 × 29	Russian Museum	
1		Японский нищий	1903	Canvas, oil	50,5 × 27,5	Russian Museum	
1		В парке	1903	Canvas, oil	25 × 33	Russian Museum	
1		Прогулка в лодке	1903	Canvas, oil	70 × 103,5	Russian Museum	Не окончена.
1		На прогулке	1903	Canvas, oil	72 × 100,5	Национальный музей искусств Азербайджана	Не окончена.

=== Studies outside series ===
#	Painting	Title	Year created	Technique	Dimensions (cm)	Gallery	Notes
1		Зимний вечер. У ворот		Canvas, oil	11,5 × 16	Kyiv Art Gallery	
1		Венеция ночью		Canvas, oil	20 × 25,5	Kyiv Art Gallery	
1		Храм бога войны		Canvas, oil	37,8 × 23,4	Radishchev Art Museum	
1		Туркмен		Canvas, oil	27,5 × 14,5	Национальный художественный музей Республики Беларусь	
1		Этюд		Canvas, oil	17 × 27	Художественная культура Русского Севера	
1		Закат над снежным полем		Canvas on cardboard, oil	13 × 24,6	Kyiv Art Gallery	
1		Араб на верблюде		Wood, oil	25 × 20	Северо-Осетинский государственный художественный музей имени М. С. Туганова	
1		Базар	1870-е	Cardboard, oil	47,5 × 67,5	Национальный музей в Варшаве	
1		Монахи у дверей мечети	1870-е	Cardboard, oil	61 × 49,2	Музей изящных искусств (Бостон)	
1		Снежные горы		Canvas, oil	43,3 × 32,7	Атенеум (Хельсинки)	

== Literature ==
- Brook, Yakob V.; Iovleva, Lidia I., eds. (2001). Государственная Третьяковская галерея – каталог собрания [State Tretyakov Gallery – collection catalog] (in Russian). Vol. 4: Painting of the second half of the 19th century, book 1, A–M. Moscow: Red Square. ISBN 5-900743-56-X.
- Goldovsky, G. N.; Lenyashin, V. A., eds. (2014). Russian Museum – collection catalog (in Russian). Vol. 5: Painting of the second half of the 19th century (A–I). Saint Petersburg: Palace Editions. ISBN 978-5-93332-507-9.
- Lebedev, А.К. (1958). Василий Васильевич Верещагин: Жизнь и творчество [Vasily Vasilyevich Vereshchagin: Life and Work] (in Russian). Moscow: Iskusstvo.
