= Blowing from Guns in British India =

Painting by Vasily Vereshchagin

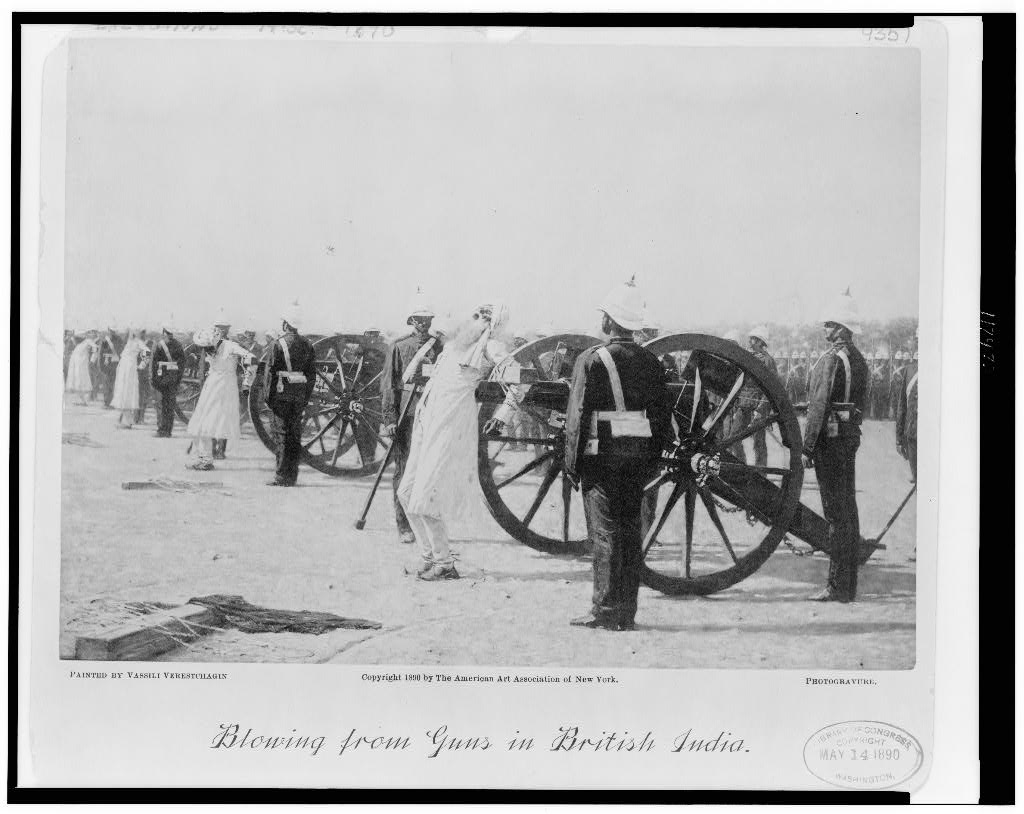
- Black and White photogravure of Blowing from Guns in British India. The status of the original color painting is unknown, and it was possibly destroyed by water damage circa 1950.
- Artist: Vasily Vereshchagin
- Year: c. 1884
- Medium: Oil on canvas
- Subject: Execution of Namdhari Sikhs in 1872
- Location: unknown

Blowing from Guns in British India, sometimes shortened to Blowing from Guns, was a painting (presumed destroyed) by the Russian artist Vasily Vereshchagin. The painting depicts the execution of Namdhari Sikhs by being "blown from a gun" in January, 1872. A work of Orientalist art, the painting was produced by Vereshchagin as part of a trilogy of works depicting capital punishment, titled Eye for Eye, Tooth for Tooth.

When the work was exhibited in the 1880s, audiences mistakenly believed that it showed sepoys being executed in the aftermath of the Indian Rebellion of 1857. This misconception persists; Vereshchagin never corrected the mistake, while some period newspapers correctly identified the subject matter. Vereshchagin's English-language exhibition catalogs referred to the painting as Blowing from Guns in British India, but it is now misleadingly known as Suppression of the Indian Revolt by the English.

== History ==
=== Background ===
Russian artist Vasily Vereshchagin painted Blowing from Guns in British India in 1884, after his second trip to British India in 1882. A proponent of Realism and Orientalism in art, Vereshchagin had extensive experience in painting Orientalist scenes for Western and Russian audiences; though his work contained many realist aspects, it also presented life in the Asia as exaggeratedly exotic, and Vereshchagin supported the imperial expansion of European powers into Asia. Having already visited the Holy Land in the same trip and been inspired by its history, Vereshchagin began to consider producing a series of paintings depicting various forms of executions. One such method of execution was being "blown from a gun" in which the condemned was tied to the muzzle of a cannon and violently dismembered when the cannon was fired.

=== Subject material ===
Blowing from a gun was notably used during the suppression of the Indian Rebellion of 1857, with such executions being depicted in several British illustrations depicting the 1857 rebellion. This method was used again in 1872, two years prior to Vereshchagin's first visit to India. At that time, Deputy-Commissioner J. L. Cowan executed a group of Namdhari Sikhs after they attacked Malodh fort and slaughterhouse in Malerkotla. A number of captured Namdhari were executed by the British without trial, causing a widespread but ultimately short episode of coverage in the British press. Vereshchagin may have learnt of this incident while traveling in India, or he might have read about it in the Russian press. The artist would eventually claim to have witnessed executions carried out in a similar fashion, though this has been disproven by academic sources.

Amid heightened imperial tensions of the Great Game between the British and Russian empires, Vereshchagin used the painting to explore the brutality of the British colonial presence in India, which he and many Russians considered harsher than Russia's own imperial expansion into Central Asia.

After his return to Europe and his subsequent painting of three execution scenes (referred to in his exhibition catalogs as "Eye for Eye, Tooth for Tooth"), Vereshchagin took his paintings on tour in Britain and the United States. While Blowing from Guns was well-received in the United States, the painting was controversial with the British public and was extensively criticized by the press.

Vereshchagin's "Blowing from Guns in British India" on the wall of Mark Hopkins Institute of Art (now San Francisco Art Institute)

Following the painting's tour of America, it was purchased at a New York auction by the art collector and dealer H. T. Chapman. Chapman then sold the work to Phoebe A. Hearst, who donated it to the Museum of Anthropology in San Francisco. It was then transferred to UC Berkeley for storage, where it appears to have been destroyed by water damage ca. 1950. Another popular misconception about the work is that the painting was bought and destroyed by the British government to prevent further negative publicity about imperial violence. In some versions this destruction was wrought by shooting the painting itself with cannons.

== Description ==
Vereshchagin, a famous war artist known for his realism, painted Blowing from Guns in British India in 1884. The work depicts a real event from 1872, when Deputy-Commissioner J. L. Cowan executed a group of Namdhari Sikhs at the parade grounds in Malerkotla. During his 1882 trip Vereshchagin created a study for "Blowing from Guns", now conserved at the Russian Museum, which shows that the soldiers are dressed in uniforms contemporary to that time and are using more modern cannons. When Blowing from Guns was displayed in London at the Grosvenor Gallery, many audiences mistakenly assumed it showed one of the executions of Sepoys that took place after the Indian Rebellion of 1857. Critics accordingly mocked the work for showing soldiers in modern uniforms with modern cannons, rather than elements appropriate to 1857. The painting was part of Vereshchagin's trilogy on capital punishment known as ""Eye for Eye, Tooth for Tooth", which also included the works Execution of Conspirators in Russia and Crucifixion by the Romans.

== See also ==
- List of paintings by Vasily Vereshchagin
