= The Apotheosis of War =

1871 painting by Vasily Vereshchagin

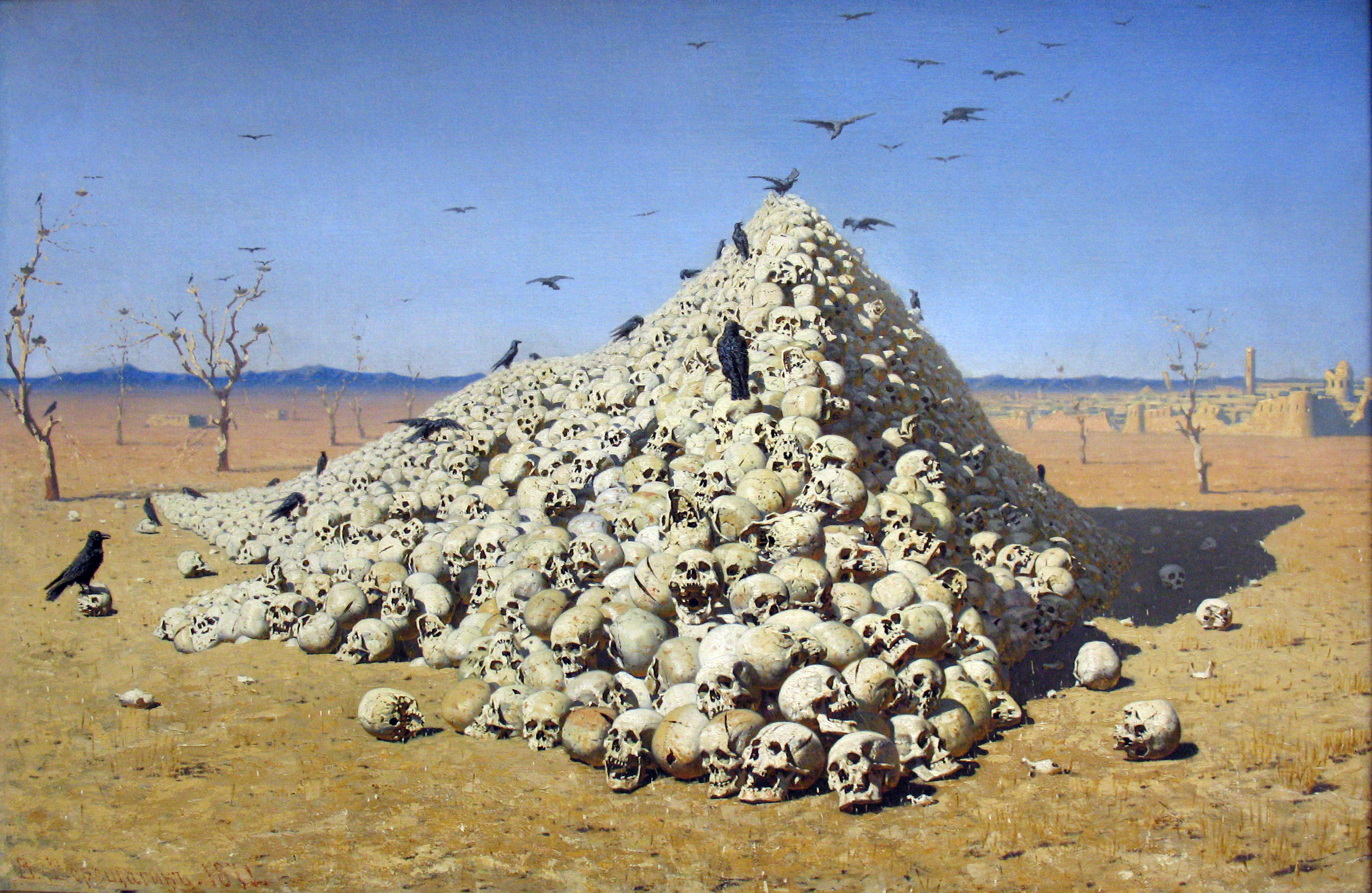
- Artist: Vasily Vereshchagin
- Year: 1871
- Medium: Oil on canvas
- Dimensions: 127 cm × 197 cm (50 in × 78 in)
- Location: Tretyakov Gallery, Moscow

The Apotheosis of War (Russian: Апофеоз войны) is an 1871 painting by Russian war artist Vasily Vereshchagin. Following his completion of the painting, Vereshchagin dedicated his work "to all great conquerors, past, present and to come". Done in oil on canvas, the painting depicts a pile of skulls outside the walls of a city in Central Asia. It is considered part of Vereshchagin's Turkestan Series.

The painting is now displayed in the Tretyakov Gallery, in Moscow.

== History ==
=== Background ===
The Apotheosis of War was painted by Vereshchagin in 1871. At the time, Vereshchagin was residing in Munich, Germany, where he painted 13 works (including Apotheosis) of art depicting his earlier travelling with the Imperial Russian Army as it moved throughout Central Asia, fighting against various factions and conquering what would become Russian Turkestan. As a classically trained war artist, many of Vereshchagin's works were centered around battle scenes between the Russian army and the forces of the Khanates of Khiva and Kokand.

=== Description ===
Apotheosis depicts a pile of human skulls set on the barren earth, the aftermath of a battle or siege. A flock of carrion birds are seen to be occupied with picking over the pile; some birds have already landed, while others are flying in or roosting in nearby trees. The ground below them is a sallow, earthy yellow covered with grass, complementing the dirty ivory color of the partially-bleached skulls. The shadow cast by the mound, coupled with the many black orifices created by empty jaws and eye-sockets, adds a sense of depth to the painting, further exacerbating the scale of the deathly pile.

A range of mountains serves as a dividing line for the painting, separating the vastness of the steppes from the emptiness of the sky, while the city of Samarkand can be seen in the far right of the painting. The city's walls have visibly been breached, a reference to the Siege of Samarkand in the summer of 1868 in which the Russian garrison repulsed a Bukharid attack. On the work's frame, Vereshchagin inscribed that he dedicated the painting "to all great conquerors, past, present and to come".

=== Reception ===
Vereshchagin exhibited his art at a number of venues in the 1870s and 1880s. While his more traditional work was well received, two of his works from the campaign generated considerable controversy. Specifically, The Apotheosis of War and Left Behind were considered to be profoundly anti-war and seen by some as portraying the Russian army in a bad light; this resulted in the Russian government preventing the two paintings from being shown at Vereshchagin's exhibitions in Russia. The artist experienced a similar backlash when he exhibited his work in Germany, notably when Apotheosis was viewed by German field marshal Helmuth von Moltke the Elder. In a widely cited event, the painting provoked a confused, startled reaction from Moltke, who ordered that German soldiers be barred from seeing the painting. This order was seconded by the Minister of War of the Austrian Empire, who issued a similar ban.

Vereshchagin was unconcerned with the viewership bans on his paintings, but was concerned with the growing number of accusations within Russia that he was slandering the Russian army. In response, the artist destroyed three of his lesser-known paintings. Despite the controversy surrounding some of his work, Vereshchagin continued painting battles and their aftermaths until his death during the Russo-Japanese War.

== See also ==
- List of paintings by Vasily Vereshchagin
