= Zindan, Iran =

Zindan زيندان
- Village
- Location within Iran
- Coordinates: 25°45′00″N 61°25′00″E
- Country: Iran
- Province: Sistan and Baluchestan
- County: Chabahar
- Bakhsh: Dashtiari
- Rural District: Bahu Kalat

Population (2006)
  - Total: 201
- Time zone: UTC+3:30 (IRST)
  - Summer (DST): UTC+4:30 (IRDT)

Zindan (Persian: زيندان, also Romanized as Zīndān) is a village in Bahu Kalat Rural District, Dashtiari District, Chabahar County, Sistan and Baluchestan Province, Iran. At the 2006 census, its population was 201, in 45 families.
