= Zendan Castle =

Castle in Bushehr Province, Iran

- قلعه زندان
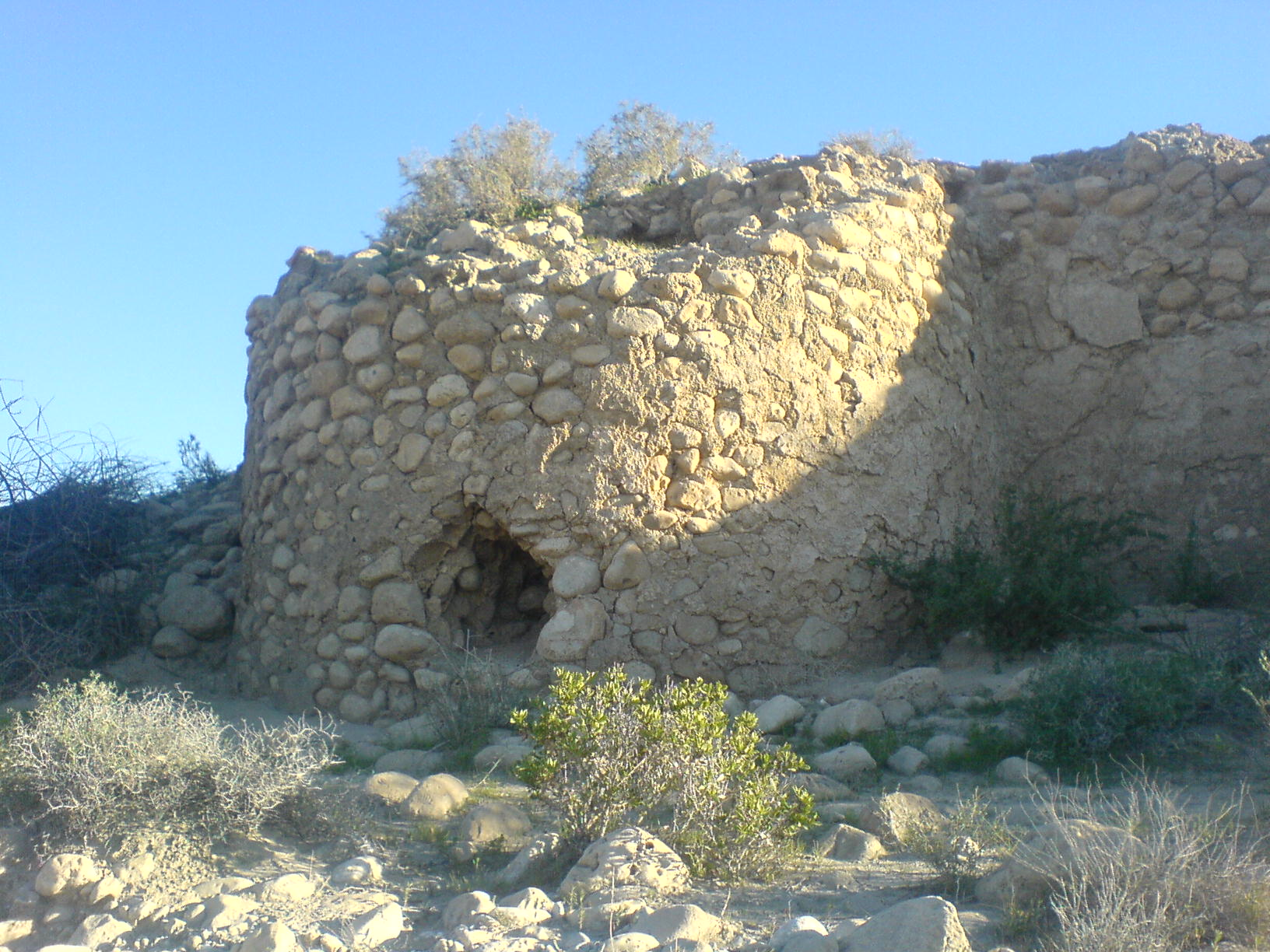

- Location within Iran

General information
- Type: Castle
- Location: Deyr County, Iran
- Coordinates: 28.103333°N 51.522111°E

Zendan Castle (Persian: قلعه زندان) is a historical castle located in Deyr County in Bushehr Province, Iran. The longevity of this fortress dates back to the Sasanian Empire.
