= Zandan Tower =

Coordinates: 41°01′40″N 21°19′35″E

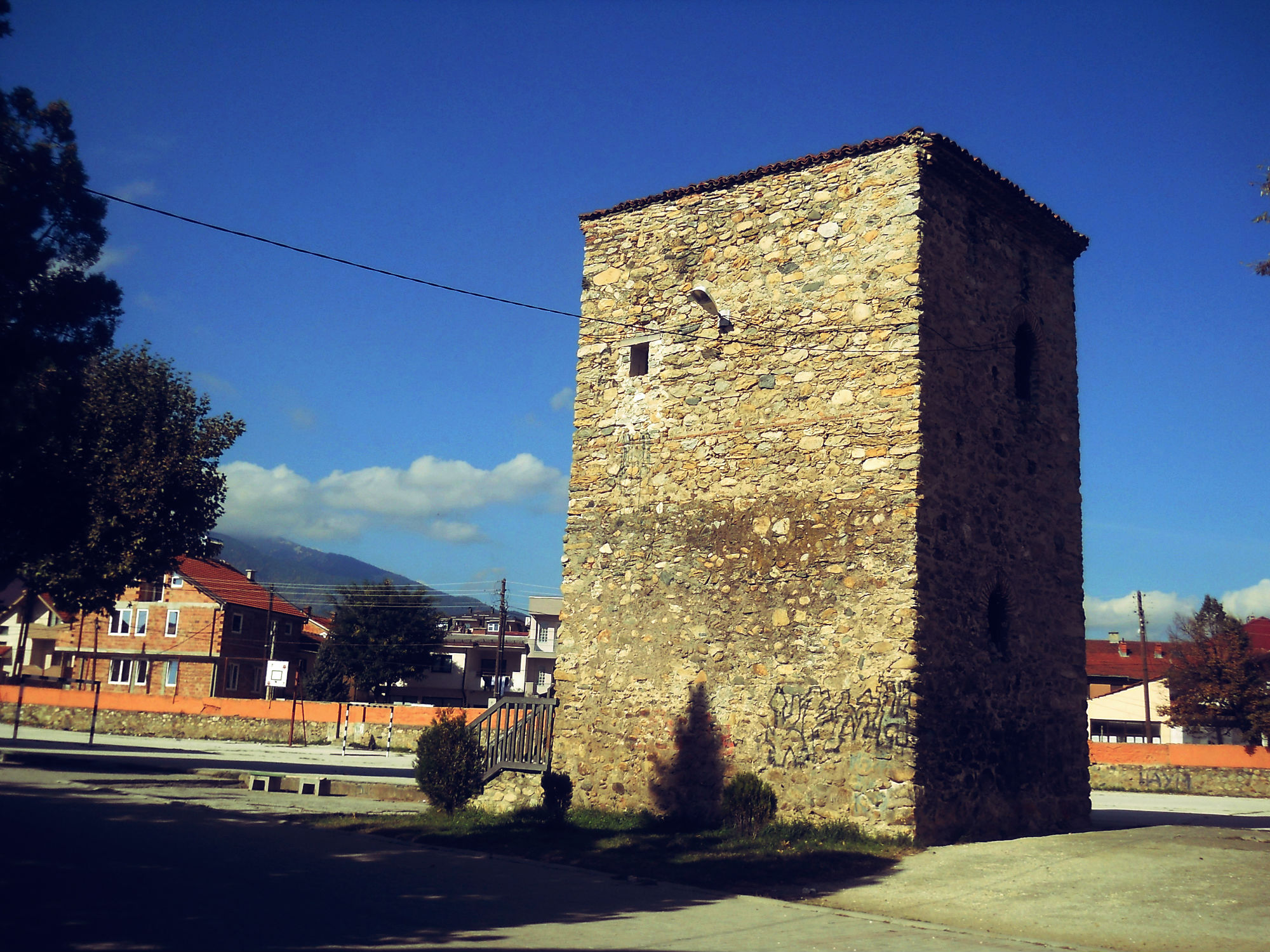
Zandan Tower

Zandan Tower (Macedonian: Зандан куле, romanized: Zandan kule) is a former Ottoman defensive and prison tower in Bitola, North Macedonia. It was built in the early 17th century by Haci Mahmud Efendi, the mufti of Bitola, on a private homestead next to a multi-family housing block in which Turkish and Albanian residents lived. It is accessed via a staircase leading up to the double door made of thick oak wood on the tower's south façade. Standing 10.95 m (35.9 ft) in height, its exterior walls are all roughly 1 m (3.3 ft) thick or greater. The interior is made up of three stories, with the upper floor setup as a dwelling.

The tower is connected with the Nakşbendi order of Sufism. Its builder, also known as Hırka Baba, lived a secluded spiritual life with his family on this homestead. It became a place of pilgrimage for a period after his death in 1628. During the Ilinden Uprising of 1903, the tower was used as a prison for rebels, from whence the tower gets its present name (zandan meaning dungeon in Macedonian).

Today, Zandan Tower is within the yard of the school "Stefan Naumov". It is listed as an Object of Cultural Heritage by the Ministry of Culture.

== See also ==
- Clock tower (Kratovo)
- Kočani medieval towers
