= Police Band of the Ministry of Interior of Republika Srpska =

- Полицијски оркестар Министарства унутрашњих послова Републике Српске
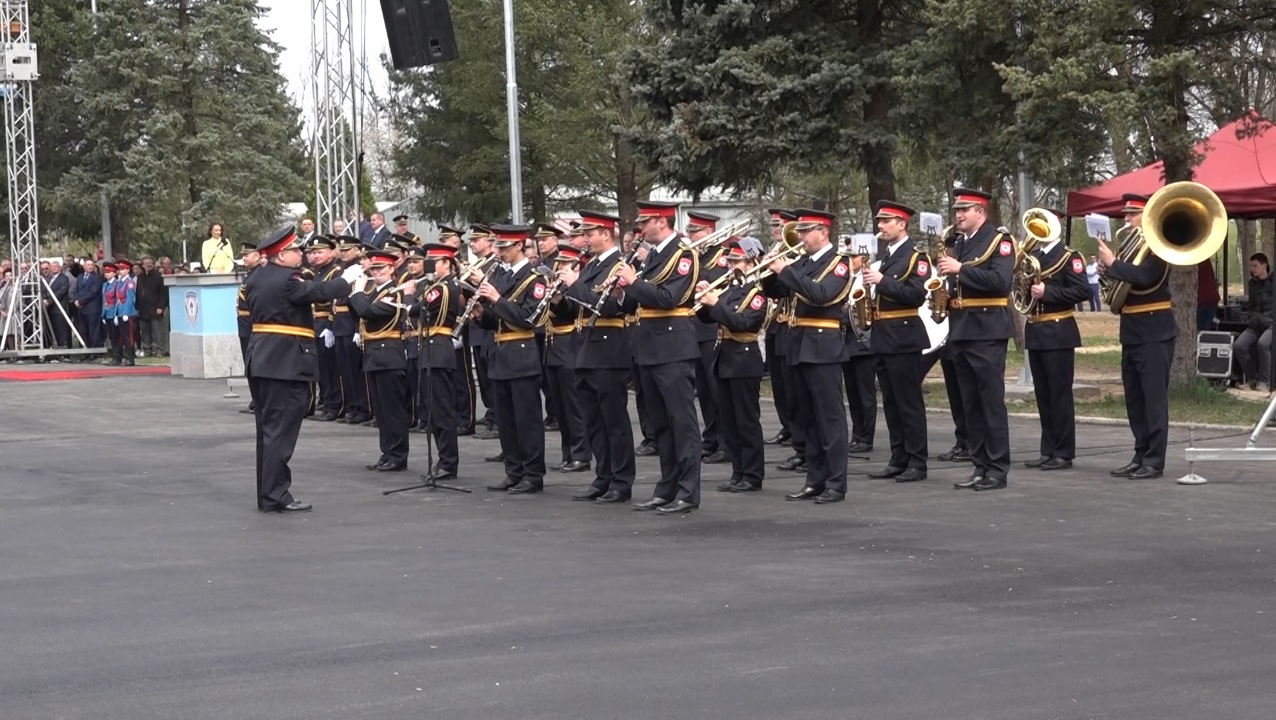
- Active: December 2017 – present
- Country: Republika Srpska
- Branch: Ministry of Interior of Republika Srpska
- Type: Police band

Commanders
- Director of Music: Jelena Atlagić
- Conductor: Dušan Pokrajčić

The Police Band of the Ministry of Interior of Republika Srpska (Serbian: Полицијски оркестар Министарства унутрашњих послова Републике Српске, Policijski orkestar Ministarstva unutrašnjih poslova Republike Srpske) is ceremonial orchestral unit of the Ministry of Interior of Republika Srpska.

It is considered a national symbol of Police and Republika Srpska and it a is new formed Police unit. Also, the role of the band is to celebrate days that are significant to Republika Srpska or the Ministry of Interior. The band's first appearance was on January 9, 2018 on celebration of Republic Day together with the Honour Unit of Ministry of Interior in new ceremonial uniforms.

The band is made up of 20 professional musicians that play on many different music instruments: trumpet, trombone, tuba, french horn, flute, clarinet and alt saxophone.

== Concerts, repertoire and premieres ==
The young band, within just days of its foundation, began its presence to the public when it staged just few concerts and appearances in Republika Srpska and first concert was in Banja Luka on November 21, 2018 on celebration of the slava of Ministry of Interior. Its first-ever appearance outside Republika Srpska was in Vienna on January 25, 2019. After their first successful concert in Banja Luka, they had mini-tour in cities seats of police administrations in Republika Srpska: Prijedor (March 4), East Sarajevo (March 31), Bijeljina (May 11, together with Art ensemble of the Ministry of Defence of Serbia), Doboj (June 25) and Trebinje (August 18th).

They usually play Serbian marching music, patriotic songs ("Tamo daleko", "Kreće se lađa francuska, and "Pukni zoro") and arrangements of modern and movie music.

Beside their standard repertoire they had for first time played Anthem of Ministry of Interior of Republika Srpska composed by conductor Dušan Pokrajčić. Also, Police Band participates in celebration of the Fête de la Musique in Banja Luka. In 2019 Police Band participated to celebration of International Jazz Day when the band played Banja Luka written by Phill Woods, played first time by Quincy Jones in 1961 and arranged for the Police Band by band's conductor.

=== First concert in Banja Luka ===
First concert of the Police Band was in Cultural Center Banski Dvor on November 21, 2018. Reason for the concert was slava of the Ministry of Interior of Republika Srpska Saint Archangel Michael. On concert were also short video clips from the history of the Police and the Ministry of Interior of Republika Srpska and short movie about first year of work of the Police Band produced by Radio Television of Republika Srpska. On first concert in Banja Luka, Police Band played this compositions: Moja Republika (National anthem of Republika Srpska), Bože pravde (National anthem of Serbia), marches National Heroes, Radetzky March, Miloš the Great, Alexander I, March on the Drina, patriotic songs, Kreće se lađa francuska, Tamo daleko, music from the movie Povratak otpisanih, The Final Countown, Devojko mala, Dancing Queen, Uptown Funk and Pukni zoro sung by alt saxophonist Srđan Vasić.

== See also ==
- Honour Unit (Republika Srpska)
- Police of Republika Srpska
- Ministry of Interior (Republika Srpska)
