= Great Retreat (Serbia) =

Military retreat of the Serbian army during the winter of 1915–16

- Part of the Second Serbian campaign of World War I
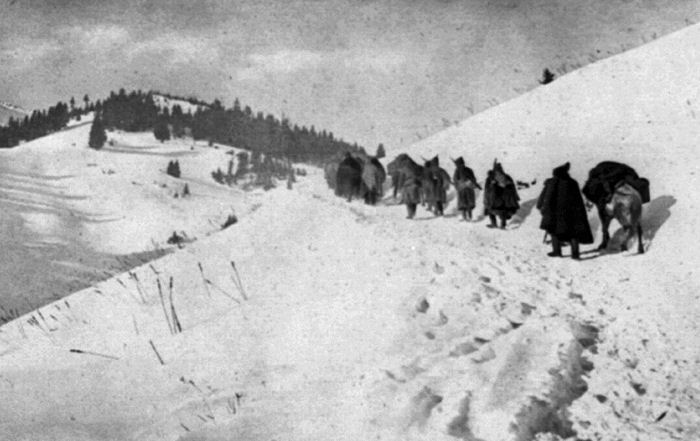
- Serbian soldiers and pack animals crossing the Rugova Canyon near Peja during the Great Retreat.
- Operational scope: Strategic withdrawal
- Type: Retreat
- Location: Kingdom of Serbia, the Principality of Albania, and the Kingdom of Montenegro, leading to the Adriatic Sea; 42°22′56.69″N 19°58′51.29″E
- Planned: Serbian Army High Command
- Commanded by: Field Marshal Radomir Putnik
- Objective: Retreat to the Adriatic Sea for evacuation
- Date: 25 November 1915 – 18 January 1916
- Executed by: Royal Serbian Army; Accompanied by civilian refugees and Austro-Hungarian prisoners of war
- Outcome: Serbian forces and refugees evacuated to Corfu
- Casualties: Serbian soldiers: 77,455 dead; 77,278 missing; Serbian civilians: 160,000 dead; Austro-Hungarian POWs: 47,000 dead

The Great Retreat was the retreat of the Royal Serbian Army through the mountains of Albania during the winter of 1915–16 in World War I. In Serbian memory and historical discourse, the event is often described as the Albanian Golgotha (Serbian: Албанска голгота, romanized: Albanska golgota) or Serbian Golgotha (Serbian: Српска голгота, romanized: Srpska golgota), due to the large number of casualties and hardships experienced by the retreating Serbian soldiers and civilians. It is considered to be a defining event in Serbian history.

In late October 1915, Germany, Austria-Hungary and Bulgaria launched a synchronised major offensive, under German leadership, against Serbia. Earlier that month, France and Britain landed four divisions at Salonika, under the commands of General Maurice Sarrail and General Sir Byron Mahon, to assist their outnumbered Serbian ally caught between the invading forces. The Royal Serbian Army fought while retreating southwards with the plan to withdraw into Macedonia and link up with Entente forces. After the defection of Greece, Bulgarian forces halted the Franco-British relief force in the Vardar Valley. The Serbs were eventually pushed into the plain of Kosovo by the converging Austro-Hungarian, German, and Bulgarian columns.

To escape encirclement, on 23 November 1915, the Serbian government and supreme command made the joint decision to retreat across the mountains of Montenegro and Albania. The objective was to reach the Adriatic coast, where the Serbian Army could reorganise and reequip with Allied assistance. The retreat involved the remnants of the army, King Peter I, hundreds of thousands of civilian refugees, and prisoners of war. Between November 1915 and January 1916, during the journey across the mountains, 77,455 soldiers, 47,000 prisoners of war and 160,000 civilians froze, starved to death, died of disease, or were killed by enemy raids. Austrian pilots used the new technology of the time, dropping bombs on the retreating columns in what has been described as 'the first aerial bombardment of civilians'.

The Serbian retreat is considered one of the most devastating in modern military history, with immense human and strategic consequences. Of the 400,000 people who set out on the journey, only 120,000 soldiers and 60,000 civilians reached the Adriatic coast, where they were evacuated by Allied ships to the island of Corfu. There, a Serbian government-in-exile was established, headed by Prince-Regent Alexander and Nikola Pašić. A further 11,000 Serbs would later die from disease, malnutrition, or exposure sustained during the retreat. The Serbian Army would later contribute to Allied efforts on the Salonica front, playing a key role in the liberation of Serbia.

== Background ==
=== First Serbian campaign ===
On 28 July 1914, a month after the assassination of Austrian Archduke Franz Ferdinand, Austria-Hungary, the second-largest country in Europe, declared war on Serbia, marking the beginning of the First World War. The conflict began on the night of 28–29 July with the Austro-Hungarian bombardment of Belgrade. On 12 August, Austro-Hungarian forces under General Oskar Potiorek launched their first offensive into Serbia. The Balkanstreitkräfte, a force intended for the invasion of Serbia and Montenegro consisting of the 5th Army and 6th Army, began operations with the 5th Army advancing south-east via the upper Drina River.

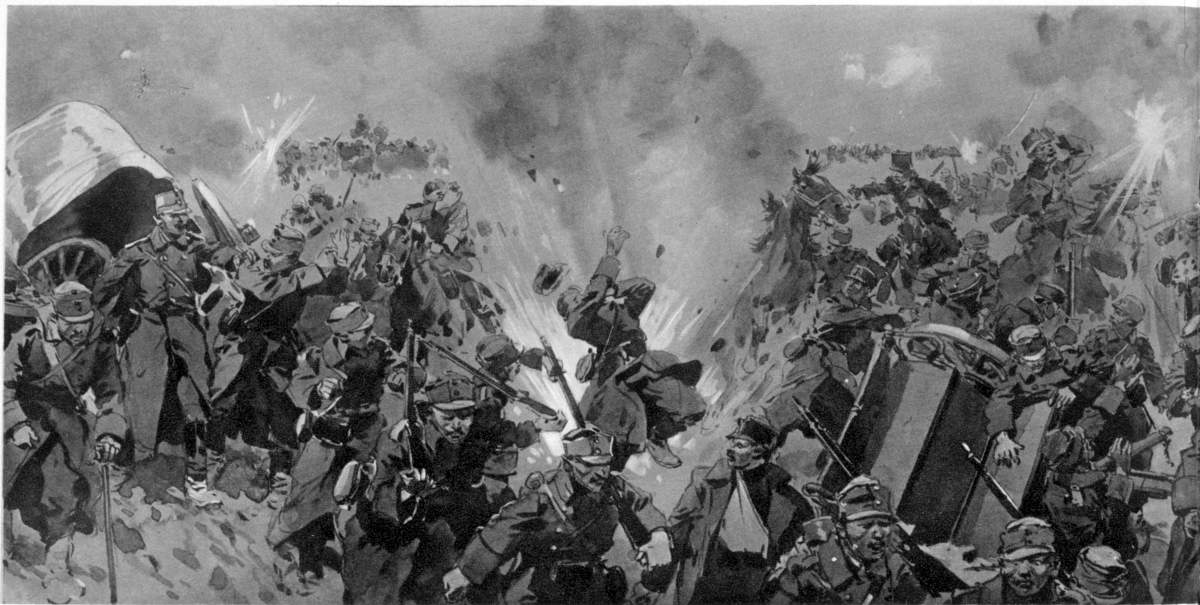
The "Austrian debacle" in The Illustrated War News of 30 December 1914

Despite initial setbacks, the Serbian Army, under General Radomir Putnik, used the mountainous terrain and defence strategy to achieve a decisive victory at the Battle of Cer on 17 August. Serbia became the first Allied nation to secure a victory in the First World War, forcing all Austro-Hungarian forces to retreat from Serbian territory less than two weeks after the first offensive. The historic defeat dealt an incalculable blow to Habsburg prestige. Following the initial failure, Austria-Hungary regrouped and launched a second invasion in September 1914. In the Battle of the Drina, the Serbian Army repelled the 5th Army, forcing them to retreat but the Austro-Hungarian forces retained a foothold in Serbian territory, from which they would launch a third offensive.

The third invasion, launched in October 1914, led to the capture of Belgrade on 2 December 1914 before a successful Serbian counter-offensive at the Battle of Kolubara forced the Central Powers to retreat from Serbia by the end of the month, concluding the campaign. General Potiorek was dismissed from command on 22 December along with 5th Army commander Liborius Ritter von Frank. In response to repeated setbacks and rising frustration among Austro-Hungarian forces, elements of the Austro-Hungarian Army committed war crimes against Serbian civilians, including executions, mass deportations, and burning of villages.

=== Second Serbian campaign ===
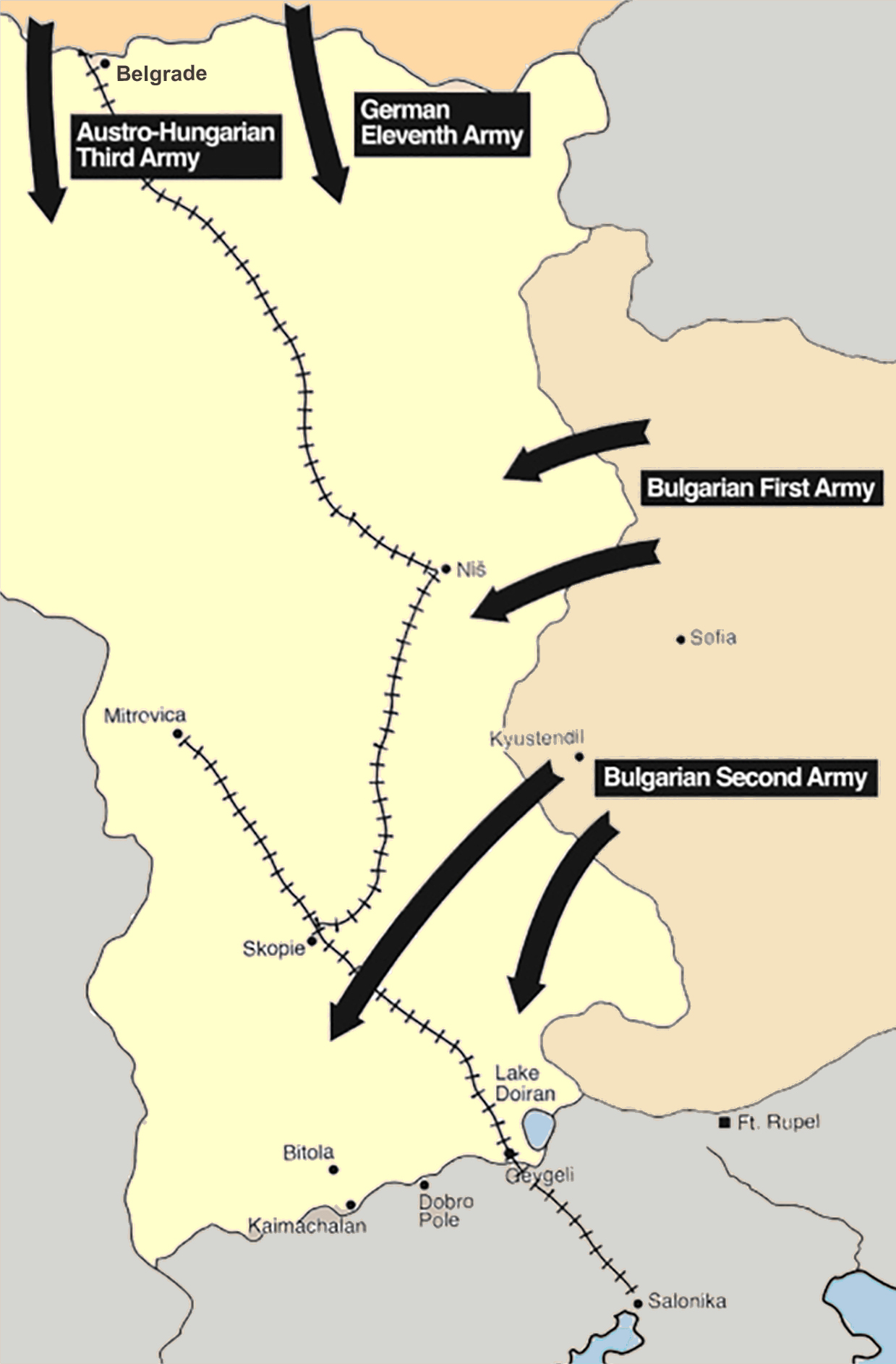
Central Powers' invasion of Serbia, October 1915, showing the coordinated offensives of the Austro-Hungarian, German, and Bulgarian armies

In early 1915, the German Chief of the General Staff, Erich von Falkenhayn, persuaded the Austro-Hungarian Chief of Staff, Franz Conrad von Hötzendorf, to launch a renewed invasion of Serbia. This effort gained further momentum in September 1915 when Bulgaria formally aligned itself with the Central Powers, signing a treaty with Germany and mobilising its forces. The offensive began on 6 October 1915, as German and Austro-Hungarian forces, commanded by Field Marshal August von Mackensen, launched a large-scale attack on Serbia from the north and west. Their strategy aimed to pin down the bulk of the Serbian Army along the Sava and Danube Rivers, preventing them from responding effectively to further attacks.

On 11 October, without a formal declaration of war, the Bulgarian Army began its advance, launching attacks on Serbian border positions. Three days later, on 14 October, Bulgaria officially declared war on Serbia. Its First Army under General Kliment Boyadzhiev, advanced on Niš in order to link with German Eleventh Army. The Bulgarian Second Army under General Georgi Todorov was to proceed into Macedonia, with the objective of severing the Salonika railway, which ran through the Vardar and Great Morava River valleys, cutting off Serbia’s reinforcements and artillery supplies. Bulgarian forces overwhelmed Serbia’s thinly spread border defences while Serbian troops were locked in heavy combat against German and Austro-Hungarian forces advancing from the north. At the same time, additional Austrian troops advanced from the west, further stretching Serbian defensive lines.

By 6 November, the Bulgarian First Army had linked up with General Max von Gallwitz’s Eleventh German Army near Niš. On 10 November, Bulgarian forces crossed the Southern Morava 29 kilometres (18 mi) south of Niš, and launched an attack on the Serbian Army. Although significantly outnumbered, Serbian forces managed to hold Prokuplje for two days before being forced to retreat. With Austro-Hungarian, German, and Bulgarian forces advancing from the north and the Bulgarian Second Army pressing from the east, the Serbian Army, lacking any defensible positions, was forced to retreat south-west into the territory of Kosovo.

== Prelude ==
=== Kosovo offensive, 10–24 November ===
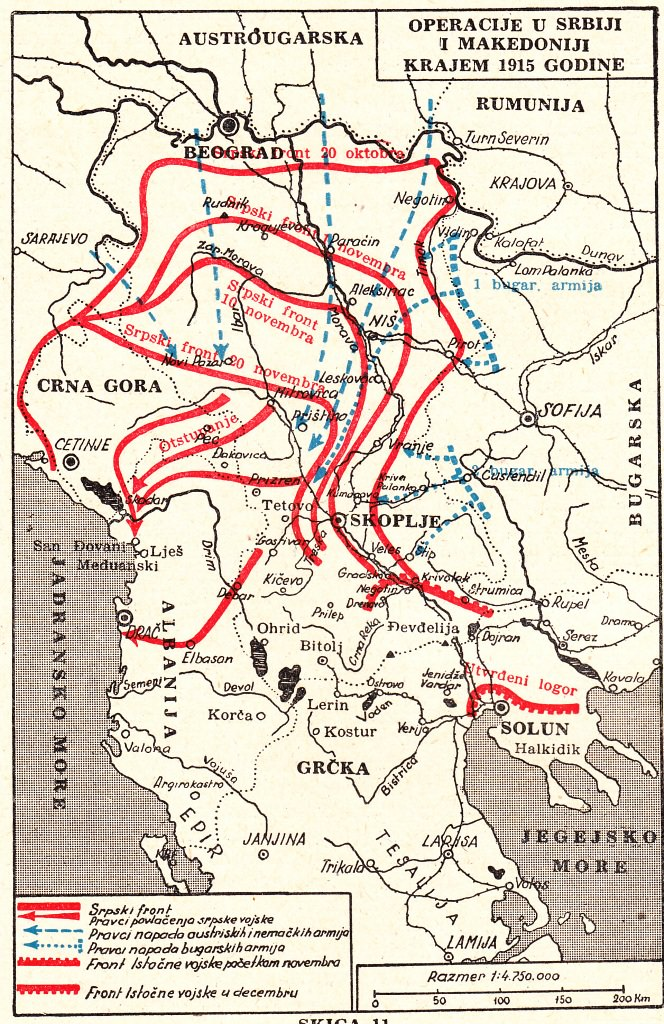
Military operations in Serbia and Macedonia during the Kosovo Offensive (10–24 November 1915), showing frontlines, advances, and withdrawals

Approximately 300,000 Serbian soldiers and between 50,000 and 60,000 refugees found themselves gathered in Kosovo, the last defensible area before a possible retreat. The region held deep symbolic significance for Serbian national identity, and many saw the moment as part of a broader historical cycle, recalling the 1389 Battle of Kosovo, the 1813 collapse of the First Serbian Uprising, and the recent victories of the Balkan Wars in 1912 and 1913 respectively.

By mid-November, Serbian forces had reached Pristina ahead of their pursuers but were unable to break south due to the Bulgarian Second Army's blockade at Kaçanik Gorge. This prevented a link-up with French forces under General Maurice Sarrail in Salonika. The Central Powers, led by Field Marshal August von Mackensen, aimed to trap the Serbian Army in Kosovo and force a final, decisive battle. The severing of the Niš–Skopje–Salonika railway further isolated Serbia from its allies, worsening the situation. Field Marshal Putnik attempted to concentrate his forces at Kosovo field, but Serbian defences were rapidly deteriorating.

As Serbian forces retreated, the Austro-Hungarian Luftfahrtruppen, that until then provided air support to the Austro-Hungarian Army and communications between the German Eleventh and Bulgarian First Armies, began bombing both military positions and civilian refugee columns, marking one of the first recorded cases of aerial bombardment against civilians. Albanian armed groups launched guerrilla attacks on isolated Serbian detachments, seeking revenge for past Serbian military actions in Kosovo after its annexation in 1913. The entire Bulgarian Army, supported from the north by parts of the Eleventh German Army, now advanced against the Serbs.

On 23 November, following intense fighting, the Serbian lines collapsed. Pristina and Mitrovica fell to the Central Powers, and the Serbian government abandoned Prizren, its last wartime capital in Serbia. The Serbian Army, now reduced to around 220,000 soldiers and accompanied by 80,000 refugees, had little choice but to retreat toward Montenegro and Albania.

The Serbian leadership considered three options: capitulation and a separate peace, a final defensive battle, or retreat. While a counteroffensive was briefly discussed, the decision was made to withdraw rather than surrender. The only available route for retreat led south-west and north-west, across the Korab and Accursed Mountains mountain ranges in Albania and Montenegro, part of the Dinaric Alps, where elevations exceeded 6,000 feet (1,800 m) and harsh winter conditions had already set in. The Serbian government, led by Prime Minister Nikola Pašić, Prince Regent Alexander, and the Supreme Command under Field Marshal Radomir Putnik, ordered a general withdrawal. The plan was to regroup in exile, reorganise the army, and continue the war with Allied support.

=== Order of retreat, 25 November ===
With no remaining strongholds, the Serbian High Command issued an official retreat order on 25 November 1915, instructing all units to withdraw toward the Adriatic coast. To prevent capture, artillery, vehicles, and supplies were either abandoned, destroyed, or thrown into ravines. Some weapons were buried, while government documents were either hidden or burned. King Peter I noted in his diary that soldiers resorted to burning official records to keep warm in the freezing conditions.

Putnik issued an order requiring 36,000 boys between the ages of twelve and eighteen to accompany the army during the retreat. The decision was made to prevent them from being captured by enemy forces and to ensure the preservation of future military manpower for Serbia. On 25 November 1915, the Serbian High Command issued an official order of retreat to all army commanders, directing the withdrawal of Serbian forces:

The only way out of this grave situation is a retreat to the Adriatic coast. There our army will be reorganised, furnished with food, arms, munitions, clothing, and all other necessities which our allies will send us, and we shall again be a fact with which our allies must reckon. The nation has not lost its being, it will continue to exist even though on foreign soil, so long as the ruler, the government and the army are there, no matter what the strength of the army may be.

— Serbian High Command, 25 November 1915,

== Retreat ==
The Serbian Army split into three columns, moving toward the rugged terrains of Albania and Montenegro, to reach the Adriatic coast, pursued by the Austro-Hungarian Tenth Mountain Brigade and the German Alpine Corps. King Peter I, despite his advanced age and frail health, insisted on accompanying the retreating army, traveling through the rugged terrain in an ox cart. His presence served as a morale boost for the exhausted troops, as he had symbolically resumed leadership during the crisis.

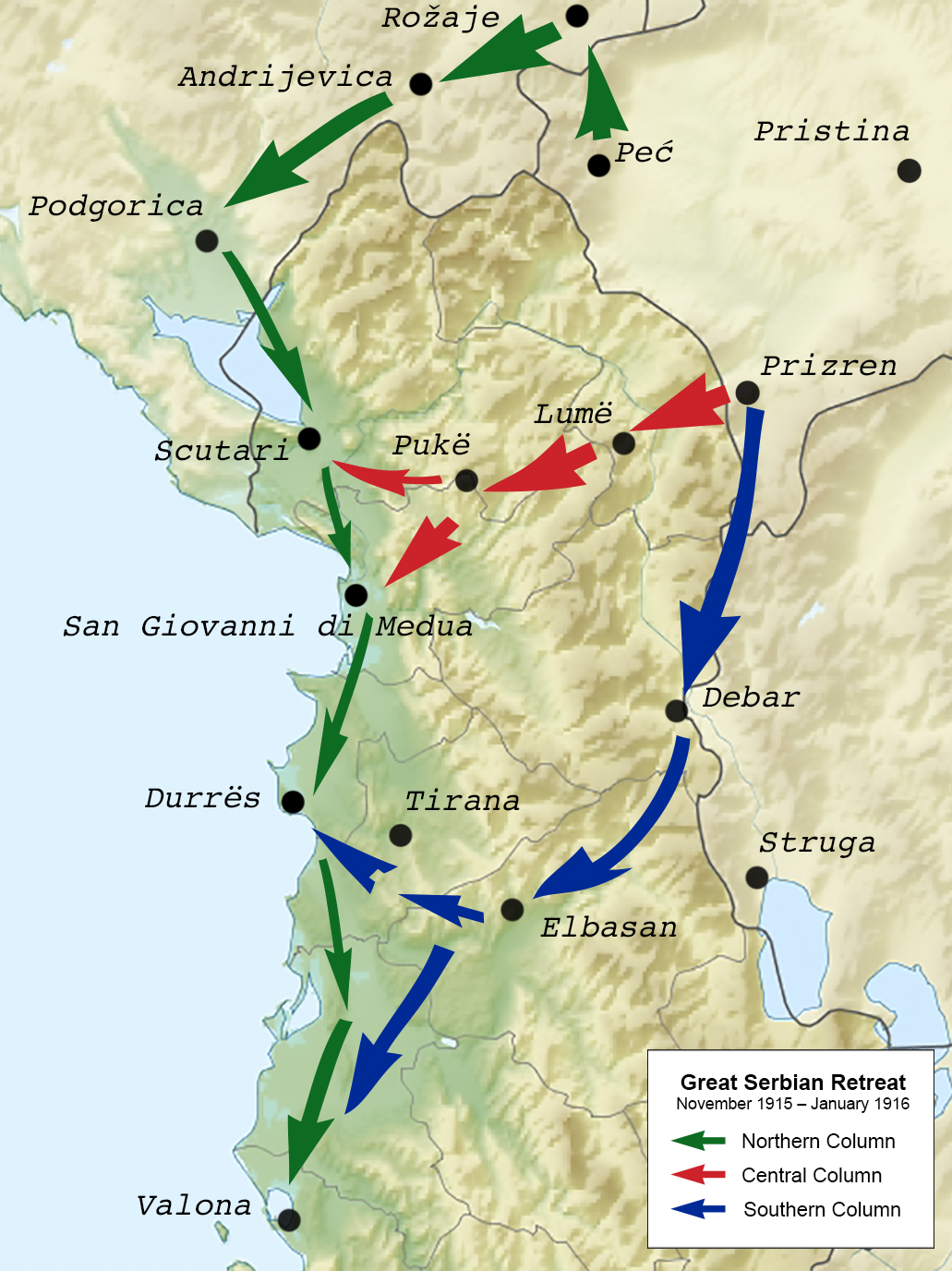
Routes of the Serbian Retreat, showing the Northern, Central, and Southern Columns through Montenegro and Albania

Severe winter conditions and rugged terrain proved insurmountable for the Austro-Hungarian Tenth Mountain Brigade as it attempted to continue its advance south from Ribarić. The only available route led through a steep, ice-covered mountain pass at an altitude of 4,921 feet (1,500 m), making further movement nearly impossible. Exposure to freezing temperatures had already resulted in 30 casualties among the Austrian forces. Faced with increasing logistical challenges and worsening conditions, Mackensen decided to abandon the pursuit on 24 November 1915, marking the end of the campaign.

With their pursuers no longer an immediate threat, the Serbian Army and tens of thousands of civilians continued their retreat along three separate routes, converging at Lake Skadar on the Albanian-Montenegrin border before heading toward the Adriatic coast. Many civilians were fleeing massacres committed by Austro-Hungarian forces, contributing to the sheer scale of the exodus.

Upon entering Albania, Essad Pasha Toptani, an Albanian leader and former Ottoman general allied with Serbia, provided limited protection. His gendarmes assisted retreating Serbian troops, but further north, Albanian tribal groups and irregular forces launched attacks, targeting the vulnerable Serbian columns. The Serbian High Command ordered troops to avoid looting and violence to prevent provoking an Albanian uprising but clashes still erupted, particularly around Istog, as tensions between Serbian forces and armed Albanian groups escalated. The various massacres of Albanians during the Balkans Wars committed by Serbian and Montenegrin troops had left lasting resentment among many Albanians, prompting some to retaliate against retreating soldiers, contributing to ongoing cycles of violence and retribution.

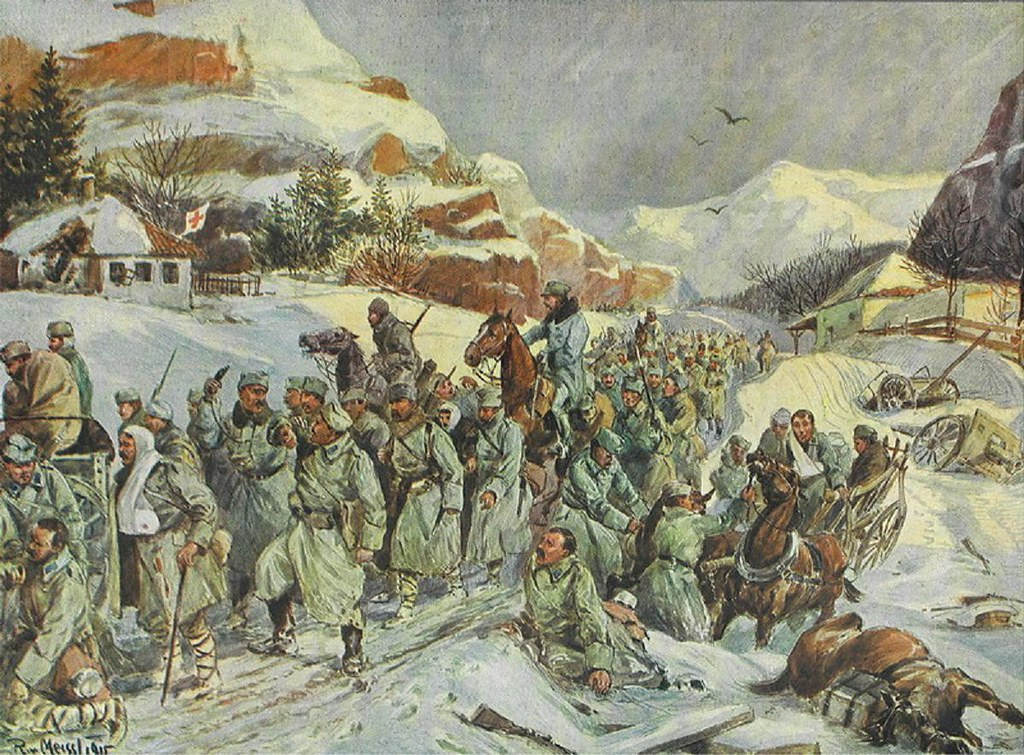
Painting of the Great Serbian retreat during the winter of 1915–1916

As the Serbian columns advanced deeper into Albania, the physical and psychological toll of the retreat worsened. Serbian writer Branislav Nušić described how many initially believed the retreat was temporary, but crossing into Albania felt like an irreversible break from Serbia. Food and medical supplies ran out, rivers became polluted, and disease spread rapidly. Refugees and soldiers alike now faced the most difficult part of the journey, crossing the snow-covered mountain passes of Montenegro and Albania in the depths of winter.

=== The northern route ===
The Northern Column, consisting of the First, Second, and Third Armies, as well as units from the Defence of Belgrade, took the route through Southern Montenegro, passing through Peć to Shkodër, via Rožaje, Andrijevica and Podgorica.

This column, which included the largest contingent of Serbian troops, also included a mobile medical unit the First Serbian-English Field Hospital, with two doctors, six nurses and six ambulance drivers. The medical unit was headed by British nurse and commissioned major Mabel Stobart. The Northern Column was tasked with covering the retreat of other units, acting as a rearguard against Austro-Hungarian, Bulgarian, and German forces. Delayed by this responsibility, the column only began leaving Peć on 7 December. Tracing an arc from north-west to south-west through Montenegrin territory and skirting the northern border of Albania through the snow-covered mountains, hunger, exposure, and disease took a heavy toll as it traversed the snow-covered Montenegrin mountains, killing thousands of soldiers, civilians, and prisoners of war.

The Northern Column began to reach Shkodër on 15 December. Serbian officers and artillery crews in Montenegro handed over 30 cannons to the Royal Montenegrin Army, Montenegrin forces played a key role in covering up the withdrawal, most notably against Austro-Hungarian forces in the Battle of Mojkovac.

=== The central route ===
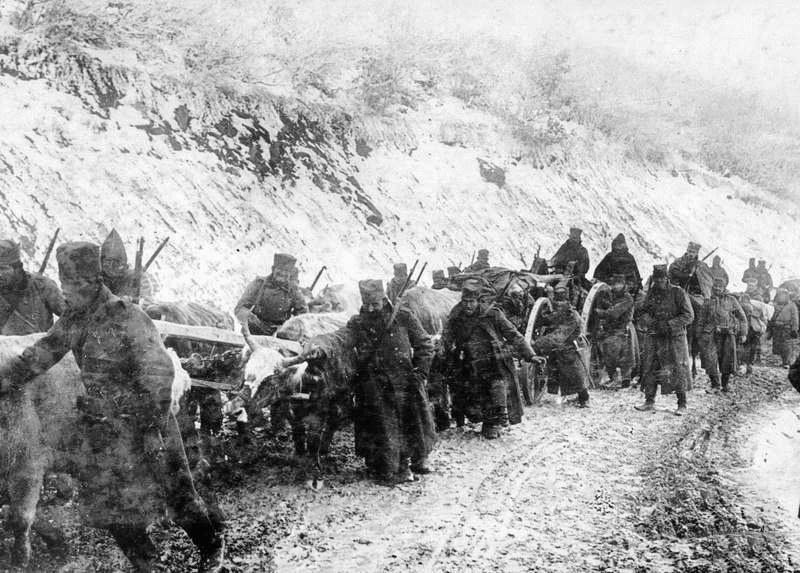
Serbian heavy artillery crossing the Babuna River in Macedonia during the retreat, November 1915, part of the Central Column’s withdrawal

The Central Column consisted of King Peter I, the court, government and General Staff took the route through central Kosovo across Northern Albania, from Prizren to Shkodër via Luma and Pukë.

Once across the Vizier's Bridge on the Drin River, the troops, who had retreated from Macedonia, continued west through Albania, ultimately to Lezhë. The Timok Division also continued to move south and then west through Albania to Durrës. It had the shortest route to the sea but encountered some resistance from hostile Albanians.

Regent Alexander crossed it in just two and a half days and the Serbian government set off on 24 November, reaching Shkodër four days later. The officers of the Supreme Command who accompanied the Chief of the General Staff Radomir Putnik took longer, leaving on 26 November and arriving in Shkodër on 6 December.

=== The southern route ===
The Southern Column followed the third route of withdrawal, from Prizren to Luma and further through the Albanian mountains to Debar and Struga.

The Southern Column was the first to depart and the last to arrive at the coast. The southern route presented the most direct way to make contact with Sarrail's Army of the Orient. The General Headquarters had asked the commanders of these groups to keep in constant telegraphic communication, but from the first day of the operations this was found to be impossible. The geography of the country did not allow of any other means of communication, so that the commanders of these groups were left to their own devices during the whole movement.

All the troops part of this group were placed under the orders of the commander of the Army of the Timok. The column left on 25 November and moved south all the way to Elbasan. Along the way it had to contend with Albanian resistance and Bulgarian attacks; on 10 December, the Bulgarians attacked Serbian positions along the crest of the Jabllanica mountain range. As the Bulgarians again reached Struga before them, Serbian soldiers and civilians turned south-westerly, marching down the Albanian coast to Vlorë and across via Tirana reaching Durrës on 21 December.

== Albanian coast ==
=== Aid shortages and Austro-Hungarian naval attacks ===
As early as 20 November 1915, Prime Minister Nikola Pašić sent an urgent appeal to the Allies, requesting food and supplies to be delivered to Adriatic ports for the Serbian Army and civilians. When the Northern and Central Columns arrived in Shkodër, they found no foreign ships or provisions leading to confusion and distress. Learning that some supplies had been brought to Durrës, approximately 60 kilometres (37 mi) away, Serbian forces and refugees continued their march further south.

While the absence of ships was alarming, Italian efforts to deliver aid had been severely hampered by Austro-Hungarian naval attacks. Several Italian merchant ships were sunk by enemy forces before they could unload provisions disrupting the supply chain. Refugees arriving in Shëngjin found the wrecks of Italian vessels which had been destroyed by mines before unloading. Food shipments from France and Britain, intended for Serbian troops, were stalled in Brindisi, Italy, as fears of Austrian naval attacks delayed transport.

The Austro-Hungarian Navy intensified its operations, targeting Allied supply lines. On 22 November, Austrian destroyers sank the Italian steamers Palatino and Gallinara, en route from Brindisi to Shëngjin and Durrës. Another Italian vessel, Unione, was scuttled after an Austro-Hungarian submarine attack. On 5 December, the Italian steamer Benedetto Giovanni and the Greek steamer Thira were sunk near Shëngjin by an Austrian cruiser. Further attacks followed on 8 and 9 January 1916, when the Austro-Hungarian Navy sank two additional Italian transport ships, Brindisi and Città di Palermo.

By mid-December, Serbian forces and civilians had gathered along the Albanian coast in large numbers. Troops arriving from Montenegro settled in Shkodër, while those who descended from the mountains were concentrated near Durrës, Kavajë, and Vlorë. The Serbian High Command reached Shkodër on 6 December and resumed its functions. The Serbian government-in-exile convened emergency meetings to manage the situation, forming a special cabinet for nutrition to coordinate food purchases and ration distribution. Military bakeries were reopened, but production was insufficient to meet demand, and cases of soldiers dying from exhaustion and starvation continued to be reported. Despite the chaotic conditions, approximately 140,000 Serbian soldiers reached the Adriatic, with 89,000 concentrated in Shkodër.

=== Planning the evacuation: Italy and Allied coordination ===
As conditions worsened, the Allies finalised evacuation plans. Rear Admiral Guglielmo Capomazza supervised the evacuation in Vlorë, Albania. The Duke of Abruzzi and Vice Admiral Emanuele Cutinelli Rendina, commander of Italian naval forces in the Southern Adriatic, were responsible for planning sea evacuations from Albania. It was established that larger ships would operate from Durrës and Vlorë, while smaller vessels would evacuate from Shëngjin. Altogether, 45 Italian, 25 French, and eleven British transport ships were employed in the evacuation. They carried out 202, 101, and 19 voyages, respectively.

Tensions arose over Italy's role in the evacuation process. Serbian officials suspected that Italy was reluctant to intervene, owing to political rivalries over Albania and Dalmatia. The Serbian envoy in Rome accused the Italian authorities of deliberately downplaying the scale of the refugee crisis to justify limited assistance. In response, the French government dispatched a special mission to assess conditions along the Albanian coast. On 22 December, French officials landed in Vlorë and submitted reports detailing the severity of the crisis. That same week, General Joseph Joffre convinced the French government to approve an evacuation plan. It was decided that Serbian troops would be transferred to Corfu, while civilians would be relocated to France or its colonies.

=== Execution of the evacuation and humanitarian crisis ===
The evacuation began in mid-January 1916, but logistical challenges persisted. Crowded ports, lack of medical care, and continued attacks by the Austro-Hungarian Navy complicated efforts. Along the coast, thousands of civilians were stranded in makeshift camps, with limited access to food and medical aid. Reports estimated that 3,000 refugees were left without proper assistance for weeks, with several deaths recorded daily.

Royal Navy Admiral Ernest Troubridge oversaw evacuation efforts from Shëngjin, converting the port into an improvised embarkation point for Serbian troops and refugees. Serbian diplomat Slavko Grujić, appointed as the Serbian delegate for refugees, worked alongside the Serbian Relief Fund, based in London, to accelerate the process. Grujić personally negotiated with Italian naval officers, urging them to increase the number of evacuees per voyage. At Shëngjin, he persuaded the captain of the transport Città di Bari to embark an additional 800 refugees, despite concerns over overcrowding. On 14 January 1916, the Serbian government, ministers, and members of the diplomatic corps boarded Città di Bari for Brindisi.

=== Final stages: the last departures and total evacuees ===
The Italians took over most of the Habsburg prisoners, transferring them to the uninhabited island of Asinara, off the coast of Sardinia. Nearly 5,000 refugees, mostly women, children, and elderly people, were relocated to Corsica, under the care of the Serbian Relief Fund and the Scottish Women's Military Hospital.

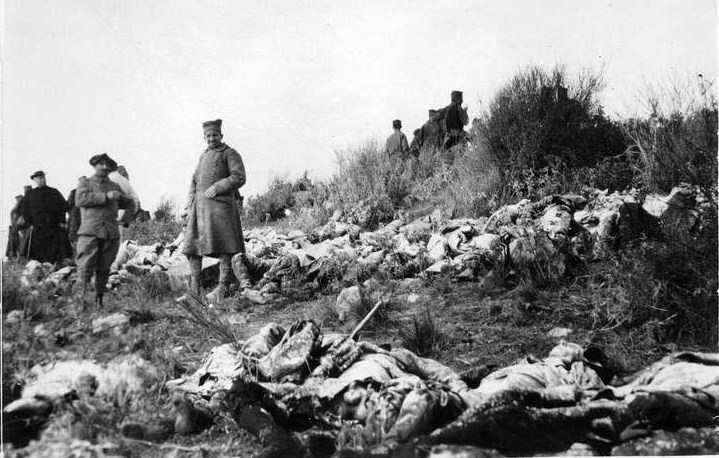
Vido Island, Corfu, February 1916. Corpses of Serbian recruits who died in a single night.

On 6 February 1916, the Serbian supreme command and Regent Alexander were evacuated to Corfu, where 120,000 evacuees had arrived by 15 February. Ten days later, the number reached 135,000. An additional 10,000 evacuees were taken to Bizerte, in French Tunisia, around the same time. The sick and wounded were transported to the Greek island of Vido to prevent the spread of epidemics. By early April, most Serbian troops had been transported to Corfu, Tunisia, or Corsica, while civilians were dispersed among various Allied territories. In total, 260,895 individuals were evacuated.

== Aftermath ==
=== Casualties and humanitarian impact ===
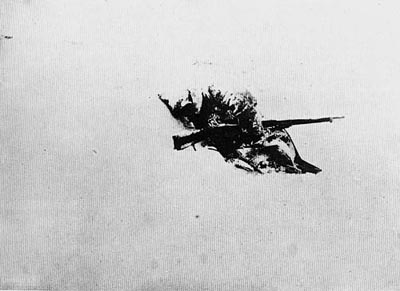
Serbian freezing to death during the retreat through Albania winter 1915–1916.

According to official statistics from 1919, 77,455 Serbian soldiers died, while 77,278 went missing. The Southern Column suffered the heaviest losses; among the 36,000 young boys ordered to join the retreat, approximately 23,000 perished within a month.

Of the estimated 220,000 Serbian civilian refugees who set off for the Adriatic coast, only about 60,000 survived. Many of those who reached safety were in such a weakened state that thousands died in the weeks following their rescue. The rocky composition of the Greek island of Vido made burials difficult, forcing the French to bury thousands at sea. More than 5,000 Serbian refugees are believed to have been laid to rest in the Ionian Sea near Vido, a site that became known as the Blue Graveyard (Serbian: Плава гробница, romanized: Plava grobnica).

Field Marshal Putnik, suffering from illness, was transported to Nice, France for medical treatment, where he died the following year. Nearly 5,000 Serbian refugees, primarily women and children, were evacuated to Corsica. They were cared for by the Scottish Women's Military Hospital, whose staff had accompanied them throughout the retreat. The operation was financed by the Serbian Relief Fund. Many of the young boys who survived were later sent to France and Britain for schooling.

=== Occupation of Serbia ===
Following the retreat, Serbia was divided into two separate military occupation zones. The Austro-Hungarian zone, which covered Northern and Central Serbia, established the Military General Governorate of Serbia, while the Bulgarian zone was divided into two separate administrative regions: the Military Inspection Area of Morava (centered in Niš) and the Military Inspection Area of Macedonia (centered in Skopje).

Both occupation regimes were highly repressive. Serbian civilians were subjected to mass internment, forced labour, famine, and denationalisation policies. In Bulgarian-occupied Serbia, a campaign of Bulgarisation was implemented, further alienating the Serbian population. Kosovo was partitioned between Austria-Hungary and Bulgaria. Metohija was incorporated into the Austro-Hungarian Military General Government of Montenegro, while Mitrovica and Vučitrn became part of the Austro-Hungarian Military Government of Serbia. The larger part of Kosovo, including Pristina, Prizren, Gnjilane, Uroševac, and Orahovac, was administered by the Bulgarian Military Region of Macedonia.

=== Serbian forces on the Salonika Front ===
Serbia began rebuilding its army in early 1916. More than 110,000 Serbian troops were transferred to the Allied base at Salonika after Greece entered the war. The Serbian Army was reorganised on Corfu, where it largely maintained its previous structure. Volunteers from Herzegovina, the Bay of Kotor, and Montenegro joined the Second Army, and Serbian forces were equipped with French weapons and trained under French military regulations. The reorganised Serbian forces included six infantry divisions and one cavalry division, each named after regions and rivers in Serbia.

Between March and May 1916, Serbian units were transported from Corfu to the northern Aegean coast, primarily by French naval forces. By June 127,000 Serbian troops were stationed on the Halkidiki Peninsula where they received further training and additional armaments. Their numbers grew to 152,000 by July, after which they were redeployed to the Salonika front. Serbia secured a degree of independent control over its troops while still coordinating with the broader Allied war effort. Despite the enormous human toll of the retreat, the reconstituted Serbian Army played a decisive role in the final Allied offensives, significantly contributing to the breakthrough on the Macedonian front and the liberation of Serbia.

== Legacy ==
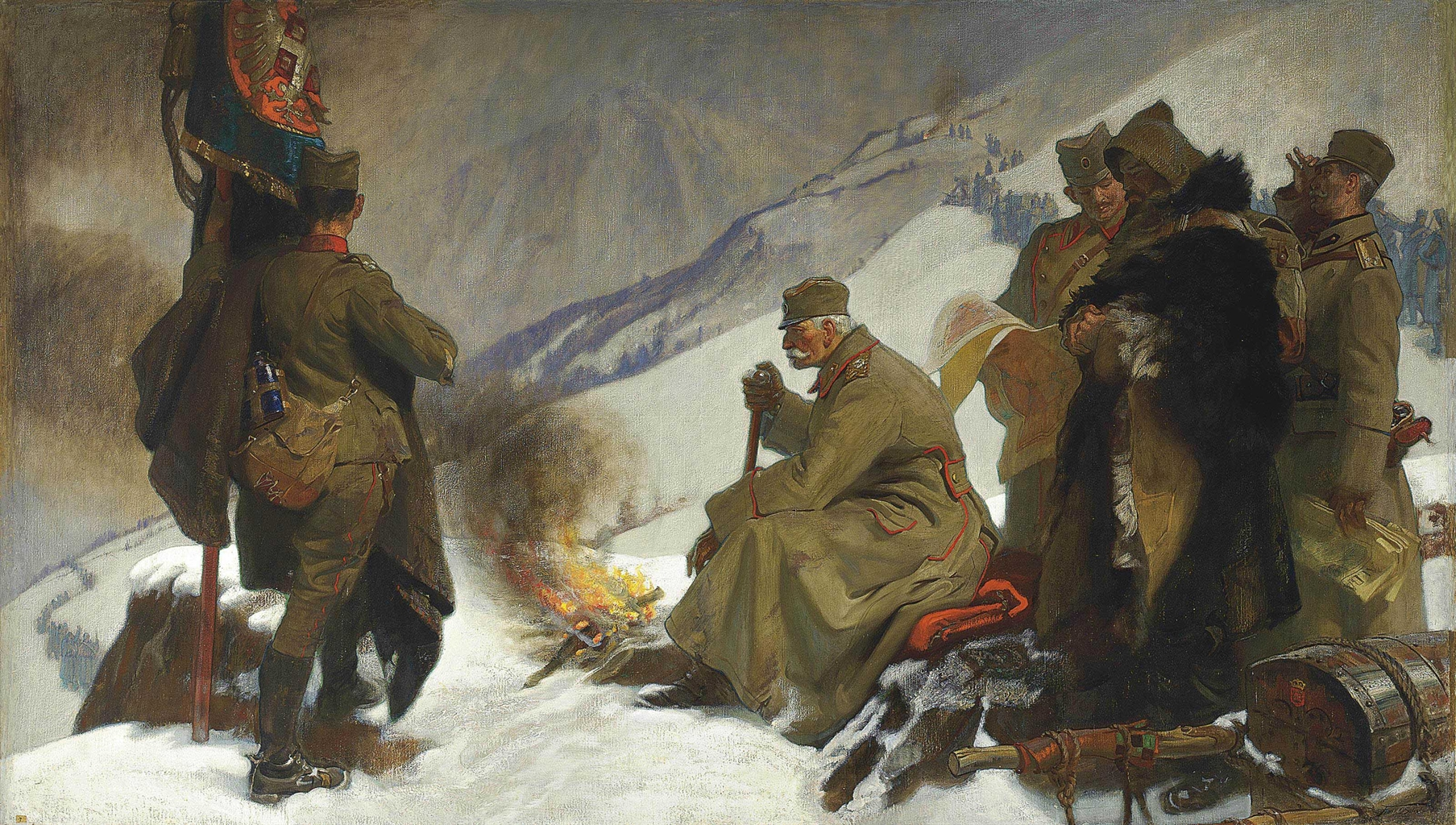
King Peter I of Serbia retreating across the Albanian Mountains during the Great Retreat, depicted in a 1919 painting by British artist Frank O. Salisbury (1874–1962)

The Great Retreat remains one of the most profound national tragedies in Serbian history. Due to the large number of casualties and the hardships experienced by the retreating soldiers and civilians, it is often referred to as the Albanian Golgotha, or Serbian Golgotha in Serbian memory and historical discourse. (Note: Sources refer to it either as the Albanian Golgotha, or Serbian Golgotha.)

Within Serbia, after the war it was commemorated using biblical symbolism; the retreat representing sacrifice followed by "resurrection" upon the country's eventual victory.

In 1921, King Alexander I established the Commemorative Medal for Loyalty to the Fatherland in 1915 to honour military personnel who survived the retreat. The medal became a symbol of sacrifice and survival, with many Serbian families preserving it as a cherished heirloom. During the 1930s, amid rising political tensions in Europe, Serbian leaders frequently referenced the retreat as a testament to national resilience. In 1938, veterans of the retreat founded the Society of the Albanian Commemorative Medal, reaffirming its historical significance as a moment of suffering and survival.

== Gallery ==
The Great Retreat
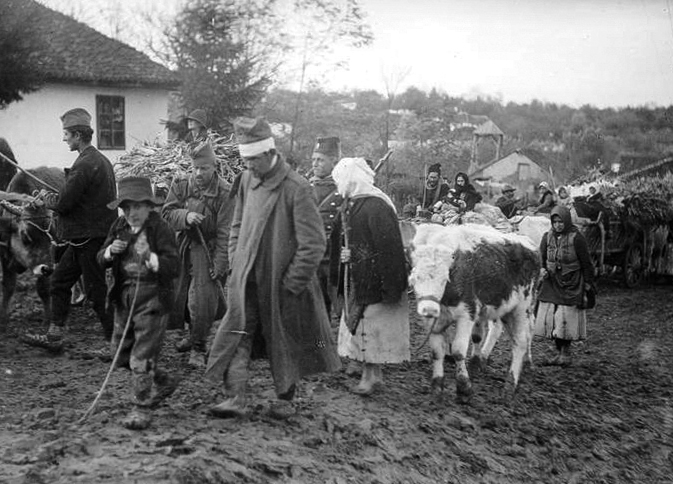
Serbian troops and refugees

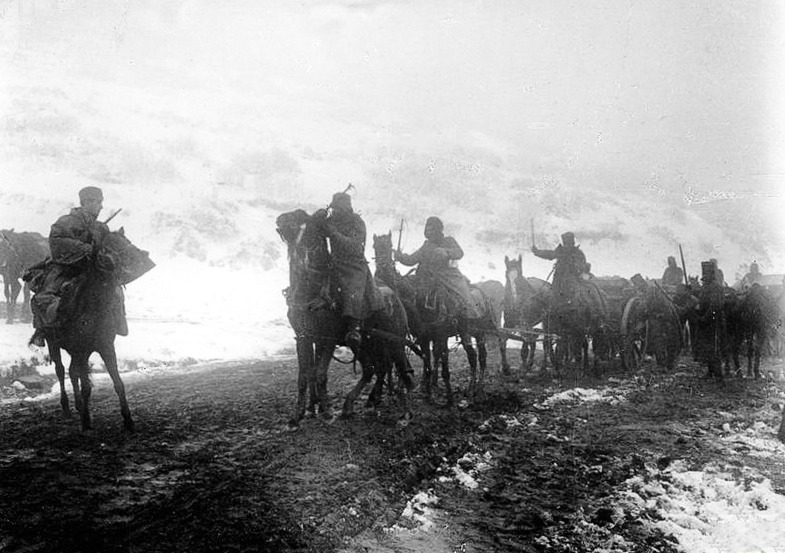
Horse artillery unit

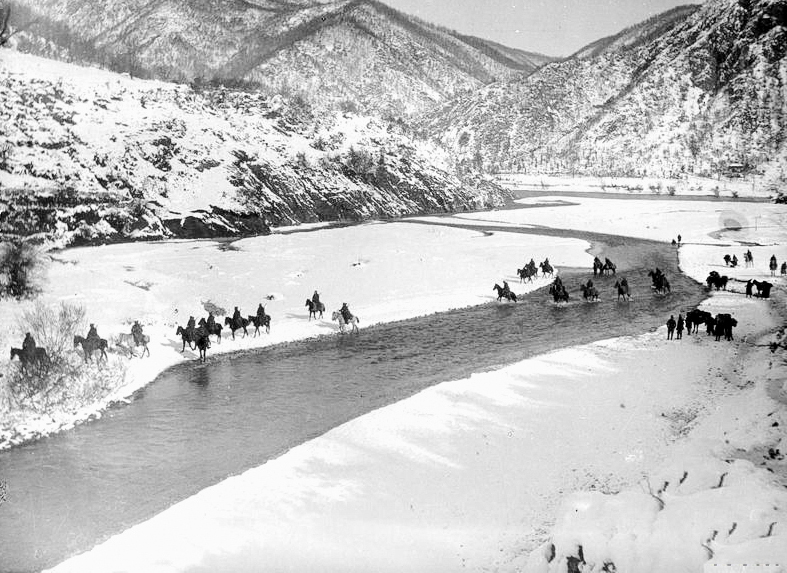
Cavalry crossing the Black Drin

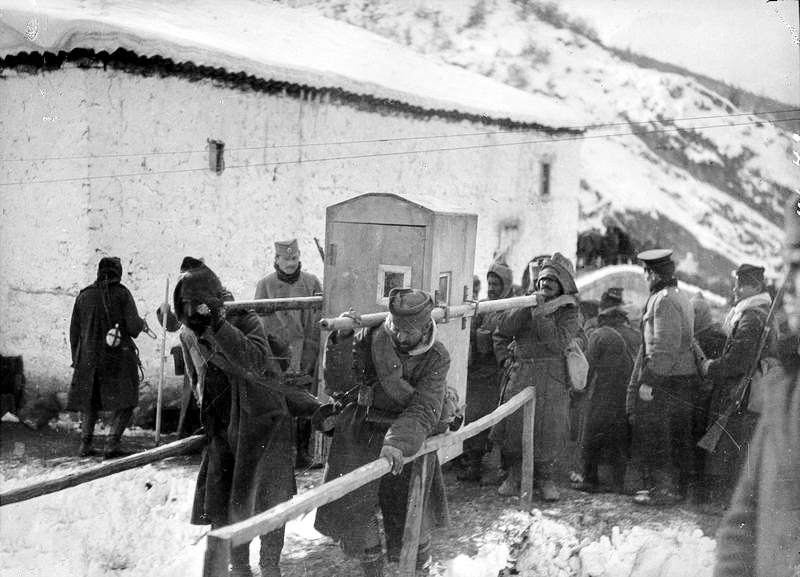
Radomir Putnik carried by bearers

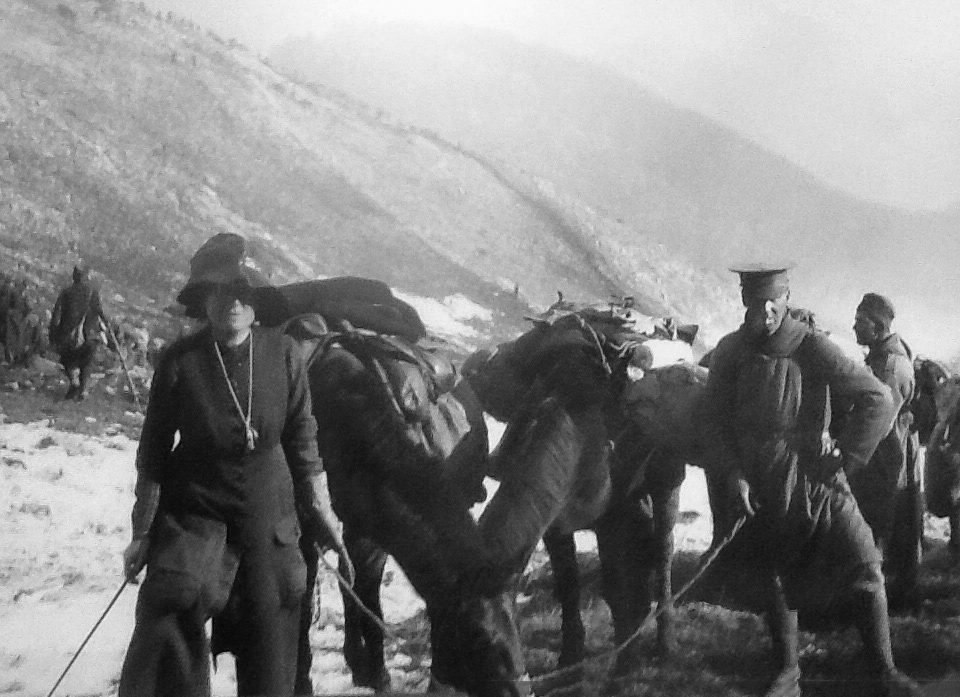
The Column of the First Serbian-English Field Hospital

== See also ==
- Great Migrations of the Serbs
- King Petar the First, a 2018 feature film starring Lazar Ristovski.
- Serbian Museum in Corfu
- "Kreće se lađa francuska", a WWI song composed by Branislav Milosavljević in Corfu
- "Tamo daleko", a 1916 song composed in Corfu
