= Honorary Unit of the Armed Forces of Bosnia and Herzegovina =

- Počasna jedinica Oružanih snaga BiH
- Active: 2004–present
- Country: Bosnia and Herzegovina
- Allegiance: Presidency of Bosnia and Herzegovina
- Branch: Armed Forces of Bosnia and Herzegovina
- Type: Honor Guard
- Part of: Military Police Battalion, Tactical Support Brigade
- Garrison/HQ: Butmir Military Base, Sarajevo

The Honorary Unit of the Armed Forces of Bosnia and Herzegovina (Bosnian: Počasna jedinica Oružanih snaga BiH), often referred to as the Honorary Guard is the premier ceremonial and guard unit responsible for military honors, state protocols, and official ceremonies representing the Armed Forces of Bosnia and Herzegovina and the Ministry of Defence.

== Overview ==
It began operations in late 2004, with the first set of training at Camp Butmir being supervised by a Sergeant Major affiliated with the Household Division of the British Army. The first event it participated in was made on 26 November 2004 at Sarajevo International Airport. It was designed to consist three platoons, one platoon from the Army of Republika Srpska, and one Bosniak and one Croat platoons from the Army of the Federation of Bosnia and Herzegovina. After the formation of the Military Police Battalion and the order of the Minister Selmo Cikotić on June 11, 2007, the unit was moved to its subordination.

== See also ==
- Honour Unit (Republika Srpska)
- Guard of the Serbian Armed Forces
- Honor Guard Battalion (Croatia)
