= King Petar the First =

2018 film

- Theatrical release poster
- Directed by: Petar Ristovski
- Written by: Milovan Vitezović; Petar Ristovski; Vladimir Ćosić
- Based on: Čarape kralja Petra by Milovan Vitezović
- Produced by: Michael Cowan; Lazar Ristovski
- Starring: Lazar Ristovski; Radovan Vujović; Milan Kolak
- Cinematography: Dušan Joksimović
- Edited by: Andrija Zafranović; Nenad Pirnat
- Production companies: Zillion films, Digitalkraft
- Release date: 5 December 2018
- Running time: 125 minutes
- Countries: Serbia; Greece
- Language: Serbian

King Petar the First (Serbian: Краљ Петар I / Kralj Petar I) is a 2018 Serbian-Greek war historical drama film directed by Petar Ristovski, starring Lazar Ristovski and Radovan Vujović. The screenplay is based on Milovan Vitezović's 1994 novel Čarape kralja Petra. It was selected as the Serbian entry for the Best International Feature Film at the 92nd Academy Awards, but it was not nominated and the best film at the Festival of Serbian film in Chicago.

== Plot ==
Peter I of Serbia was banished from Serbia as a young man. Many years later, he returns to his country to liberate its people and secure parliamentary democracy and later lead the country during World War I.

== Cast ==
Lazar Ristovski	Kralj Petar I Karađorđević
Radovan Vujović	Života
Milan Kolak	Marinko Spasojević
Ivan Vujić	Momčilo Gavrić
Danica Ristovski	Makrena
Svetozar Cvetković	Živojin Mišić
Tanasije Uzunović	vojvoda Radomir Putnik
Aleksandar Vučković	regent Aleksandar Karađorđević
Ivan Marković	Posilni
Marko Todorović	Đorđe Karađorđević
Marko Bacović	Nikola Pašić
Ljubiša Savanović	Apis
Nebojša Kundačina	Petar Bojović
Branko Jerinić	Stepa Stepanović
Dragan Boža Marjanović	colonel Milivoje Stojanović

== See also ==
- List of submissions to the 92nd Academy Awards for Best International Feature Film
- List of Serbian submissions for the Academy Award for Best International Feature Film
