= Zastava M59/66 =

Yugoslav semi-automatic rifle

Zastava M59/66 PAP
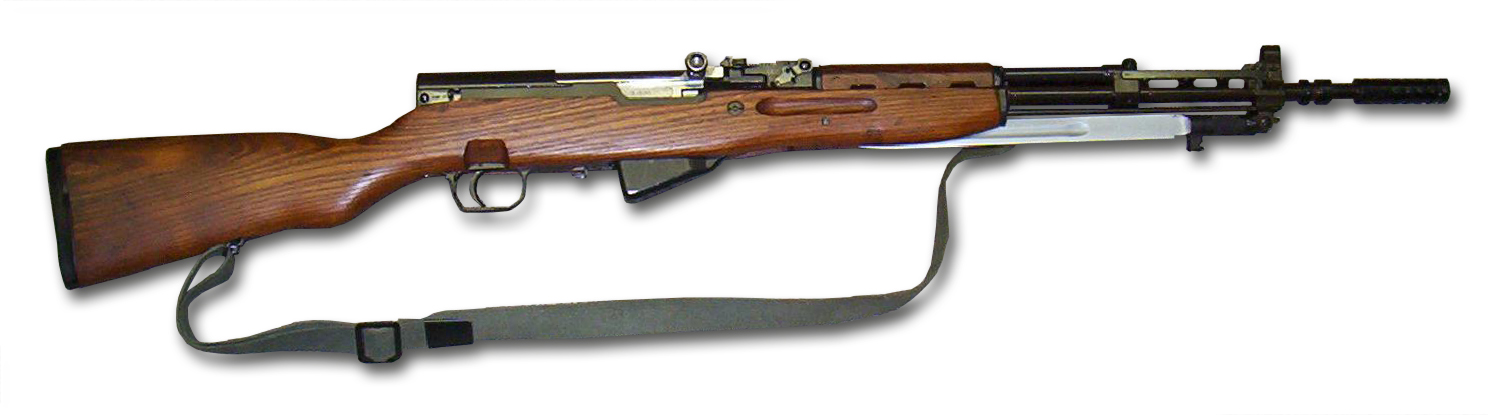
- Zastava M59/66A1
- Type: Semi-automatic rifle
- Place of origin: Socialist Federal Republic of Yugoslavia

Service history
- In service: 1961–present
- Used by: See Users
- Wars: See Conflicts

Production history
- Designer: Milan Ćirić (M59); Božidar Blagojević, Miloš Ostojić, and Milan Vasiljević (M59/66)
- Designed: 1957–1959
- Produced: 1961–1986
- No. built: 234,060
- Variants: See Variants

Specifications
- Mass: 4.1 kg (9.0 lb)
- Length: 1.12 m (44 in) (with bayonet folded)
- Barrel length: 550 mm (22 in)
- Cartridge: 7.62×39mm
- Action: Gas-operated (tilting bolt)
- Rate of fire: 35–40 rounds/min
- Muzzle velocity: 735 m/s (2,410 ft/s)
- Effective firing range: 500 m (550 yd)
- Feed system: 10-round fixed magazine fed by stripper clip
- Sights: Iron sights graduated from 100 to 1,000 meters

The Zastava M59/66 PAP is a Yugoslavian licensed derivative of the Soviet SKS semi-automatic rifle. In Yugoslavia, it received the popular nickname "papovka" derived from PAP, the abbreviation for poluautomatska puška, or Serbo-Croatian for "semi-automatic rifle". The M59/66 functions identically to the SKS, but has a permanently attached grenade launcher spigot that also serves as a muzzle brake. The weapon was also produced with a folding grenade launcher sight which is normally folded flat behind the front sight.

== History ==
=== Development ===
Yugoslavia's defense industry started planning the development and production of a new self-loading rifle design during the 1950s, namely to replace the bolt-action Zastava M48 then in service with the Yugoslav People's Army. In 1957, Yugoslavia acquired the rights to manufacture the Soviet SKS semi-automatic carbine under license, and a research team led by Milan Ćirić was placed in charge of the program. Limited production of the SKS commenced in 1961 at Preduzeće 44 (Enterprise Facility 44), which was located in Kragujevac and had undergone an unprecedented expansion in 1953 to better accommodate mass production of various weapons. Aside from this preliminary production run, however, no SKS carbines were produced at the Kragujevac facility again until 1964, when the weapon type finally entered serialized mass production. In the interim period, Zastava tooled up for SKS production with new equipment, including vertical forging presses, purchased from Steyr Arms of Austria.

The earliest examples of the SKS manufactured in Kragujevac under the auspices of Zastava received the designation M59 and initially resembled late Soviet pattern carbines, albeit without the chrome-lined barrels characteristic to the latter. Between 1964 and 1967, Zastava manufactured 52,069 M59s.

In 1966, the M59 was modified to fire 22mm rifle grenades via the addition of an integrated grenade launcher spigot. The new model included a folding ladder sight for use with the rifle grenades as well; this also doubled as a gas shutoff to enable the rifle to cycle correctly. This variant received the designation M59/66. The new M59/66 concept was jointly designed by two Zastava engineers, Božidar Blagojević and Miloš Ostojić, and Colonel Milan Vasiljević of the Military Technical Institute. Production of the M59/66 lasted from 1966 until 1970. After 1970, the M59/66 was manufactured with flip-up tritium or painted phosphorus night sights. This received the designation M59/66 A1. Between 1966 and 1971, Zastava manufactured 132,081 M59/66s and M59/66A1s, at which time production ceased for the Yugoslavian People's Army. The M59/66A1 continued to be manufactured for export as late as 1986.

=== Service ===
The M59/66 remained in service with military and security forces in Yugoslavia until the dissolution of that country in 1991, although by then it had been largely superseded by the Zastava M70 assault rifle. At the time, most of the M59/66s were either warehoused or in limited service with territorial defense units. Due to the availability of surplus M70s and other Kalashnikov-pattern rifles during the Yugoslav Wars, the M59/66 was withdrawn from active service in Yugoslavia's various successor states during the 1990s.

During the South African Border War, the People's Liberation Army of Namibia (PLAN) received an unknown number of M59/66s and 22mm M60 rifle grenades, also of Yugoslav origin, as military aid. Even in the southern African theater, the weapon's basic design was considered quite dated by the peak of the war in the 1980s; however, PLAN retained the M59/66 due to its lack of equivalent weapons capable of launching rifle grenades. PLAN insurgents made effective use of rifle grenades fired from M59/66s against light armoured South African military vehicles, namely the Casspir. The insurgents loaded their M59/66s with the M60 anti-tank variant as well as the more slender M60 AP1 anti-personnel rifle grenade. They frequently initiated ambushes of South African military or police columns by attempting to disable the lead vehicle with an M60, either targeting the engine block or the wheels. By the end of the war, each PLAN section included at least one insurgent armed with an M59/66, and another with an RPG-7. Larger PLAN units included an equal number of insurgents armed with M59/66s and RPGs, with each carrying at least three rifle grenades or five PG-7 projectiles, respectively.

Second-line units of the Ethiopian Ground Forces used large numbers of the M59/66 alongside original Soviet SKS carbines during the Ogaden War.

The Republic of Macedonia Army used the M59/66 during the 2001 NLA insurgency. Throughout the early and mid 2000s, the M59/66 remained the standard issue rifle of Macedonian rear echelon units and artillery crews.

== Description ==
The Zastava M59/66 PAP is identical in function and operation to the Soviet SKS in nearly every respect, except its ability to launch 22mm rifle grenades from an integral grenade launcher spigot mounted at the front of the barrel. The rifle has been fitted with a folding ladder sight for use in launching grenades. This sight is normally locked into a folded position atop the gas block. Prior to firing a rifle grenade, the sight is unlocked by depressing a switch on the gas port. This action also closes off the gas port in the barrel, which prevents the semi-automatic action from being cycled while a grenade is being launched. The sight ladder may then be raised and locked into the vertical position.

The M59/66 was fitted with an unusual bayonet mount which also doubled as the mount for the front sight and the folding grenade launcher sight. The original Soviet blade bayonet as standard to the SKS had to be replaced by a unique Yugoslav bayonet to accommodate the new mount placement.

A commercial variant of the M59 and M59/66 series, available for sale to civilians in some of the post-Yugoslav republics, lacked the bayonet or the ability to fire rifle grenades.

== Conflicts ==
- South African Border War (1966–1990)
- Ogaden War (1977–1978)
- Gulf War (1990–1991)
- Yugoslav Wars (1991–2001)
  - Ten-Day War (1991)
  - Croatian War of Independence (1991–1995)
  - Bosnian War (1992–1995)
  - Kosovo War (1998–1999)
  - 2001 insurgency in Macedonia (2001)

== Users ==
=== Current users ===
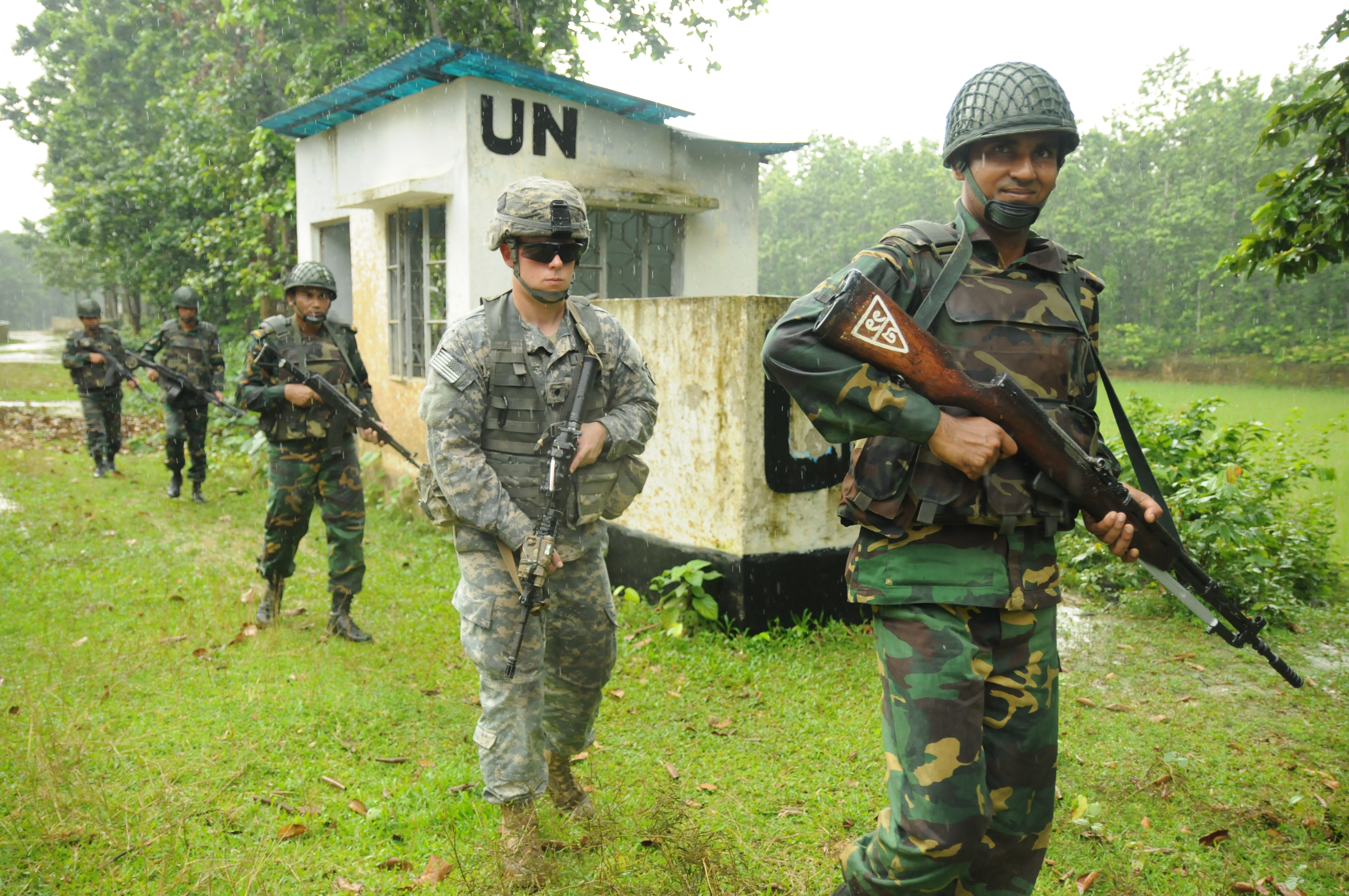
Bangladesh Army soldiers marching with a soldier from the United States in single file during a tactical training exercise. Note the point man carrying Zastava M59/66.

- Bangladesh
- Bosnia and Herzegovina - used by Honour Guard of Armed Forces of Bosnia and Herzegovina.
  - Republika Srpska - used by Honour Unit of Ministry of Interior of Republika Srpska.
- Croatia - used by Croatian Honour Guard.
- Montenegro - Used by Honour Guard Company.
- North Macedonia - used by the Honor Guard Battalio/Ceremonial Guard Battalion.
- Serbia - used by the Guard of the Serbian Armed Forces.
- Slovenia - used by Slovenian Guards Unit.
- Zambia

=== Former users ===
- Angola
- Ethiopia
- Ba'athist Iraq
- People's Liberation Army of Namibia
- Yugoslavia - used by Yugoslav People's Army; it was standard military rifle since the middle 1960s before it was replaced by Zastava M70 in the early 1980s.
