= Serbian Museum in Corfu =

Museum in Corfu, Greece

Coordinates: 39°37′19.65″N 19°55′19.85″E

- Српска кућа
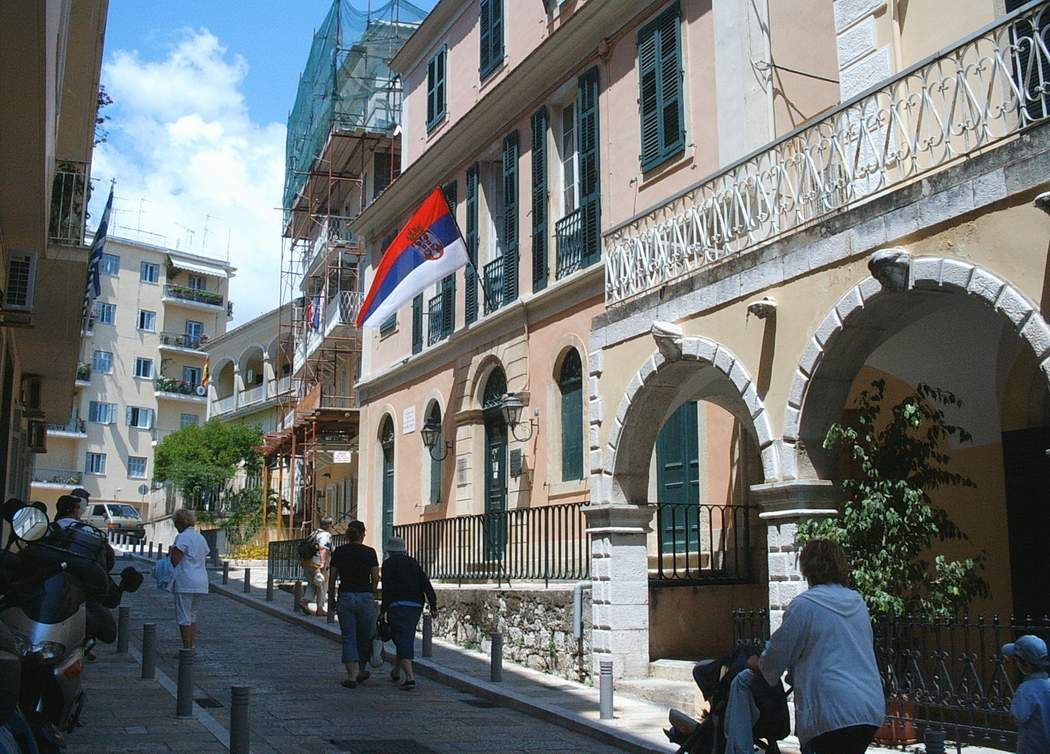
- Location: Corfu, Greece

The Serbian Museum in Corfu (Serbian: Српска кућа/Srpska kuća, meaning "Serbian house") is a museum in Corfu, Greece.

== Exhibition ==
The museum houses rare exhibits about the Serbian soldiers' tragic fate during the First World War. The remnants of the Serbian Army of about 150,000 soldiers together with their government in exile, found refuge and shelter in Corfu, following the collapse of the Serbian Front as a result of the Austro-Hungarian attack that began on 6 October 1915.

Exhibits include photographs from the three years stay of the Serbians in Corfu, together with other exhibits such as uniforms, arms and ammunition of the Serbian army, Serbian regimental flags, religious artifacts, surgical tools, and other decorations of the Kingdom of Serbia.

== See also ==
- Great Retreat (Serbia)
