= National Heroes =

National Heroes (Serbo-Croatian: Народни хероји, Narodni heroji) or also known as Arrive of the Commander (Serbo-Croatian: Долазак команданта, Dolazak komandanta) or March of the National Heroes, written by Ferdo Pomykalo in 1944, is the ceremonial march used in many countries on the territory of the former Socialist Federal Republic of Yugoslavia wr.

March has a role in formal ceremonies role and it was widely used during period of the Socialist Federal Republic of Yugoslavia when it was played after the national anthem on receptions of the Yugoslav president Josip Broz Tito and guests in Yugoslavia. Beside ceremonial use, this march was also sometimes played in concerts as for example by Šibenik and Trogir people's orchestra on May 5, 1957 and by Police Band of the Ministry of Interior of Republika Srpska on November 21, 2018.

== Controversy ==
Author of the march is uncertain, as is the origin of the march. The possible origin of the march is divided between two composers in time of the World War II, Ferdo Pomykalo and Antun Kopitović, more known as Ante. The political differences between these two composers of the same era makes for controversy because Pomykalo was a Yugoslav partisan and illegal fighter, while Kopitović was loyal to Independent State of Croatia. One suggested version of origin is that during the end of the war Kopitović performed this march while Pomykalo was in audience listening and remembering. There is also controversy about the name of the march. First name was Dolazak komandanta (Arrive of the Commander) and it is possible that it deliberately is not specified who the commander is because it is possible to be linked with some Ustaše or Yugoslav partisan commander.
