= Kreće se lađa francuska =

Serbian war song

Kreće se lađa francuska (Serbian Cyrillic: Креће се лађа француска; lit. 'The French Boat is Sailing') is a Serbian war song from the First World War, first sung in a Salonika harbor, where the Serbian army was recuperating after a long and painful withdrawal through the Albanian mountains. The author of the original text of the poem is Serbian officer colonel Branislav Milosavljević. The song was frequently performed in both France and Serbia after the war and is commonly used as a symbol of Serbian and French friendship.

== Lyrics ==
Silno je more duboko, (Mighty is the deep sea)
Duboko, plavo široko. (Deep, blue and wide)
Nigde mu kraja videti, (Its end is nowhere in sight)
Ne mogu misli podneti. (I cannot bear the thought.)

Kreće se lađa francuska, (The French ship is departing)
Sa pristaništa solunska, (From the harbor of Salonika)
Transport se kreće srbadi, (Transport of Serbs moves)
Ratnici, braća bolesni. (Warriors, wounded brothers)

Svaki se vojnik borio, (Every soldier fought)
U rovu slavu slavio, (And celebrated his slava in the trench)
Sretan se Bogu molio, (Happy (he) was praying to the God)
Da bi se kući vratio. (Hoping to return home)

Polazim tužan, bolestan, (I depart sad and ill)
Pomislih: Bože, nisam sam, (Thought: "God, I am not alone")
I moja braća putuju, (My brothers are traveling too)
Da sa mnom skupa tuguju. (To mourn, together, with me)

Radosti nema ni za tren, (There is no joy even for a moment)
Naiđe švapski sumaren, (For a Kraut sub is approaching)
Svi mole svetog Nikolu, (And all pray to St. Nicholas)
Njegovu silu na moru. (For his force at sea)
