= Milivoje Stojanović =

Serbian military commander (1873–1914)

Colonel Milivoje Stojanović
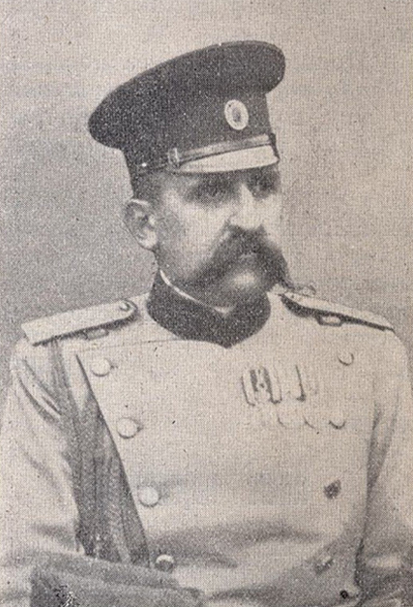
- Stojanović during the Balkan Wars
- Born: 18 September 1873; Požarevac, Serbia
- Died: 4 December 1914 (aged 41); Lazarevac, Serbia
- Military career
- Allegiance: Kingdom of Serbia
- Branch: Royal Serbian Army
- Service years: 1892–1914
- Rank: Colonel
- Nickname: Brka (Mustachio)
- Units: XII Regiment; Second Iron Regiment
- Conflicts: Balkan Wars; Battle of Bregalnica; World War I; Battle of Cer; Battle of Drina; Battle of Kolubara †

Milivoje Stojanović (Serbian Cyrillic: Миливоје Стојановић; 18 September 1873 – 4 December 1914) was a Serbian military commander who served during the Balkan Wars and during the Serbian Campaign (part of the larger Balkans Campaign) during World War I.

After his death in the Battle of Kolubara, Serbian composer Stanislav Binički composed the March on the Drina in his honour.

== Career ==
Stojanović graduated from the military academy with the 22nd class and became an infantry lieutenant in 1892.

After the conquest of Rajčanski rid, as a key ground for victory in the Battle of Bregalnica, the commander of the First Army, Crown Prince Alexander I, was so delighted with the performance of the XII Regiment that he personally approached Stojanović (who commanded the unit), congratulated him, and removed the Order of Karađorđe's Star (with swords) from his chest and personally stuck it on the chest of Stojanović.

== Death and legacy ==
In the First World War in 1914, his Second Iron Regiment took part in the Battle of Cer, in its very center, on Tekeriš. He also distinguished himself as the commander of the Iron Regiment in the Battle of Kolubara. During the Battle of Kolubara, he contracted pneumonia. Seeing that his men were dying, Stojanović, although seriously ill, personally led the regiment in a new assault, and on that occasion Kremenica was conquered and Stojanović was killed. The March on the Drina was composed in his honour.

A comic book publisher dedicated to the First World War called Linije fronta (Front Lines) published the comic book Gvozdeni (Iron) dedicated to Stojanović and his death during the Battle of Kolubara.

In the film King Petar of Serbia, Stojanović is played by actor Dragan Boža Marjanović.
