= Branislav Milosavljević =

Serbian Army leader

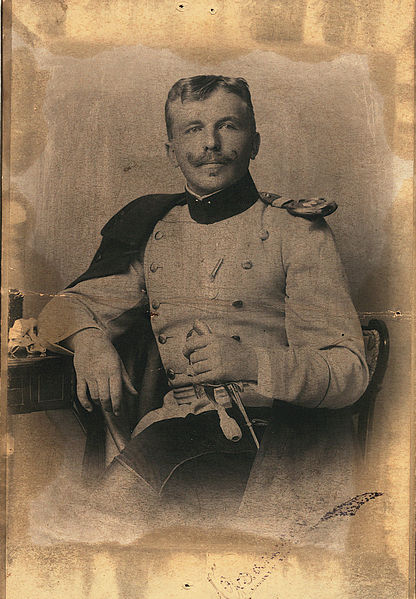
- Milosavljević in 1910 (photo by Milan Jovanović)
- Born: Branislav R. Milosavljević; 2 August 1879; Požarevac, Principality of Serbia
- Died: 17 April 1944 (aged 64); Belgrade, Nazi-occupied Serbia
- Other names: Brana
- Occupations: Politician, military officer and writer
- Known for: Authoring the song Kreće se lađa francuska

Branislav R. Milosavljević (Serbian Cyrillic: Бранислав Р. Милосављевић; 2 August 1879 – 17 April 1944) was a poet and a colonel of the Army of the Kingdom of Serbia, the first mayor of Durrës within Drač County and author of numerous patriotic poems, most notably the famous war poem Izgnanici, better known as Kreće se lađa francuska (The French Ship is Sailing).

During World War I, his patriotism inspired him to write stirring war songs, one of which, Kreće se lađa francuska, was printed by the order of King Peter I of Serbia and distributed in the thousands. It was immediately transcribed into music.

In 1940, Milosavljević retired to his property in Belgrade, where he, by his vast library of books, devoted himself to literature for the rest of his life. Milosavljević's dramatic talent was characteristically Serbian, his poems were well constructed and effective, arousing emotions.

After returning from Nazi captivity, he was killed on 17 April 1944 as a result of the Allied bombing of Belgrade.
