= March on the Drina =

Serbian patriotic song

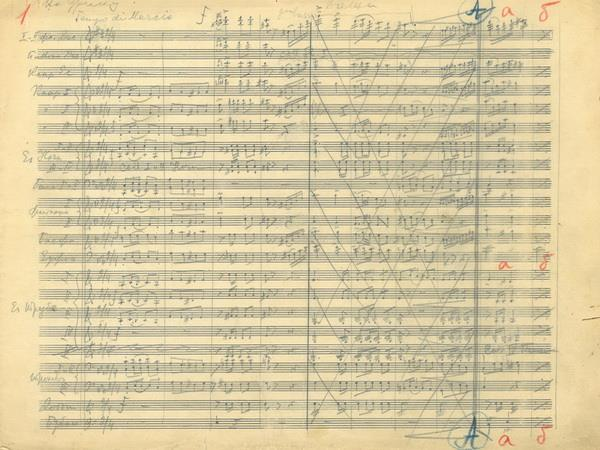
- Stanislav Binički's original hand-written score

Song
- Released: 1915
- Songwriter: Stanislav Binički

Audio sample
- file; help

The "March on (or to) the Drina" (Serbian: Марш на Дрину, romanized: Marš na Drinu, pronounced [mârʃ na drǐːnu]) is a Serbian patriotic march which was composed to commemorate the Serbian victory of the Serbian Army in Battle of Cer during World War I and came to be seen as a symbol of Serbian resistance and victory in the World War I. Along with the other World War I song, Tamo daleko, it became a powerful symbol of Serbian culture and national identity and remains popular amongst Serbs in the Balkans and the diaspora.

== History ==
=== World War I ===
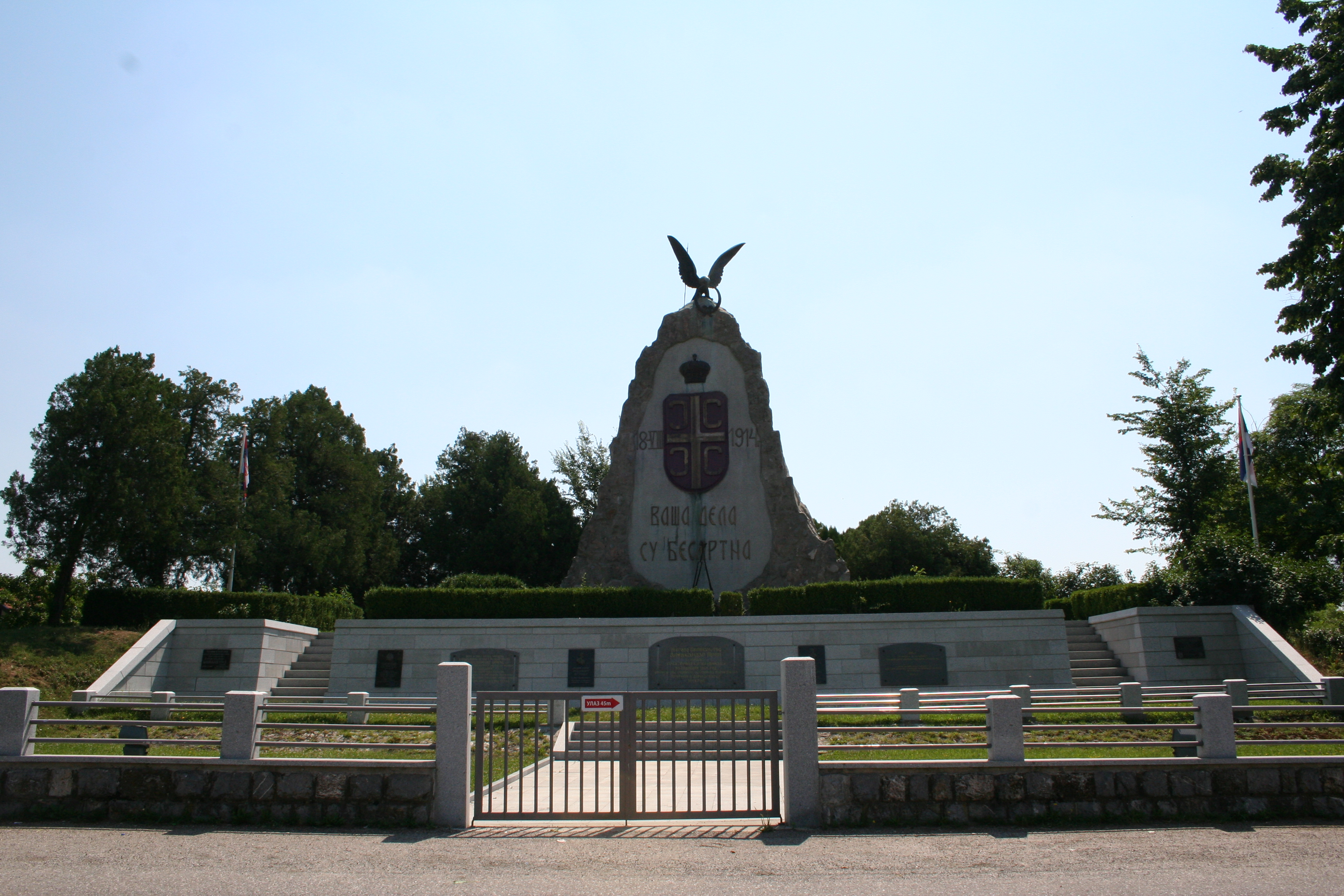
The Cer Memorial Ossuary dedicated to the Serbian soldiers killed in the battle

The Drina river served as the boundary between Bosnia and Serbia, and by the outbreak of World War I, Bosnia had been under the control of Austria-Hungary for more than three decades. The river is an important symbol of Serbian national identity, as there is a historic desire of Serbs in the Serbia to unite with brethren living in Bosnia. The Serbian defeat of Austro-Hungarian forces at the Battle of Cer in August 1914 was the first Allied victory over the Central Powers during World War I.

Stanislav Binički composed what became known as "March on the Drina" shortly after the Battle of Cer. Binički dedicated it to his favourite commander in the Serbian Army, Col. Milivoje Stojanović, who had fought during the Battle of Cer, but was killed later in the Battle of Kolubara. His composition was initially titled "March to Victory". The song experienced widespread popularity during and after the war.

=== Socialist Yugoslavia ===
The song was popular in Socialist Yugoslavia after World War II. It was released as a single and other formats on the Zagreb-based Jugoton label. The recording by Ansambl Urošević was awarded Zlatna Ploča ("Gold Record") for their single release on Jugoton. Song was played at the presentation ceremony for the Nobel Prize in Literature when Serbian writer Ivo Andrić was named a Nobel laureate in 1961.

The Avala Film studio released a war film in 1964, titled March on the Drina, that featured the march in a historical dramatization of the 1914 Battle of Cer and based on the march which featured the tune.

=== Contemporary period ===
In 1992, song received a plurality of popular vote on referendum for the new national anthem of Serbia, but was never officially adopted. That same year, the Socialist Party of Serbia used the song as the soundtrack for an important promotional spot prior to the 1992 Serbian general elections.

In 2013, the song was at the centre of a controversy after it was performed by a Serbian choir entertaining the United Nations General Assembly. Vuk Jeremić, the President of the United Nations General Assembly, Ban Ki-moon, the Secretary-General of the United Nations, and other United Nations officials gave the song a standing ovation. Bosniak organizations responded to the performance by demanding that Jeremić be removed from his position as President of the United Nations General Assembly. Jeremić stated that "we Serbs are very proud of it [the song] and wanted to share it with the world". He went on to say that "regrettable attempts at twisting the meaning of our musical gift offered to the world last Monday are deeply offensive to the Serbian people". The United Nations later apologized for the ovation and Ban Ki-moon expressed regret that some were offended by the song.

== Lyrics ==
Serbian lyrics to the song were written in 1964 in Socialist Yugoslavia by poet and journalist Miloje Popović to commemorate the 50th anniversary of the Battle of Cer. Only four verses of Miloje Popovic's 1964 poem were recorded in 1966 by vocalist Ljubivoje Vidosavljević and the Narodni Orkestar "Carevac".

Serbian

У бој, крените јунаци сви
Крен'те и не жал'те живот свој
Цер да чује строј, Цер нек види бој
А река Дрина славу, храброст
И јуначку руку оца, сина!

Пој, пој Дрино, водо хладна ти
Памти, причај кад су падали
Памти храбри строј
Који је пун огња, силне снаге
Протерао туђина са реке наше драге!

Пој, пој Дрино, причај роду ми
Како смо се храбро борили
Певао је строј, војев'о се бој
Крај хладне воде
Крв је текла
Крв је лила
Дрином због слободе!

Serbian Latin

U boj, krenite junaci svi
Kren'te i ne žal'te život svoj
Cer da čuje stroj, Cer nek vidi boj
A reka Drina slavu, hrabrost
I junačku ruku oca, sina!

Poj, poj Drino, vodo hladna ti
Pamti, pričaj kad su padali
Pamti hrabri stroj
Koji je pun ognja, silne snage
Proterao tuđina sa reke naše drage!

Poj, poj Drino, pričaj rodu mi
Kako smo se hrabro borili
Pevao je stroj, vojev'o se boj
Kraj hladne vode
Krv je tekla
Krv je lila
Drinom zbog slobode!

English

To battle, march on, brave heroes all,
Go forward, let your life for duty fall!
Let Cer behold the line, let Cer now see the fight, and may Drina
Hear the glory, courage and the strong heroic hand of father and son!
Sing, sing, Drina, cold water, pray!
Remember, tell the tale of those who lay!
Remember how the front, with mighty force and fire blazing,
Drove out the foreign foe from banks we hold so dear!
Sing, sing, Drina, tell our people why!
And how we fought with spirit brave and high!
The line sang out in strife, the battle raged near the cold river,
Blood was flowing, blood was shed by Drina for our freedom!

== International hit ==
The composition became an international hit and a staple of world music. Swedish composer Felix Stahl obtained the rights to the song which he published and promoted. Danish guitarist Jørgen Ingmann had a number one hit on the Danish pop singles chart in 1963 in a version arranged for solo electric guitar on the Swedish Metronome Records label. His recording was also released in West Germany, where it reached No. 5, in the UK, in France, and in the U.S. on ATCO Records, 6277. Patti Page, The Shadows, Chet Atkins, Frankie Yankovic, Horst Wende, and James Last also recorded the song.

There were many different lyrics set to the music in several languages, English, German, and Italian. English lyrics were added in 1964 by American songwriter Vaughn Horton for a recording by Patti Page under the title "Drina (Little Soldier Boy)". German lyrics were added by Walter Rothenburg in 1964 and Bert Olden in 1976. Italian lyrics were added in 1964 by Daniele Pace for the recording by Marie Laforêt.

== Popular international versions ==
- Jørgen Ingmann – "Marchen Til Drina" as a Metronome 45 single, B 1575, Denmark, 1963. Charts: #1, Denmark; #5, Germany
- Ansambl "Urosevic" featuring violinist Vlastimir Pavlovic Carevac, on Metronome in Sweden, on Jugoton in Yugoslavia, 1963
- The Jokers – "Drina" as a Discostar and Brunswick 45 single, Belgium, 1963
- Will Glahé's Bohème Ballhouse Band – "Drina Marsch" on Decca LP, 1964; 45 A side single, Decca D 19473, West Germany, 1963.
- Jack Bulterman – "Drina" as an A side 45 picture sleeve single, 1963, Netherlands
- The Spotnicks – "Drina" as a 45 single on Swedisc and W & G, Sweden; on CNR in the Netherlands as "Drina Mars", 1964. Rerecorded in 1977. Charts: #8, the Netherlands, 1964.
- Patti Page – "Drina (Little Soldier Boy)" released as a Columbia 45 A side single, 43078, US; EP in Portugal, CBS 6195, 1964. English lyrics were written by American songwriter Vaughn Horton.
- Marie Laforêt – on the 1964 album Cantante Dagli Occhi D'oro in Italian with lyrics by Daniele Pace, Italy.
- Les Compagnons de la chanson as a Polydor 45 single in 1964 with German lyrics by Walter Rothenburg
- Leon Young String Chorale- "Drina" as a 45 single, UK, Columbia, 7236, 1964
- The Shadows – "March to Drina" on the EMI Records album Shadow Music, 1966
- Chet Atkins – "Drina" on the RCA Victor album From Nashville With Love, 1966
- Franca Siciliano as "Drina" on Silver Record, XP 616, backed with "Ma cos'hai?" in Italy in 1966
- Czech guitarist Karel Duba in 1966 on Supraphon
- Frankie Yankovic – "Drina (Little Soldier Boy)" on the CBS LP Saturday Night Polka Party, 1967
- James Last – on the Polydor LP Trumpet A Go Go, Vol. 3, Germany, 1968; James Last recorded the song in 1988 with Dutch flutist Berdien Stenberg, Flute Fiesta LP, Polydor 837 116-1
- The Nashville String Band featuring Chet Atkins and Homer and Jethro – "Drina" on the eponymous RCA Victor album, 1969
- South African version of "March on the Drina" as "Drina March" by Dan Hill and Sounds Electronic, '8' LP, 42 Great Hits Perfect For Dancing, on RPM Records, 1037 S, 1969
- Radomir Mihailović Točak – "Marš..." on the EP "Marš..." / "...na Drinu" (PGP RTB 1984), Yugoslavia
- Lill-Jorgen Petersen released the song in a trumpet arrangement on Columbia in Sweden.
- Laibach – "Mars on River Drina" on the album NATO (1994), Slovenia, released on the Mute label, based in London
- Bert Landers & Konrad Grewe – "Drina Marsch" from the album Schlager-Cocktail: Die 16 Spitzenschlager
- Horst Wende und sein Orchester – "Drina Marsch", Polydor 52 172, 7" 45 single, Germany, 1963; Roberto Delgado, pseudonym of Horst Wende, released as 45 single with picture sleeve in Italy as by Roberto Delgado e la sua orchestra, "March to Drina", Polydor 52172
- Die Kirmesmusikanten – "Drina Marsch", 7" 45 single, RCA, Germany, 1975.
- Gunter Noris und die Big Band der Bundeswehr – WM-Parade, CBS 80218, Germany, 1974
- Arne Domnerus Sekstett – on the LP Ja, Vi Älskar, Zarepta ZA 36010, Norway, 1978
- South African organist Cherry Wainer – on the LP Musik im Blut, Discoton 75289, Germany; Hammond Organ: Light and Lively, double LP album, Polydor, 583 570, UK, 1964; Rhythmus im Blut LP, Polydor, 237 359, Germany, 1967; Cherry Wainer and Her Magic Hammond Organ LP, on Polydor, 236 036, 1967; Hammond Non Stop LP, Polydor Special 2418–188, 1969
- Henry Arland and Hans Bertram – "Drina Marsch (Mars na Drini)", or "Drina (In den Bergen singt der Wind)", on the LP Clarinet Fascination, Polydor, 2371 208, 1972
- Bob Kaper's The Beale Street Jazz Band – "Drina-March" b/w "Dominique", 45 picture sleeve single, RCA 47-9509, Dutch Amsterdam pressing.
- Fischer Choir, Fischer-Chöre, as "Drina-Marsch" on the Polydor album Das große Spiel, The Great Game, Polydor 2371 500, Germany, 1974. The orchestra was under the direction of Hans Bertram. This vocal version features German lyrics written by Walter Rothenburg
- Czech vocalist Karel Gott on the album Singet und freut euch des Lebens, as "Drina-Marsch" with lyrics by Bert Olden, Polydor, 2371695, 1976
- The Dutch band Boemerang recorded the song as "Drina Mars" on the various artists album 84 Heerlijke Hollandse Hittroeven released in 2001
- Bauernkapelle Mindersdorf – on the album In der Musikscheune, Tyrolis, Germany, 2008
- Captain Harp – on the LP Harmonica Highlights as "Drina-Marsch" as part of "Balkan Medley" by the Picca-Trio in an arrangement for harmonica, ZYX Music, 2010
- German trumpeter Walter Scholz on the 2012 collection Rosen nur für dich as "Drina"

== See also ==
- Tamo daleko
- Battle of Cer
- Serbian campaign

== Notes ==
=== Sources ===
- Anon. (22 February 2014). ""Марш на Дрину", од голготе до светске славе" ["March on the Drina", from Golgotha to world fame] (in Serbian). Radio Television of Serbia. Archived from the original on 8 December 2014.
- Clemens, Walter C. Jr. (2013). Complexity Science and World Affairs. Albany, New York: State University of New York Press. ISBN 978-1-4384-4901-2.
- Cohen, Roger (1998). Hearts Grown Brutal: Sagas of Sarajevo. New York City: Random House. ISBN 978-0-307-76635-9.
- Gordy, Eric D. (1999). Culture of Power in Serbia: Nationalism and the Destruction of Alternatives. University Park, Pennsylvania: Pennsylvania State University Press. ISBN 0-271-01958-1.
- Goulding, Daniel J. (2002). Liberated Cinema: The Yugoslav Experience, 1945–2001. Bloomington, Indiana: Indiana University Press. ISBN 0-253-34210-4.
- Hudson, Robert (2007). "Popular Music, Tradition and Serbian Nationalism". In Biddle, Ian; Knights, Vanessa (eds.). Music, National Identity and the Politics of Location: Between the Global and the Local. Burlington, Vermont: Ashgate Publishing. ISBN 978-0-75464-055-4.
- Mitrović, Andrej (2007). Serbia's Great War, 1914–1918. West Lafayette, Indiana: Purdue University Press. ISBN 978-1-55753-477-4.
- Pavlowitch, Stevan K. (2002). Serbia: The History of an Idea. New York City: New York University Press. ISBN 978-0-8147-6708-5.
- Samson, Jim (2013). Music in the Balkans. Leiden, Netherlands: Brill. ISBN 978-90-04-25038-3.
- "UN apologizes for Serb nationalist song ovation". The Seattle Times. 17 January 2013. Archived from the original on February 20, 2014.
- Slamnig, Silvija (21 January 2013). "Ja sam napisao Marš na Drinu" [I Wrote the March on the Drina]. Kurir (in Serbian).
- Strimple, Nick (2005). Choral Music in the Twentieth Century. Milwaukee, Wisconsin: Hal Leonard Corporation. ISBN 978-1-57467-122-3.
- Thompson, Mark (1999). Forging War: The Media in Serbia, Croatia, Bosnia and Hercegovina. Luton: University of Luton Press. ISBN 1-86020-552-6.
