= Tamo daleko =

Serbian patriotic song

Song
- Released: 1916
- Songwriter: Đorđe Marinković

Tamo daleko (Serbian Cyrillic: Тамо далеко; "There, Far Away", "Over There, Far Away" or "There, Afar") is a Serbian patriotic song which was composed in 1916 to commemorate the Serbian Army's retreat through Albania in World War I and during which it was devastated by hunger, disease and attacks by armed bands before regrouping on the Greek island of Corfu, where many more Serbian soldiers died. It revolves around the theme of loss and longing for a distant homeland.

Along with the other World War I patriotic song, March on the Drina, it became a powerful symbol of Serbian culture and national identity and remains popular amongst Serbs in the Balkans and the diaspora.

== Song ==
Tamo Daleko, as performed by a tamburica ensemble named Tamburaško Pevačko Društvo (Columbia Records, 1917)

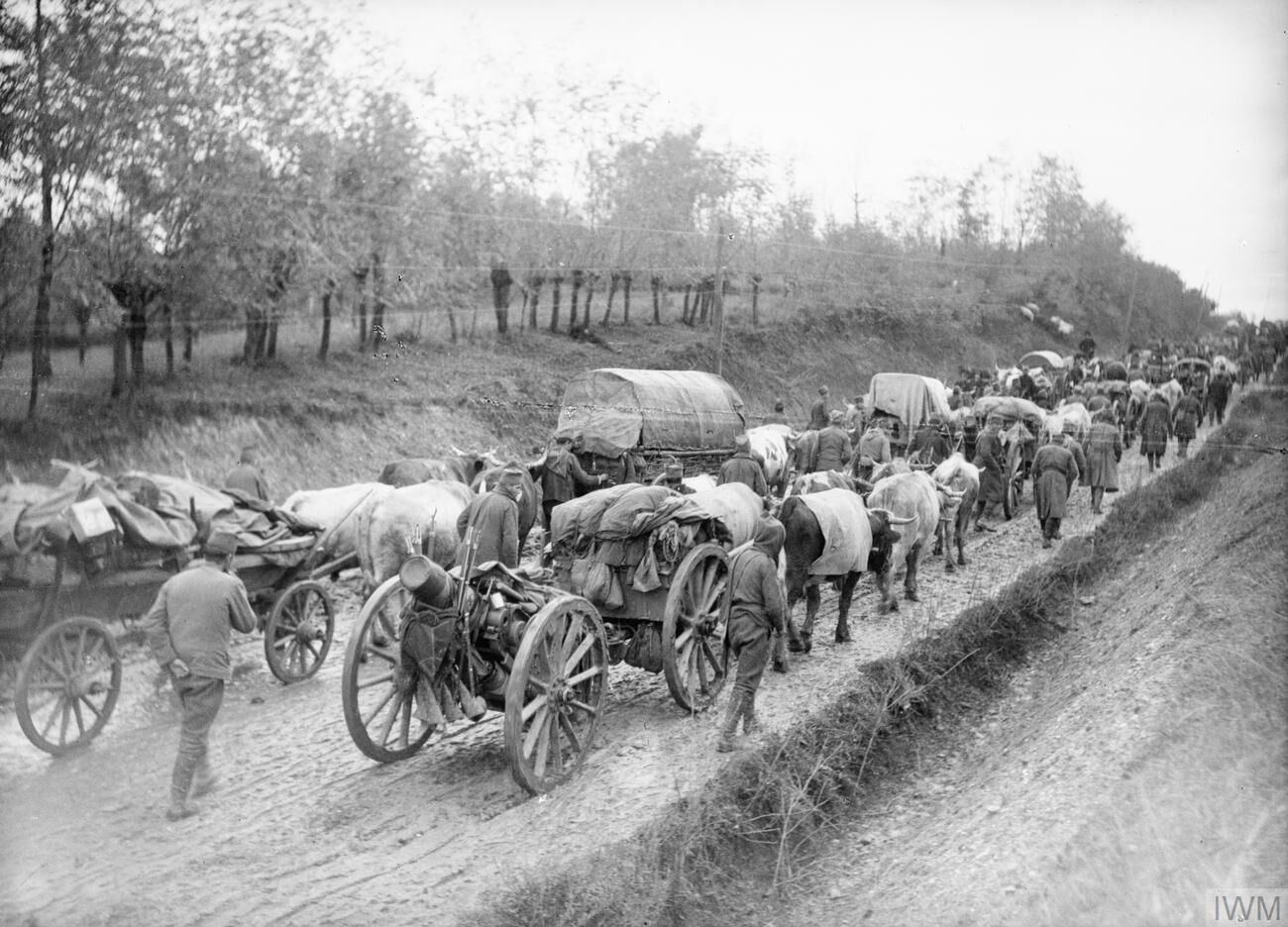
Serbian Army's retreat through the Albanian countryside

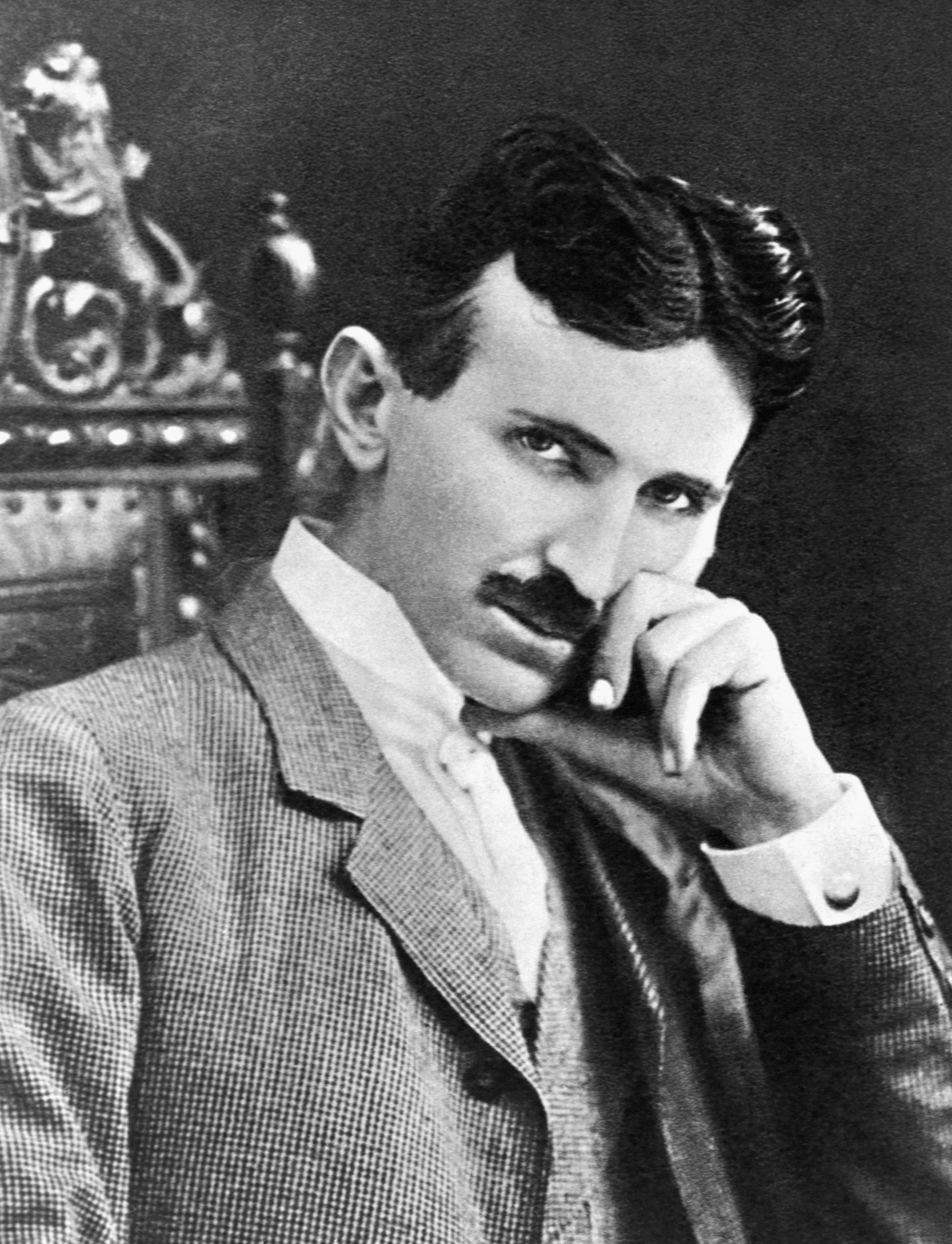
The song was played at the funeral of the Serbian inventor Nikola Tesla.

Song is played in triple metre and begins solemnly in a minor key before switching to the relative major of the dominant key in the third line of the first verse, symbolizing hope before returning to the tonic minor key from the beginning. The singer describes himself as being in the land "where the lemon tree blooms yellow" and looks "far away in the distance, where the sun shines brighter" to the village where he was born.

Historian Andrej Mitrović writes of the song's "nostalgic air [and] sorrowful melody". He argues that it provides great insight into the collective psychology and overall morale of the Serbian Army during the winter of 1915. He asserts that while the song is nostalgic, the basic idea is one of optimism. Journalist Roger Cohen describes Tamo daleko as "the lament of a people uprooted". The author Robert Hudson writes that "a sense of primordial identity, linked to family and nation, is embedded in [the] song, with father and son giving up their lives for the nation".

In April 1917, a Serbian American group named Tamburaško Pevačko Društvo made a recording of the song. Towards the end of World War I, the Serbian Army retook Serbia from Austria-Hungary and Bulgaria. Tamo daleko became very popular amongst Serbian émigrés. The song was even played at the funeral of the Serbian inventor Nikola Tesla in New York City in 1943. During the second half of the 20th century, Serbs in the diaspora began viewing it as a form of national anthem. In Titoist Yugoslavia, it was performed by Dušan Jakšić (1965), Nikola Vučetin Bata (1977) and others, but usually without the lines explicitly mentioning Serbia and Serbian Army because they evoked the resurgence of Serbian national feeling. From around 1985, those lyrics appear again in official releases of the song. (Note: Historian Sabrina P. Ramet contends that only some lyrics from the song were banned during Josip Broz Tito's regime.) In 1964, it was featured in the Bulgarian film The Peach Thief. In the early 1990s Radio Television of Serbia broadcast a documentary showing Serbian veterans returning to Corfu, with Tamo daleko playing gently in the background. Many variations of the song were sung by Bosnian Serb volunteers during the Bosnian War. The song remains popular amongst Serbs in the Balkans and the diaspora and several modern versions of it have been recorded, most notably by musician Goran Bregović.

== Authorship ==
The song was composed on Corfu but identity of the song's writer and composer remained a matter of dispute for many decades. Several individuals claimed to have been its original authors. Some contended that Milan Buzin, the chaplain of the Serbian Army's Drina Division, had composed and written the song. Others claimed that Dimitrije Marić, the surgeon of the Third field hospital of the Serbian Army's Šumadija Division, was the composer. Mihailo Zastavniković, a teacher from Negotin, was also rumoured to have been the original composer and writer and had even published one version of the song in 1926.

In 2008, historian Ranko Jakovljević discovered that Đorđe Marinković, an amateur musician from the village of Korbovo near Kladovo, was the song's original writer and composer. He composed Tamo daleko in Corfu in 1916 and moved to Paris after World War I, where he secured the authorship rights to the song in 1922. He lived in relative obscurity until his death in 1977.

== Lyrics ==
There are multiple versions of Tamo daleko in existence, most of which end with the line "long live Serbia!". During World War II the Communist-led Yugoslav Partisans also sung a version of the song, dedicated to the Yugoslav People's Army and Josip Broz Tito.

A common version goes as follows:

The latest English version was provided in 2026, by a librarian from Niš, Andrijana Stojanović

Serbian

Тамо далеко, далеко од мора,
Тамо је село моје, тамо је Србија.
Тамо је село моје, тамо је Србија.

Тамо далеко, где цвета лимун жут,
Тамо је српској војсци једини био пут.
Тамо је српској војсци једини био пут.

Тамо далеко, где цвета бели крин,
Тамо су животе дали заједно отац и син.
Тамо су животе дали заједно отац и син.

Тамо где тиха путује Морава,
Тамо ми икона оста, и моја крсна слава.
Тамо ми икона оста, и моја крсна слава.

Тамо где Тимок поздравља Вељков град,
Тамо ми спалише цркву, у којој венчах се млад.
Тамо ми спалише цркву, у којој венчах се млад.

Без отаџбине, на Крфу живех ја,
Али сам поносно клиц'о, Живела Србија!
Али сам поносно клиц'о, Живела Србија!

Serbian Latin

Tamo daleko, daleko od mora,
Tamo je selo moje, tamo je Srbija.
Tamo je selo moje, tamo je Srbija.

Tamo daleko, gde cveta limun žut,
Tamo je srpskoj vojsci jedini bio put.
Tamo je srpskoj vojsci jedini bio put.

Tamo daleko, gde cveta beli krin,
Tamo su živote dali zajedno otac i sin.
Tamo su živote dali zajedno otac i sin.

Tamo gde tiha putuje Morava,
Tamo mi ikona osta, i moja krsna slava.
Tamo mi ikona osta, i moja krsna slava.

Tamo gde Timok pozdravlja Veljkov grad,
Tamo mi spališe crkvu, u kojoj venčah se mlad.
Tamo mi spališe crkvu, u kojoj venčah se mlad.

Bez otadžbine, na Krfu živeh ja,
Ali sam ponosno klic'o, Živela Srbija!
Ali sam ponosno klic'o, Živela Srbija!

English

There, far away, away from deep blue sea
Lies my beloved Serbia, that’s home for you and for me
Lies my beloved Serbia, that’s home for you and for me

There, far away, where lemons shine like gold
For our Serbian army that was the only road
For our Serbian army that was the only road

There, far away, where white lillies bloom
Together father and only son met their horrible doom
Together father and only son met their horrible doom

There, where Morava travels ever so quaint
My icon forever stayed, and our family saint
My icon forever stayed, and our family saint

There, where rivers sing with a heavenly sound
The church I was married in was burnt to the ground
The church I was married in was burnt to the ground

Without the fatherland, so lonely I have felt
But with pride I sing mightily, Serbia has never knelt!
But with pride I sing mightily, Serbia has never knelt!

== See also ==
- March on the Drina

== Covers ==
- Dort in der Ferne by Eugen Cicero
