= Honour Unit (Republika Srpska) =

- Почасна јединица
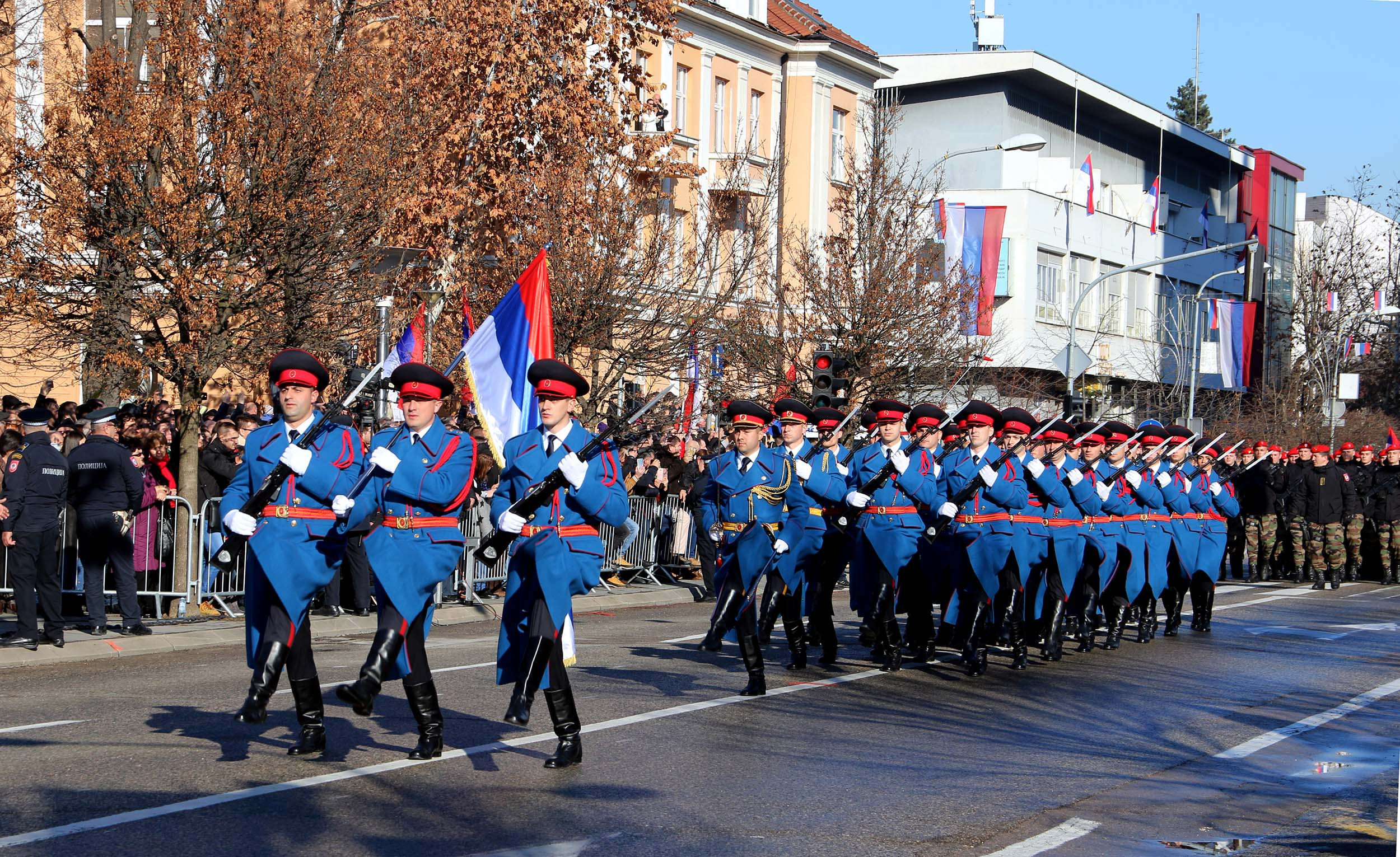
- Honour Unit as flag company during Republic Day parade 2019
- Active: 2002–present
- Country: Republika Srpska
- Branch: Ministry of Interior of Republika Srpska
- Type: Ceremonial guard
- Role: Ceremonies (lay of wreath), parade (as flag company), guard, rapports
- Size: 50
- Ceremonial rifle: stylized Zastava M59/66

Commanders
- Current commander: Vitomir Petričević

Insignia
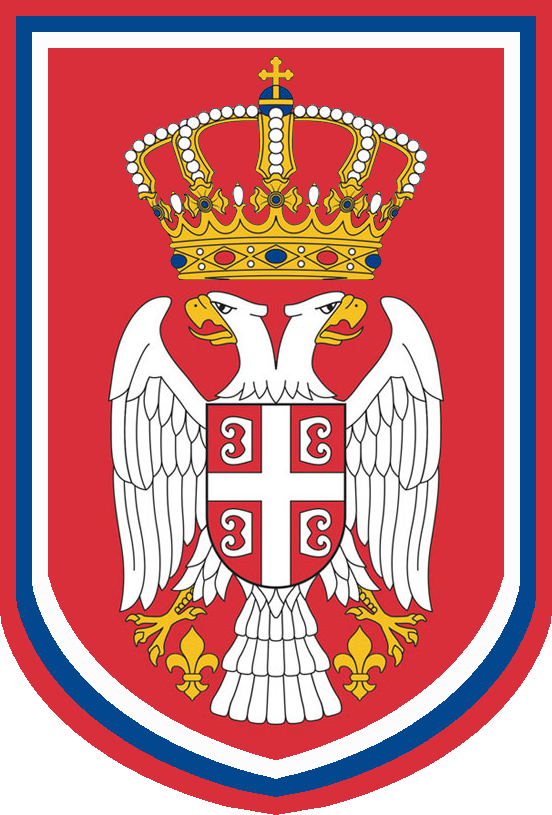
- Right arm patch

The Honour Unit of Ministry of Interior of Republika Srpska (Serbian: Почасна јединица Министарства унутрашњих послова Републике Српске, Počasna jedinica Ministarstva unutrašnjih poslova Republike Srpske) is a ceremonial unit of the Ministry of Interior of Republika Srpska.

The unit is formed of police officers of Police administration Banja Luka and Administration for protection of persons and objects. On Republic Day first time is presented new ceremonial uniform with combined elements of Russian military uniform and uniform of Serbian Guards Unit which replaced ordinary ceremonial uniform of police. Usually it is on sight with Police Band.

== Equipment ==
Honour Unit members (except for the commander) have black stylized Zastava M59/66 PAP semi-automatic rifles with engraved emblem of police and the Seal of Republika Srpska on butt. The Commander has the ceremonial officer saber on which is engraved the text: "Не вади ме без повода, не враћај ме без части!" (translit. Ne vadi me bez povoda, ne vraćaj me bez časti!, on English: Don't pull me out without a reason, don't bring me back without the honour!).

== History ==
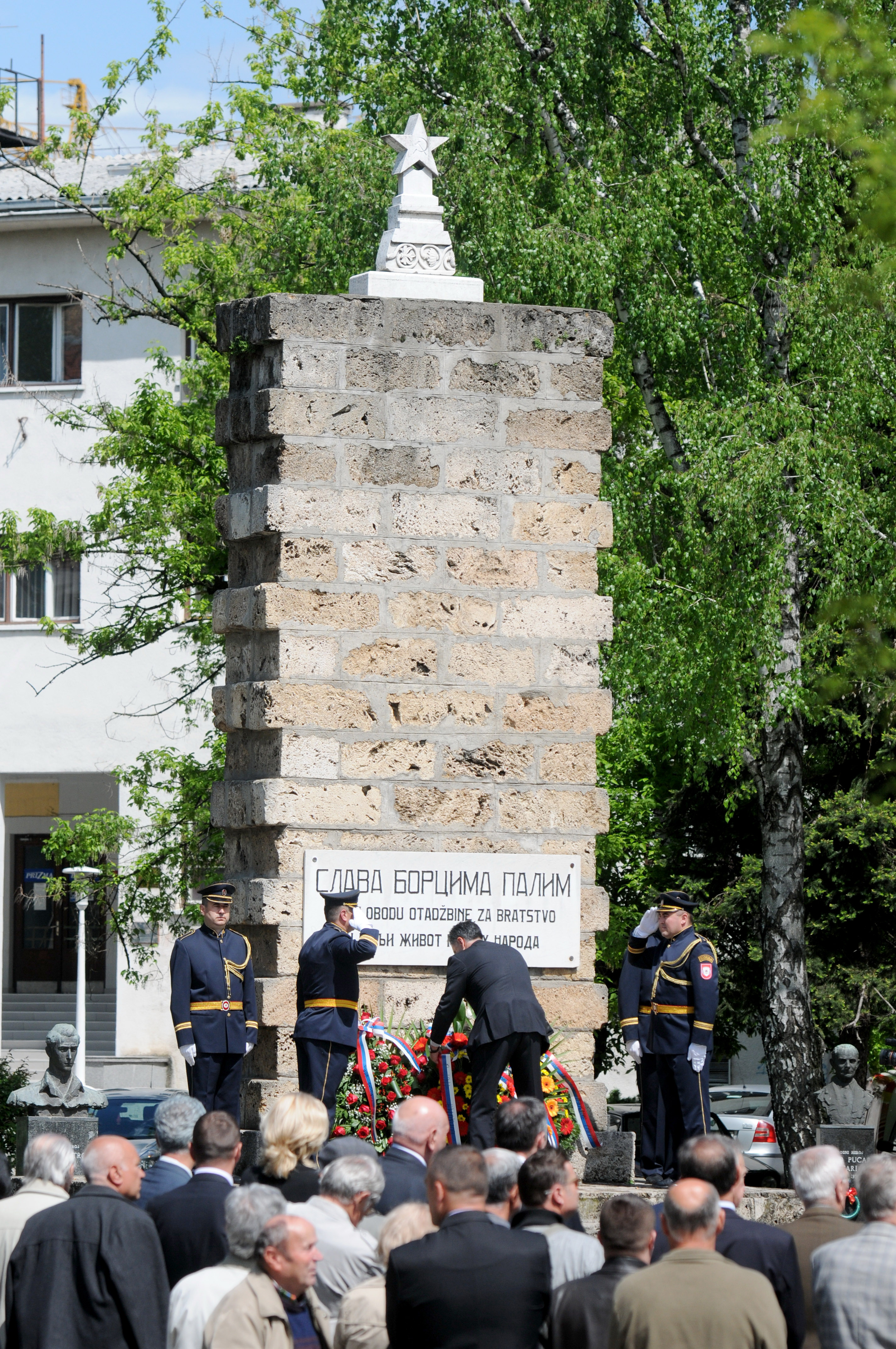
Members of Honour Unit in former uniforms during laying of wreath on Monument to the fallen fighters in WWII near "Bosna" Hotel in Banja Luka

Unit was formed in 2002, when it was seen that one unit of this type is necessary for the Ministry of Interior and for protocol needs of this institution. At first, the unit had only 8 members for guards purpose only, because there wasn't any need for real honour guard. One of the police officers was chosen to take the role of commander of unit. Their uniform was as same as uniform of high-ranked police officers. Later, the unit numbered 50 members which stayed till today. In first years of existence, unit was prepared to participate on every important day for Republika Srpska. Before new form of this unit, number of members was decreased to 23 police officers because of new police structure. When it was seen by Administration for protection of persons and objects, which was obligated about the unit, but before known as Unit for protection persons and objects, that number of 23 police officers is not sufficient for this kind of unit, then started new selection plan. From 60 police officers and 10 female police officers, final number was 50 police officers which became members of new honour unit. In that number of 50 officers is 45 male and 5 female officers. After selection, unit was prepared and trained for future needs, mainly drill commands and step. Also, Ministry of Interior started obtaining semi-automatic rifles, new uniforms and officer saber. Everything was later regulated by law. Use of unit is regulated by Instructions for use of Honour Unit of the Ministry of Interior of Republika Srpska.

== Role and commanders ==
Unit's main role is celebration of important days of Republika Srpska and the Ministry of Interior. Those days are Republic Day, Day of the Police of Republika Srpska, slava of the Ministry of Interior and so on. Usually duties of unit are rapports, guard in front of buildings of republic importance (Palace of the Republic) or on time when is meeting between two heads of states, from which one is from Republika Srpska, honours, inaugurations and laying of wreaths.

From the establishment of unit till today, Honour Unit of the Ministry of Interior had three commanders:

- Božidar Zorić (2004–2013)
- Branislav Martić (2013–2015)
- Vitomir Petričević (2015–present)

== Gallery ==
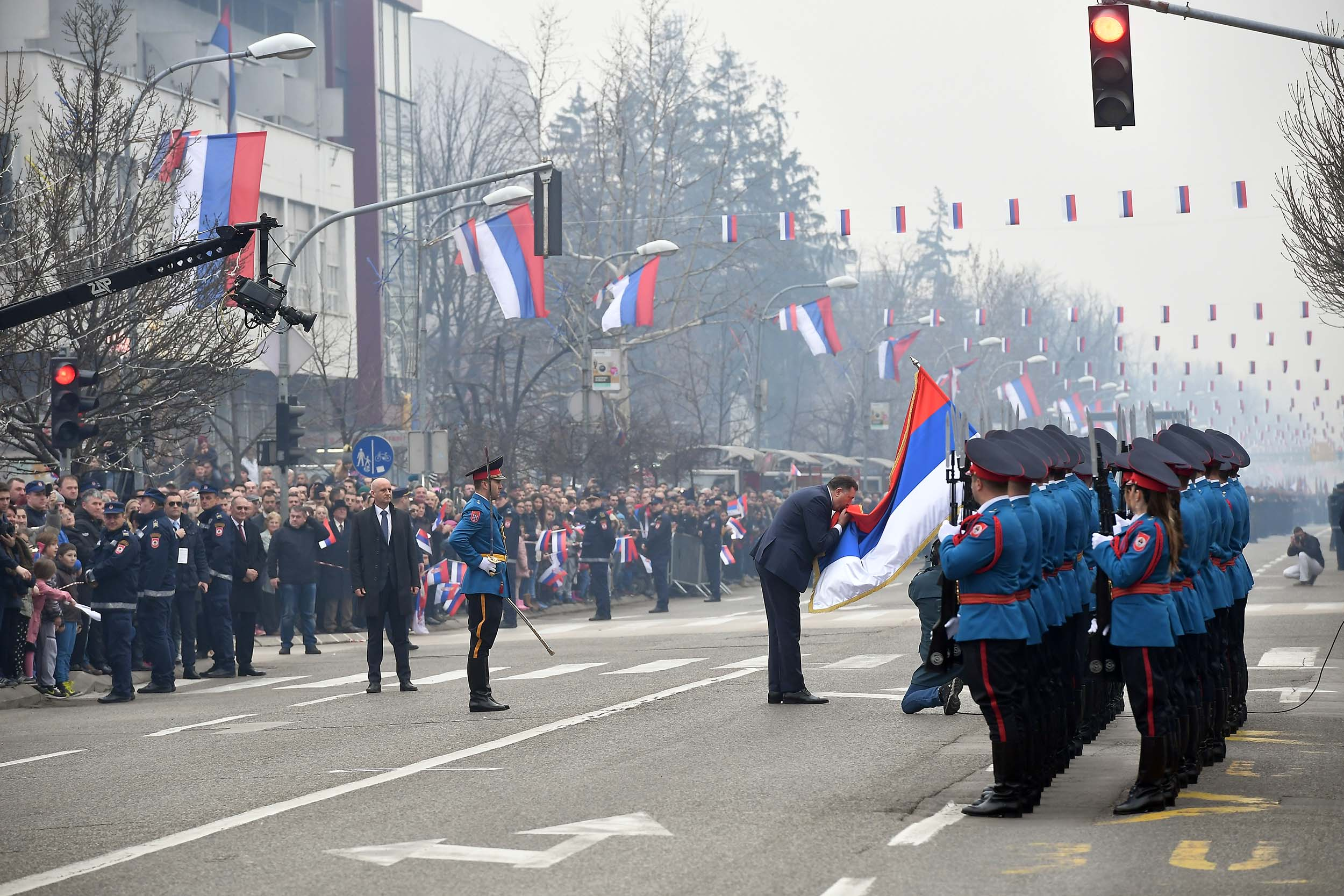
Members of Honour Unit with commandeer Vitomir Petričević presenting the flag of Republika Srpska to former president Milorad Dodik

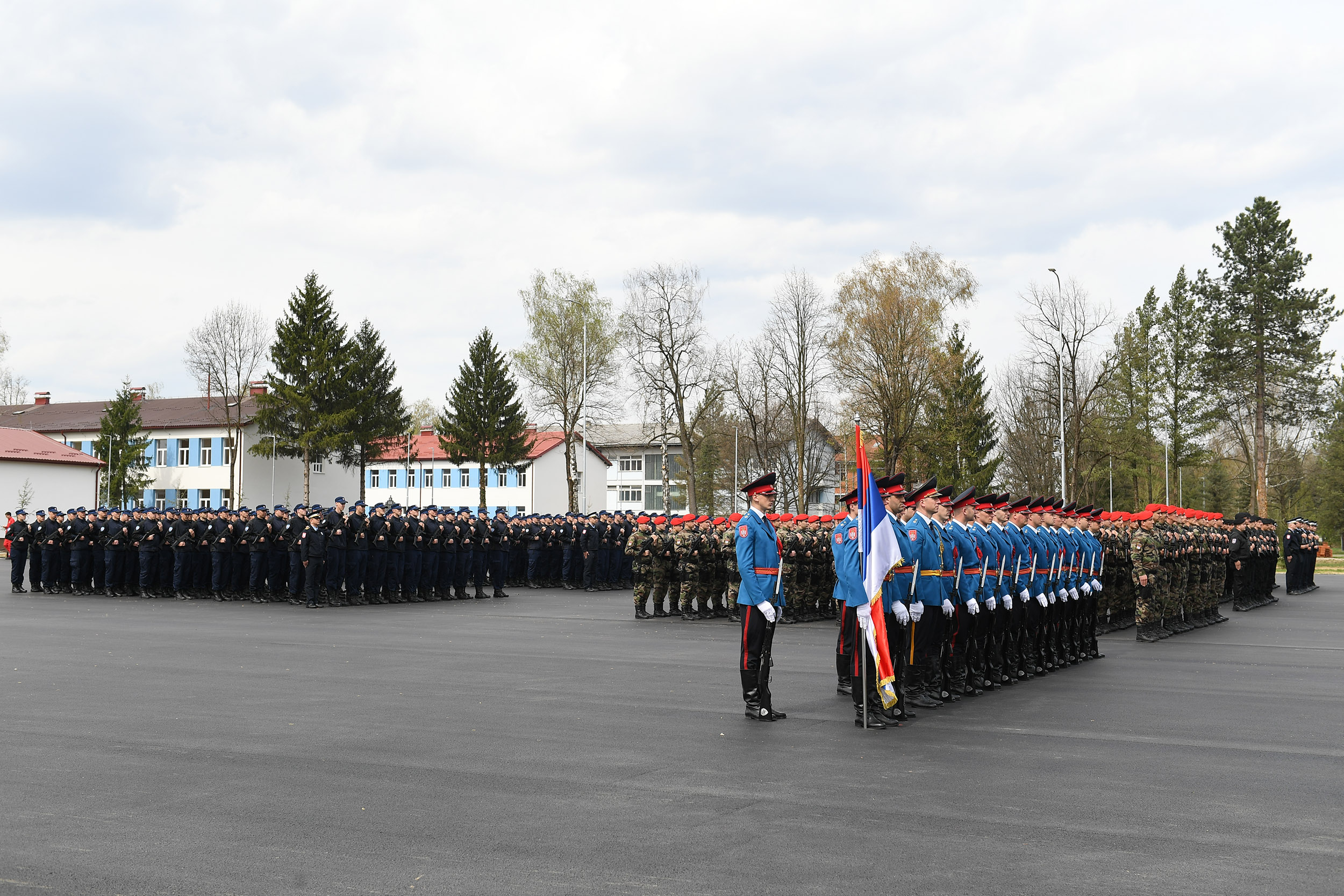
Honour Unit on celebration of the 2019 Day of Police

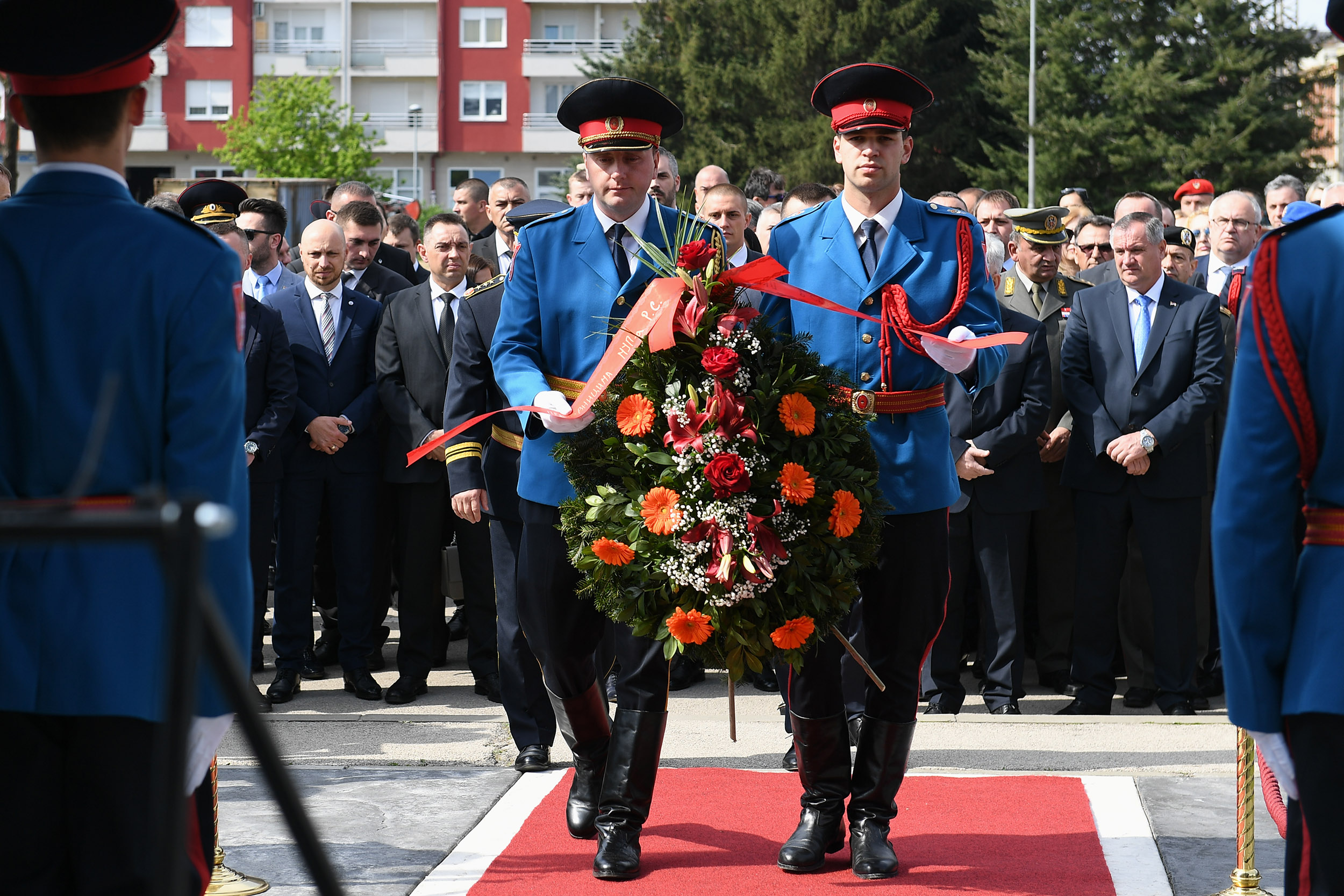
Two officers of the Honour Unit during ceremony of the laying of wreath

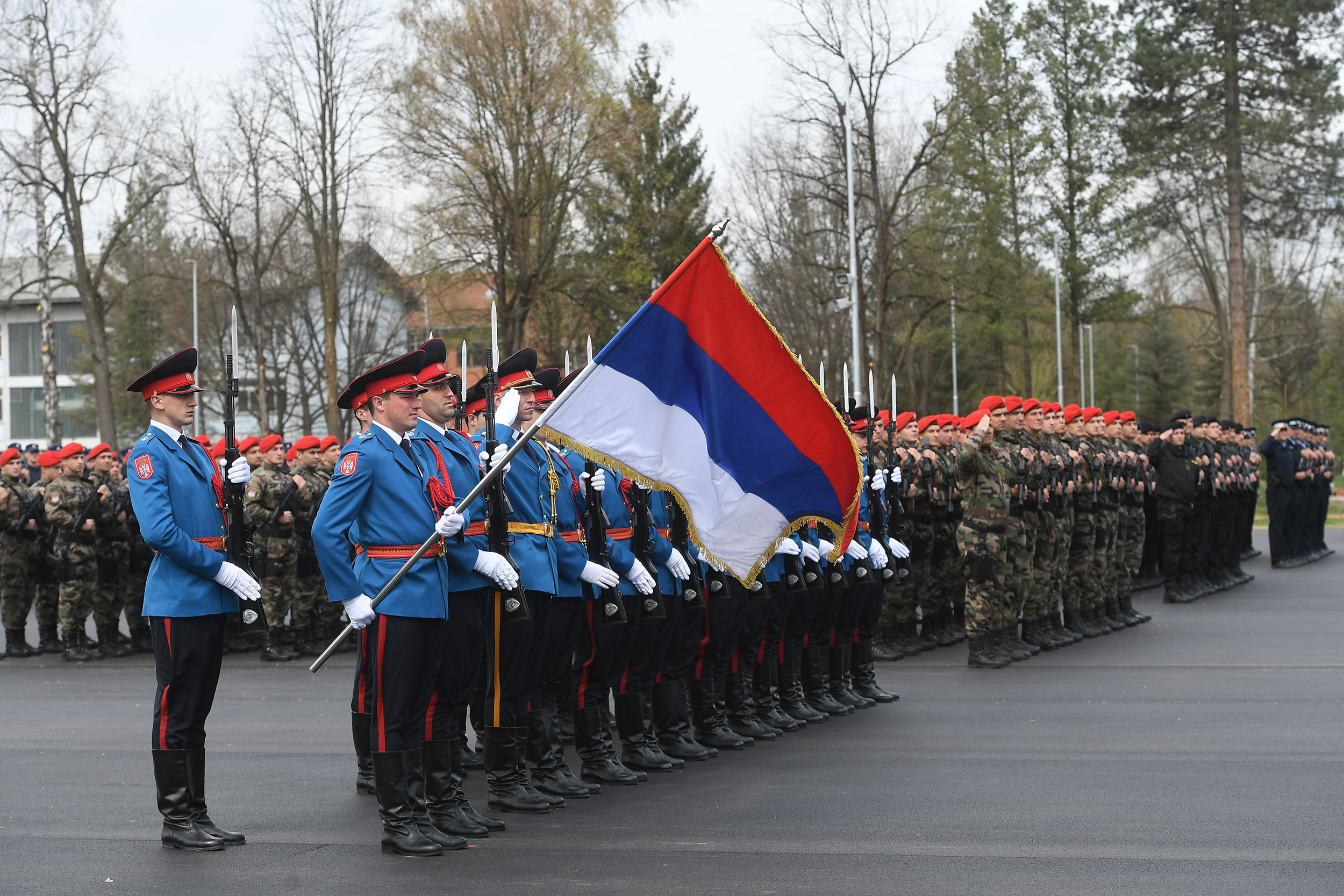
Honour Unit presenting the flag of Republika Srpska

== See also ==
- Ministry of Interior (Republika Srpska)
- Police of Republika Srpska
