= Greece–Serbia relations =

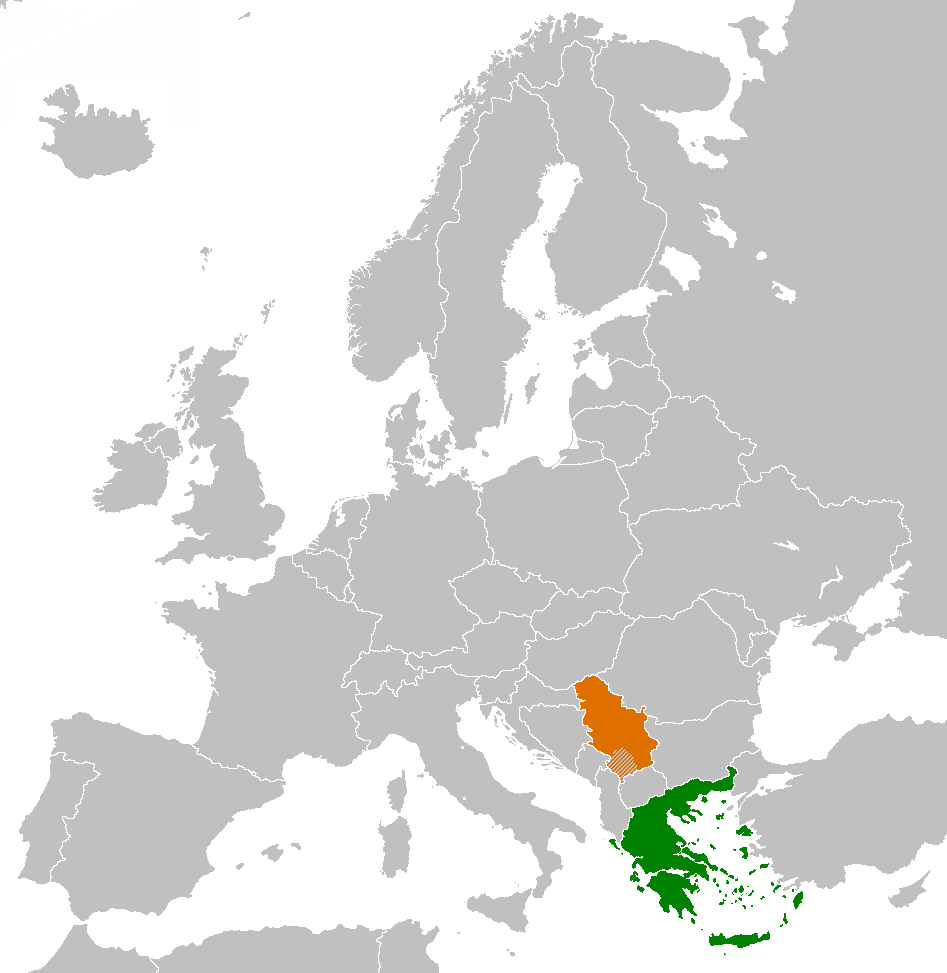
- Greece: Serbia

Greece and Serbia maintain diplomatic relations established in 1879. From 1918 to 2006, Greece maintained relations with the Kingdom of Yugoslavia, the Socialist Federal Republic of Yugoslavia (SFRY), and the Federal Republic of Yugoslavia (FRY) (later Serbia and Montenegro), of which Serbia is considered shared (SFRY) or sole (FRY) legal successor.

Greece and Serbia enjoy close diplomatic relations, which have traditionally been friendly due to cultural, religious and historical ties between the Serbs and Greeks.

== History ==
=== Middle Ages ===
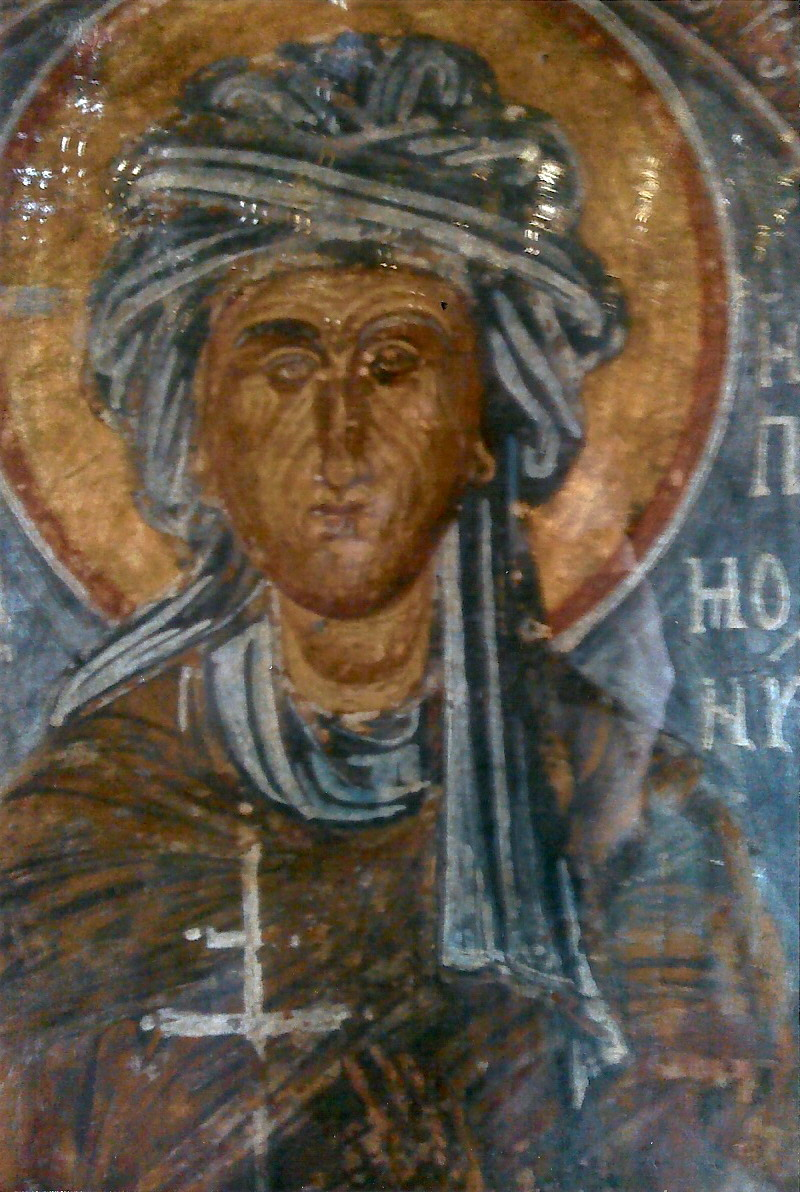
Helena Dragaš, a Serbian princess and Byzantine Empress consort, mother of John VIII and Constantine XI

During the Early Middle Ages, Principality of Serbia was a subject of the Byzantine Empire. The ethnogenesis of Serbs began in the Byzantine-Slavic environment, part of the wider Byzantine commonwealth. In the 11th and 12th centuries, the Serbs began fighting for independence, revolting against the Byzantines. In the following centuries, Serbia's independence was recognized by the Byzantines, and the two were mostly in friendly relations. The Serbs aided the Byzantines at the Battle of Sirmium in 1167 and Battle of Gallipoli in 1312. Most of the Serbian queen consorts were Byzantine women (such as Eudokia Angelina, Simonida, Maria Palaiologina, Irene Kantakouzene, Helena Palaiologina). Manuel I of Constantinople recognized Sava as the first Archbishop of the Serbs. Hilandar on Mount Athos became one of the most important cultural and religious centres of the Serbian people. Some Byzantine families found refuge in Serbia at the end of the 14th and early 15th century, following Ottoman conquests, such as the Angeloi and Kantakouzenos; notable statesmen in the Serbian Despotate of Greek origin include Janja Kantakouzenos, Dimitrije Kantakuzin and Mihailo Anđelović. The two last Byzantine Emperors were of Serbian maternal descent.

The Serbs were greatly influenced by the Hellenic culture of the Byzantine Empire, particularly under the reign of Serbian emperor Stefan Dušan. Dušan, who had himself crowned as "Emperor of Serbs and Greeks," made both Serbian and Greek the official languages of his empire, wrote charters and signed in Greek, and adopted Eastern Roman law as the foundations of his empire. He sought to synthesize the Byzantine Empire into a Serbian-Greek empire. Dušan, therefore, "took pains to woo the Greek inhabitants of those provinces [that he had acquired in Macedonia and northern Greece]. His code of law, or Zakonik, proclaimed the equality of Serbs and Greeks in all his dominions and confirmed the privileges bestowed on Greek cities by Byzantine Emperors of the past whom Dušan was pleased to regard as his imperial predecessors. His administrators were adorned with the Byzantine titles of Despot, Caesar and sebastokrator and his court was a model of that in Constantinople. He minted a silver coinage in the Byzantine style; and churches and monasteries in the Slav as well as the Greek provinces of his empire were decorated by artists of the best Byzantine school."

=== 19th century ===
During the First Serbian Uprising, the Serbian rebels were joined by Greeks and Greek-Aromanians, among others, with notable examples being fighter Giorgakis Olympios, diplomat Petar Ičko, secretary Naum Krnar, fighter Konda Bimbaša, and others. Greek armatolos Nikotsaras (d. 1807) planned to cross Mount Olympos to join the Serbian rebels. Military cooperation between the two nations was forged in the semi-autonomous Danubian Principalities, which were governed mostly by Phanariote Greek voivodes. There are indications that communication and cooperation between Serbs and Greeks of the Greek mainland had also been established early. For example, in 1806 the French consul in Thessaloniki reported that "the Turks are very furious against the Greeks because of their communications with the Serbs". It was reported that many Slav and Greek peasants were arrested suspected of aiding the Serbian rebels. The klephts and armatoloi were encouraged by the Serbian rebels and Russian actions. The Serbian rebels were important allies to the Greeks; after the suppression of the First Uprising, Karađorđe fled to Bessarabia, where he joined the Greek national liberation movement Filiki Eteria, becoming an active member. The Greeks were primarily interested in using the Serbian lands as base for Greek operations. Miloš Obrenović, the leader of the Second Serbian Uprising 1815–17 was fully uncooperative. The first historian of the Serbian Revolution was a Greek, Triantafillos Doukas. Many Serbs joined the Greek War of Independence, such as Hadži-Prodan and Vasos Mavrovouniotis.

Dimitrios Karatasos sought to establish a Greek-Serbian alliance in 1861, but died traveling to Belgrade. Lambros Koutsonikas, a Greek veteran and historian, dreamt in 1863 of a Greek–Serbian federation of "two sisters".

The Treaty of Vöslau, signed between Greece and Serbia in 1867, bound the two countries in an alliance.

=== Balkan Wars ===
In the First Balkan War, Greece, Serbia, Montenegro and Bulgaria (Balkan League) defeated the Ottoman Empire and divided the former territories of European Turkey among themselves. The division of the geographical area of Macedonia became a major point of contention among the allies. Greece had captured Thessaloniki and much of western Macedonia, while Serbia had captured most of northern Macedonia, both areas also coveted by Bulgaria.

In June 1913 Serbia and Greece signed a defensive pact opposing Bulgaria's expansionist goals. Eventually on 16 June of the same year Bulgaria attacked both countries, starting the Second Balkan War. Being decisively defeated by the Greeks in the Battle of Kilkis-Lahanas and by the Serbs in the Battle of Bregalnica, Bulgaria retreated into defensive positions until Romania entered the war by attacking Bulgaria and threatening Sofia, resulting in the latter's defeat. Greece and Serbia found themselves being the winner parties by having successfully fought the war side by side.

=== World War I ===
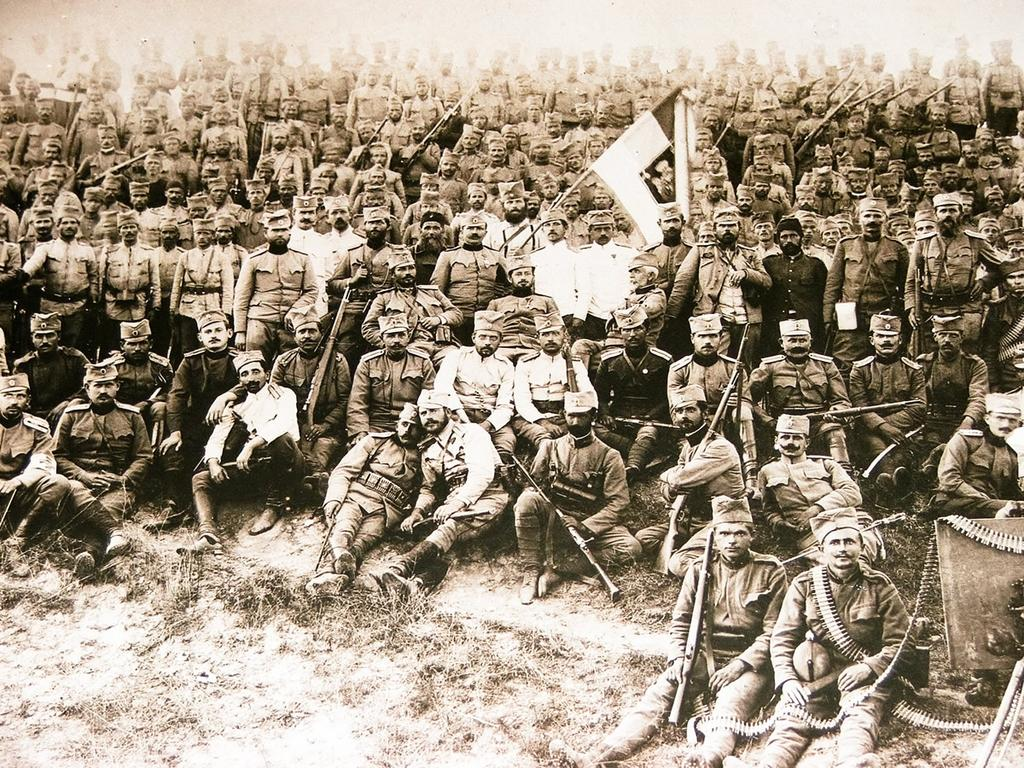
Serbian soldiers in Corfu, 1916

Despite its defensive alliance with Serbia, Greece remained neutral in the early part of the World War I, due to the dissension between Prime Minister Eleftherios Venizelos, who was pro-Entente and favoured entering the war, and King Constantine I, who was pro-German and favoured neutrality. The resulting National Schism was resolved only in 1917, when Constantine was forcibly deposed by the Entente Powers and Greece entered the war under Venizelos.

Corfu served as a refuge for the Serbian Army that retreated there by the Entente forces ships from the homeland occupied by the Austrians and Bulgarians. During their stay, a large portion of Serbian soldiers died from exhaustion, food shortage, and different diseases. Most of their remains were buried at sea near the island of Vido, a small island at the mouth of Corfu port, and a monument of thanks to the Greek Nation has been erected at Vido by the grateful Serbs; consequently, the waters around Vido island are known by the Serbian people as the Blue Graveyard, after a poem written by Milutin Bojić.

=== World War II ===
In 1941, during the Helleno-Italian War, when Hitler demanded passage around the Kingdom of Yugoslavia to attack Greece, the Regent Prince Paul attempted to appease Hitler by offering a non-aggression pact but, ultimately, signed the Tripartite Pact that would allow German passage. In return, the Greek city of Thessaloniki was promised to Yugoslavia. Two days later the army, aided secretly by the UK and the USSR, overthrew the regime with the popular support of both the Serbian people. Although it is arguable that this had more to do with the Serbian anti-German sentiments rather than a love for Greece, the fact remains that the Serbian people still remembered Venizelos' response to Vienna's suggestion for Greece to attack and invade Serbia decades earlier: "Greece is too small a country to do such big malice". Despite the fact that the new Yugoslav government again tried to appease Hitler (given that the country was surrounded on three sides) with neutrality and promises of adhering to previous agreements, the Serbian people were enthusiastic in denouncing the Tripartite Pact and Serb crowds paraded the streets of Belgrade shouting slogans like "Better War than the Pact". Hitler was not pleased and, immediately following the coup had decided to invade Yugoslavia—no longer trusting their proclamations—and divide the Yugoslav territories of the Adriatic coast, Banat, and Macedonia between Italy, Hungary, and Bulgaria, respectively. After the fall of Yugoslavia, the Serbian people were punished with genocide by the pro-German Croatian Ustaše.

=== Yugoslav Wars ===
In 1992, the UN responded to Serbian offensives in Bosnia and Herzegovina by declaring a full embargo on trade with Serbia by all member nations. The sanctions placed Greece, which had recognized the independence of Bosnia and Herzegovina shortly after its declaration in 1992, in a difficult position. Serbia was an important trading partner with strong religious and historical ties to Greece, and Serbia had initially supported the Greek position on the Macedonia naming dispute. Beginning in 1992, the Konstantinos Mitsotakis and Andreas Papandreou governments, fearing that the Bosnian war would spread in a direction that would involve Turkey, Albania and Greece, undertook long series of peace-negotiations with Serbia's president, Slobodan Milošević, Bosnian Serb leader Radovan Karadžić, and the Bosnian government without results. Meanwhile, food, oil, and arms were reported moving from Greece into Serbia in violation of the UN embargo. Before, during, and after its 1994 presidency of the EU, Greece was the only EU nation to back the Serbian position that Serbian forces had entered Bosnian territory. In early 1994, Greece incurred the displeasure of its European allies by voting against NATO air strikes on Serbian positions. Greece also refused the use of its NATO air bases at Preveza Air Base on the Ionian Sea for such attacks and refused to supply Greek troops to the UN peacekeeping mission in Bosnia. In late 1994, after official talks with Milošević in Athens, Papandreou reiterated that the positions of Greece and Serbia on the Bosnia issue were virtually identical. According to University of Amsterdam professor C. Wiebes, the Hellenic National Intelligence Service (EYP) systematically sabotaged NATO operations in Bosnia and Herzegovina, in an attempt to aid Bosnian Serb. In his report for the Dutch government, Wiebes claims that during the summer of 1995 EYP leaked classified NATO military plans to the Serb Bosnian leadership, and often to General Ratko Mladić himself. Eventually, Wiebes states in the report, NATO allies ceased sharing NATO military plans with the Greek authorities. A dozen Greek volunteers, members of the Greek Volunteer Guard (ΕΕΦ), fought alongside the Serbs at Srebrenica. The Greek volunteers were motivated by the desire to support their "Orthodox brothers" in battle. They raised the Greek flag at Srebrenica after the fall of the town at Mladić's request, to honour "the brave Greeks fighting on our side."

The creation of the tripartite confederation of Serbia, Greece and North Macedonia was unofficially proposed by Slobodan Milošević in 1992. In 1994, Milošević invited Greek Prime Minister Andreas Papandreou to consider his 1992 confederation proposal. Papandreou characterized the idea as "a pioneering, interesting proposal" but noted that it had not yet been examined. Main opposition New Democracy party leader Miltiadis Evert, who had also met with Milošević, said that all Balkan countries should instead gain accession to the European Union. Political Spring party leader Antonis Samaras said that the proposal was "interesting but should be thoroughly examined." These proposals eventually failed to gain support among any faction in Greece.

Greece opposed the NATO bombing of Yugoslavia, being the only NATO member to condemn the actions and to openly express its disapproval, refusing to participate in the strikes. Several polls were conducted, one of which revealed that 94% of the Greek population were completely opposed to the bombing, with 85% believing NATO's motives were strategic and not humanitarian. Some 69% wanted US President Bill Clinton tried for war crimes, while 52% opposed the admittance of Kosovo Albanian refugees to Greece. During a C-SPAN discussion in 2005 with General Wesley Allen Clark, the commander of NATO during the Kosovo War and NATO bombings, it was revealed that several Greek non-governmental organizations were sending relief supplies in the midst of the bombing campaigns, which caused the bombing of certain targets more difficult, with the intention of the organizations being to forestall the military action by sending humanitarian aid to the Kosovo Serbs.

==== Greek humanitarian aid ====
Following the outbreak of Yugoslav Wars, Serbia and Bosnian Serbs received tremendous humanitarian aid from Greece and Cyprus, coming from all sectors of Greek society.

In 1993 the Hellenic Red Cross and the Red Cross of Serbia launched a program for Greek families to host Serbian children—especially those who were refugees, orphans, had lost family members during the wars, or came from poor families—was established in order to help children forget their hardships for a while and overcome psychological problems caused by the traumatic experiences they had lived through. In total, more than 2,000 Bosnian Serbian children have been hosted by Greek families by 1999.

In October 1995, a "peace train" carrying 10,000 tons of humanitarian aid consisting of clothing, pharmaceuticals, and food left Greece to aid Bosnian Serb refugees. This effort was organized by the committee that included prefectures, cities and municipalities from Northern Greece, both public and private companies. In December 1995, 70 tons of humanitarian aid were sent to the Bosnian Serbs in the town of Prijedor by the municipality of Neapoli. In February 1996, 200 tons of humanitarian aid gathered by the Athens Association of Greek-Serb Friendship arrived in Republika Srpska.

At the beginning of the NATO bombing in 1999, Greek businessman Stavros Vitalis organized departure of 250 Greeks for Belgrade in order to offer any kind of help they could to the Serb people. Among the 250 people were lawyers, doctors, and other professionals. Stavros Vitalis was reported as saying that they were on the side of the Serbs because they regarded them as friends and brothers. In April 1999, the municipality of Kalamaria collected 50 tons of humanitarian aid consisting of food and medicines. During that same month, representatives of the Athens-based Society of Greek-Serbian Friendship sent a 16-truck convoy of humanitarian aid consisting of food and medical supplies.

During his visit to Serbia in September 2001, Archbishop of Athens and All of Greece Christodoulos announced donation of the Church of Greece of 250 million drachmas. For all of his activities and assistance to the Serbian Orthodox Church and the Serbian people, Patriarch Pavle conferred the Order of St. Sava to Archbishop Christodoulos, saying that "The Greek Church has always sympathised with the troubles we have been in, rendering us support as well as aid". Likewise, Yugoslav President Vojislav Koštunica awarded Archbishop Christodoulos the highest state medal for the help of the Greek Church towards the Serbian people during the 1990s.

=== Recent period ===
Following the 2007 Greek forest fires, Serbia sent six M-18 Dromader and one Antonov An-2 firefighting planes, 6 firefighting all-terrain vehicles, 55 firefighters, and put specialized military units on alert in case they were needed to assist the Greek Army battling fires and clearing out the debris. According to the Ministry of Internal Affairs, over 300 Serbian firefighters signed up for Greece in less than an hour.

In August 2021 Serbia sent a special unit consisting of 37 firefighters and 3 helicopters to assist Greece in fighting against wildfire rampage.

== Political relations ==
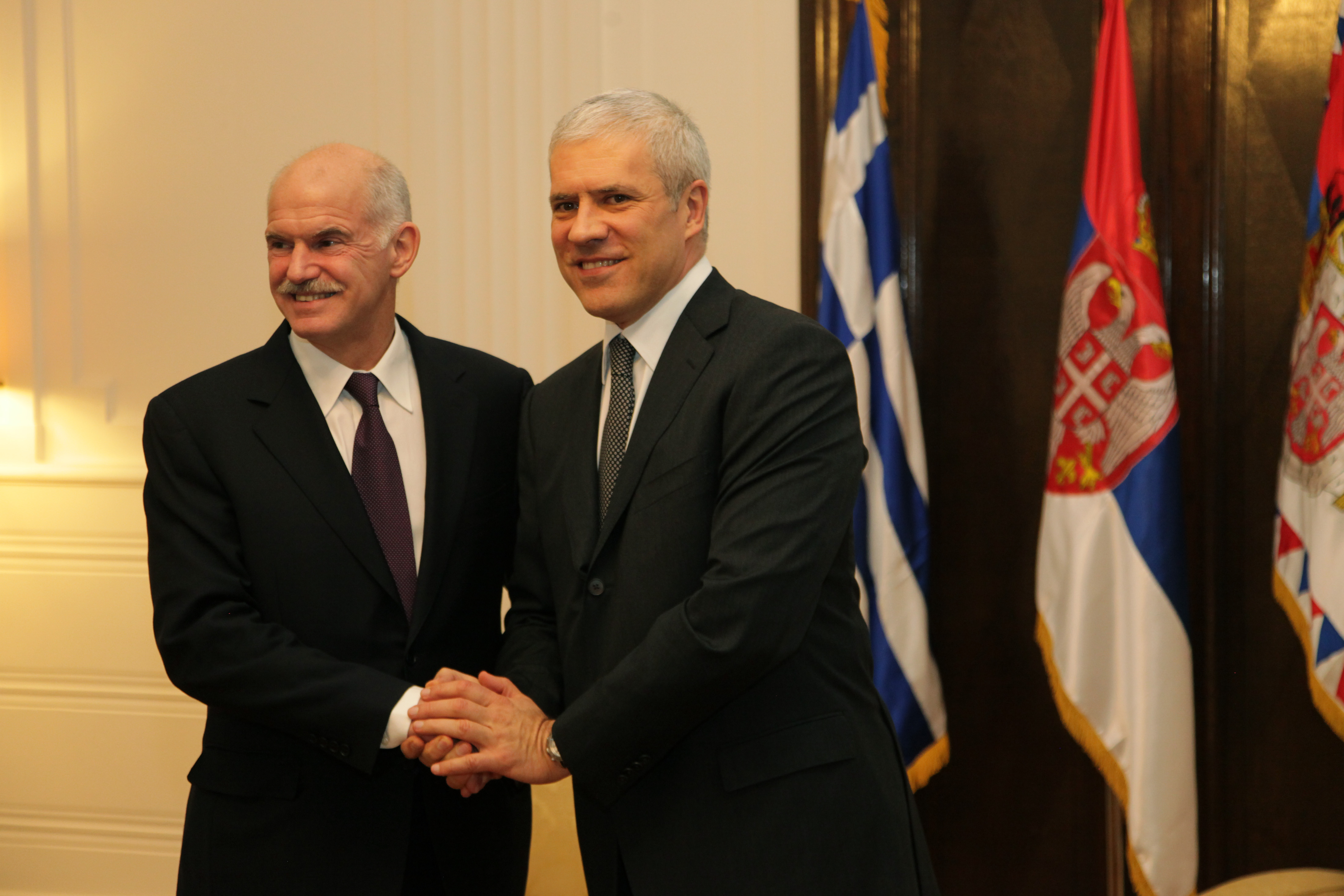
George Papandreou, Prime Minister of Greece, and Boris Tadić, President of Serbia, in Belgrade, 2010

The political relationship between the two countries is characterized by frequent high-level visits and a strategic partnership formalized in 2019 through the High-Level Cooperation Council, with sessions held in Thessaloniki in 2017, Belgrade in 2018, and Athens in 2019. Greece strongly supports Serbia’s EU accession, despite Serbia’s complex ties with Russia.

=== Greece's stance on Kosovo ===
Greece is one of five member states of the European Union (other being, Cyprus, Romania, Slovakia and Spain) that does not recognize unilateral declaration of independence of Kosovo and is actively opposing its membership in international organisations such as UNESCO and Interpol.

== Economic relations ==
Trade between two countries amounted to $856 million in 2023; Greek merchandise export to Serbia was over $523 million; Serbian exports were standing at $323 million.

Greek manufacturing companies present in Serbia include Titan Cement (cement manufacturing plant in Kosjerić), Hellenic Sugar Industry (sugar producing plants in Crvenka and Žabalj), and Alumil (aluminium profiles plant in Stara Pazova). HelleniQ Energy has the retail network of 59 filling stations in Serbia under the EKO brand. Greek toy retailer Jumbo is well-established on Serbian market.

Serbia is the 11th largest tourist market for Greece. Greece is a favorite holiday destination for Serbians due to its proximity, affordability, and cultural ties: over a million Serbian tourists spend their summer vacations in Greece annually, particularly in popular destinations of Northern Greece like Chalkidiki, the west coast of the Thermaic Gulf, and Thasos.

== Cultural relations ==
Hilandar, Serbian Orthodox monastery on Mount Athos, holds immense significance for Serbian culture. It was founded in 1198 and is considered a sacred site for Serbian Orthodoxy. Saint Sava’s campaign for the autocephaly of the Serbian Orthodox Church in 1219 is closely tied to Hilandar, where he was tonsured as a monk. The monastery has been a repository of Serbian cultural heritage, housing an extensive collection of medieval manuscripts, icons, and artifacts. Its library contains over a thousand manuscripts. These treasures preserved Serbian literature, language, and art during centuries of Ottoman rule when Serbia ceased to exist. Hilandar remains a pilgrimage site for Serbs, reinforcing national and religious identity.

Most Serbian cities and towns have streets named after Greek individuals or Greek toponyms. In downtown Belgrade there are streets named after Rigas Feraios and Eleftherios Venizelos, as well as Thessaloniki and Corfu streets. There are also monuments dedicated to Rigas Feraios and Eleftherios Venizelos in the very center of the city. The second largest Serbian city of Novi Sad is sometimes called "Serbian Athens" while Fruška Gora mountain, the site of 17 monasteries, is called the "Serbian Mount Athos".

In downtown Athens there is a street named after Serbian national hero Karađorđe, while many Greek towns have streets named after Vasos Mavrovouniotis, a Montenegrin Serb who fought in the Greek Revolution. There is a museum in Corfu called the "Serbian House", dedicated to the memory of the Serbian Army stay on the island in 1916, after the Great Retreat during the World War I. Nearby Vido island houses the mausloeum which houses the remnants of fallen Serbian soldiers. There is also a Serbian military cemetery at Zeitenlik, in Thessaloniki.

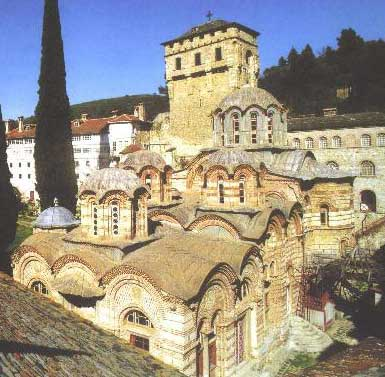
Hilandar, Serbian Orthodox monastery on Mount Athos

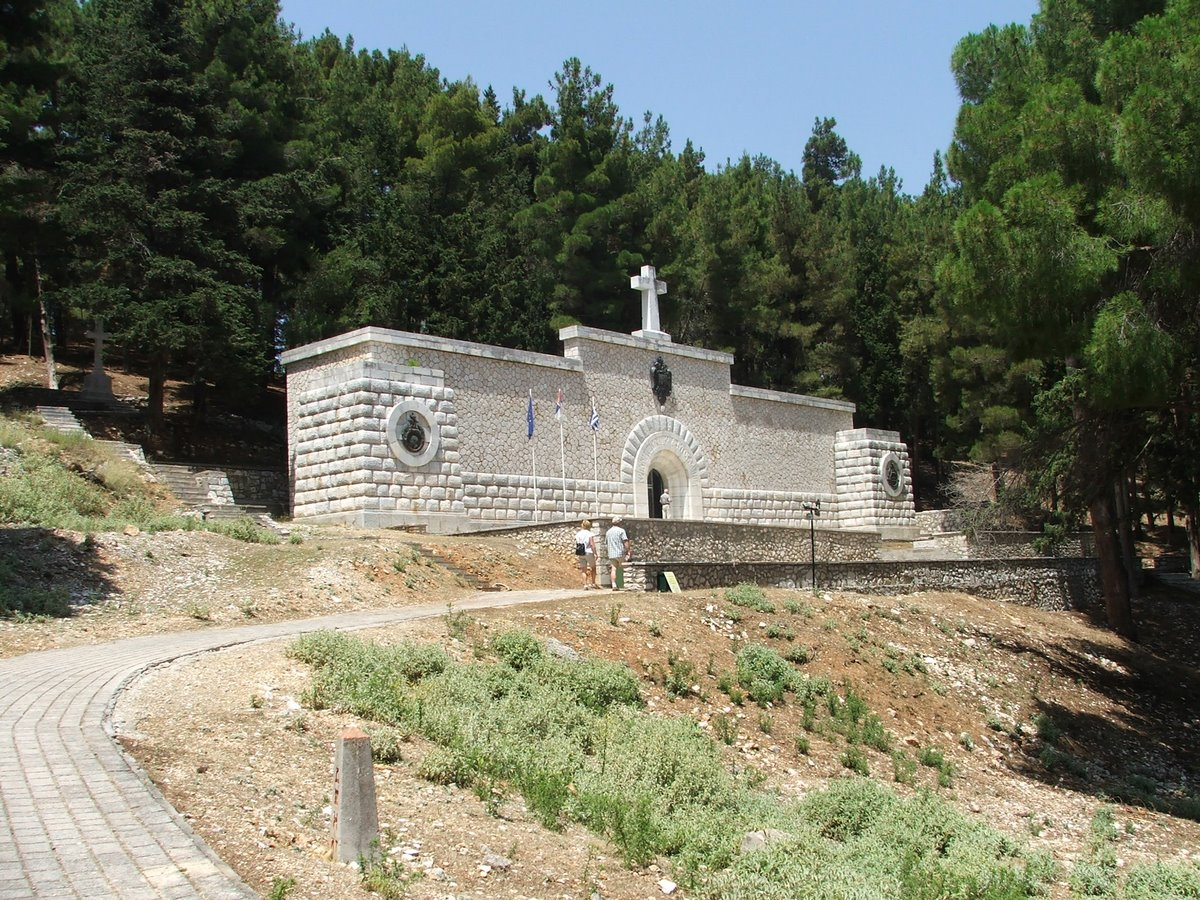
Serbian World War I Mausoleum at Vido Island

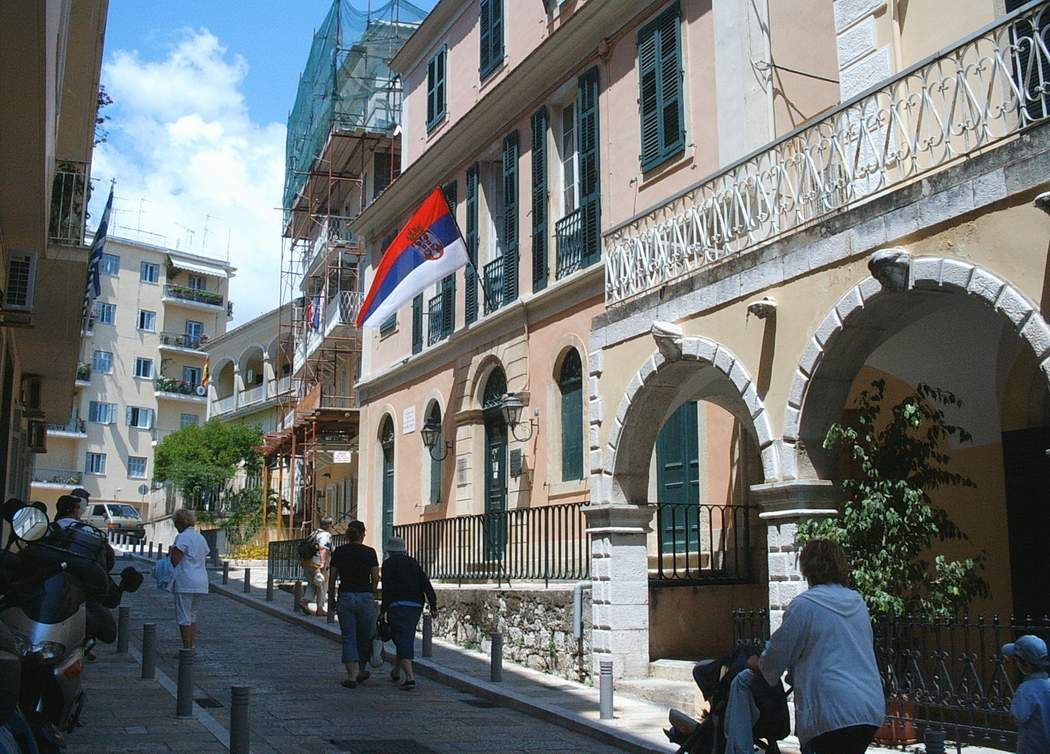
Serbian World War I Museum in Corfu

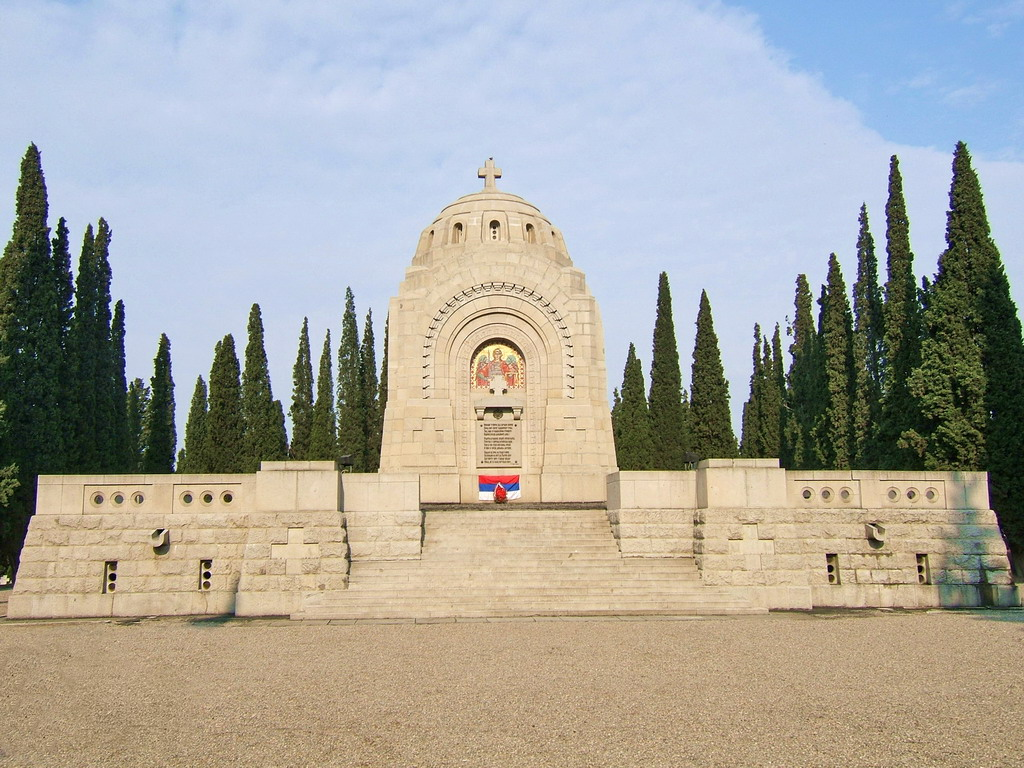
Serbian World War I Military Cemetery at Zeitenlik in Thessaloniki

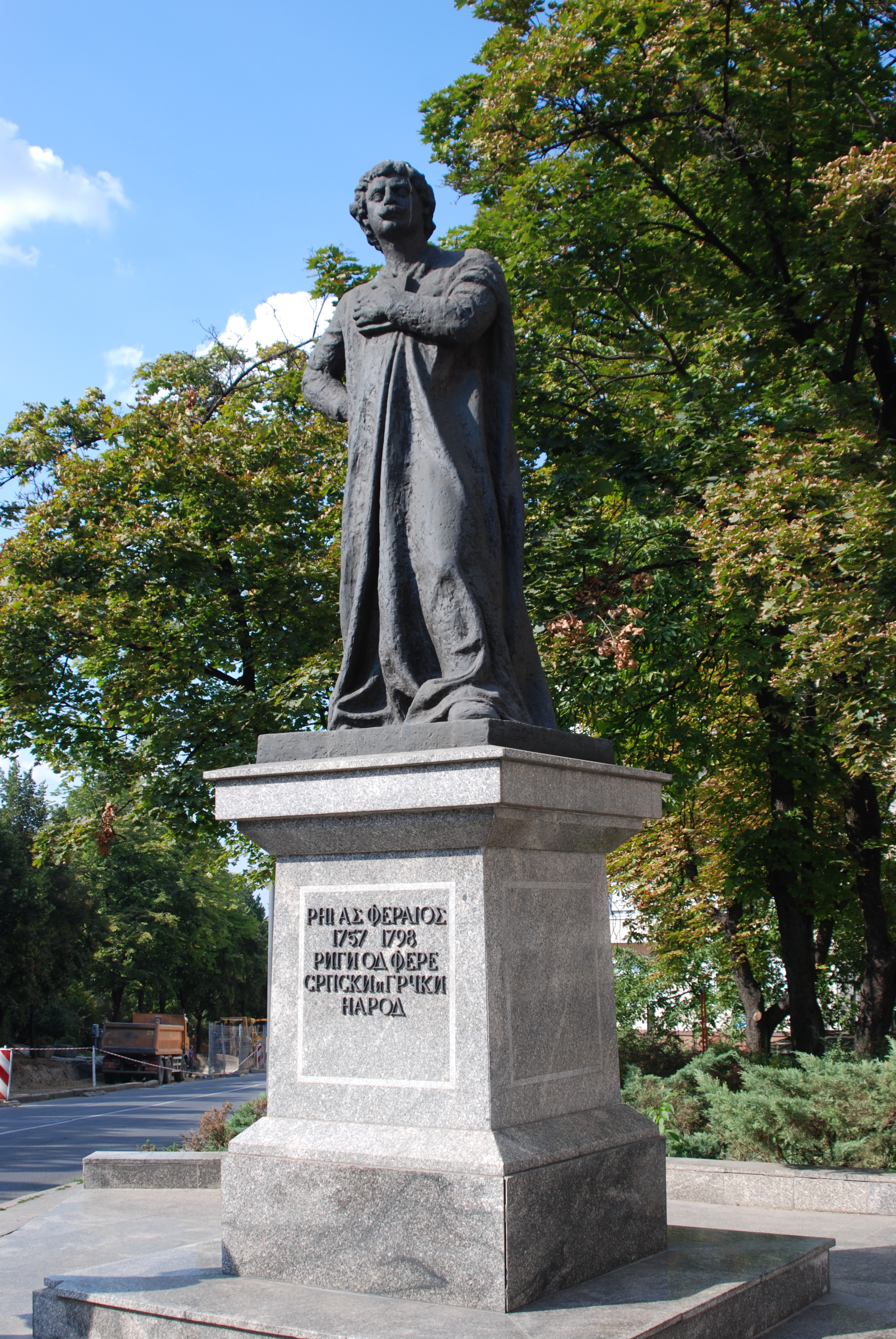
Statue of Rigas Feraios in Belgrade

== Greeks in Serbia ==
Greeks in Serbia are a recognized ethnic minority. According to data from the 2022 census, they number 690 people although estimation by the Association of Greeks in Serbia has the number of Serbs of Greek descent at 4,500 people.

== Serbs in Greece ==
Serbs in Greece are mainly first- or second-generation immigrants from Serbia. According to data from 2021 census, there were 2,456 Serbian citizens in Greece.

== Resident diplomatic missions ==
- Greece has an embassy in Belgrade.
- Serbia has an embassy in Athens and a consulate general in Thessaloniki.
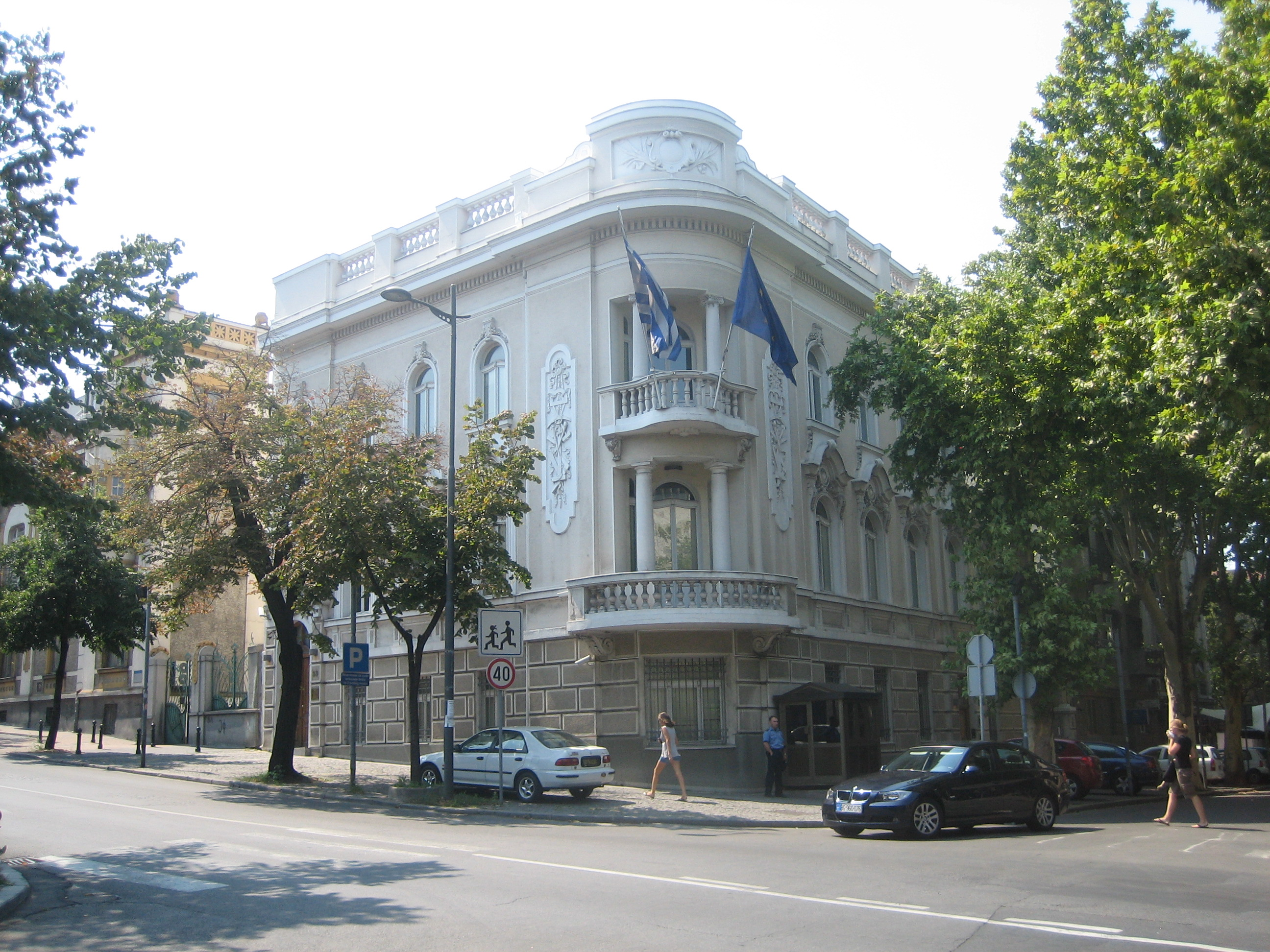
Embassy of Greece in Belgrade

== See also ==
- Foreign relations of Greece
- Foreign relations of Serbia
- Serbia–NATO relations
- Accession of Serbia to the EU
- Greece–Yugoslavia relations

== Annotations ==
1. It is also popularly known as the Greek-Serbian friendship (Greek: Ελληνοσερβική φιλία/Ellinoserviki filia, Serbian: српско-грчко пријатељство/srpsko-grčko prijateljstvo, "Serbian-Greek friendship"), or even Greek-Serbian brotherhood (српско-грчко братство), "Serbian-Greek brotherhood").

== Bibliography ==
- Vladan Georgevitch (1896). "Grčka i srpska prosveta". Beograd Schtampano u Dr. shtampariji i Kraljevine Srbije. (Public Domain)
- Slavenko Terzić; Slavko Gavrilović (1992). Srbija i Grčka: (1856-1903): borba za Balkan. Istorijski institut. ISBN 9788677430030.
- Đorđević, Vladan (1923). Srbija i Grčka: 1891-1893 : za istoriju srpske diplomacije pri kraju XIX veka. Srpska kraljevska akademija nauka i umetnosti. OCLC 4397035.
- Milošević, Miladin (1997). Srbija i Grčka: 1914-1918 : iz istorije diplomatskih odnosa. Zadužbina Nikola Pašić. OCLC 85851065.
- Kumanudi, A. J. (1907). Srbija i Grčka u XIX veku. Stanojević.
- Obolensky, Dimitri (1974) [1971]. The Byzantine Commonwealth: Eastern Europe, 500-1453. London: Cardinal. ISBN 9780351176449.
- Ostrogorsky, George (1956). History of the Byzantine State. Oxford: Basil Blackwell.
- Samardžić, Radovan (1982). Greek-Serbian Cooperation, 1830-1908: Collection of Reports from the Second Greek-Serbian Symposium, 1980. Serbian Academy of Science and Arts, Institute for Balkan Studies.
- Kaitē Rōmanou (2009). Serbian and Greek Art Music: A Patch to Western Music History. Intellect Books. ISBN 978-1-84150-278-6.
- Hidryma Meletōn Chersonēsu tu Haimu (Thessalonikē) (1991). Proceedings of the Fifth Greek-Serbian Symposium: 1. Serbia and Greece During the First World War. 2. The Ideas of the French Revolution, the Enlightenment and the Pre-Romantic Period in the Balkans, 1780-1830 : Organized by the Institute for Balkan Studies and the Serbian Academy of Sciences and Arts in Thessaloniki and Volos, 9-12 October 1987. Institute for Balkan Studies.
- Takis Michas (2002). Unholy Alliance: Greece and Milošević's Serbia. Texas A&M University Press. ISBN 978-1-58544-183-9.
- Mythistory in a Nationalist Age: A Comparative Analysis of Serbian and Greek Postmodern Fiction. 2007. ISBN 978-0-549-69949-1.
- Cooperation Between Greeks and Serbs During Their Struggles for Liberation, 1805-1830: L Greek-Serbian Symposium (7-10 November 1976) by the "Institute for the Balkan Studies" in Thessaloniki and Balkanoloski Institut Sanu" in Belgrade. Institute for Balkan Studies. 1979.
- Gordаna Blаgojević. "Institucionalizovаne humаnitаrne аkcije i etničkа distаncа na primeru Grkа i Srbа dаnas" (PDF). Glasnik Etnografskog instituta SANU. 58 (1). Archived from the original (PDF) on 4 March 2016.
- "GREEK-SERBIAN RELATIONS IN THE FIRST HALF OF THE 20th CENTURY". Balkan Studies. 45. Thessaloniki. 2004.
- Jelavich, Barbara (29 July 1983). History of the Balkans: Volume 1. Cambridge University Press. ISBN 978-0-521-25249-2.
- Kašić, Dušan Lj. (1971). "Грчки устанак и Срби, поводом прославе 150-годишњице устанка грчког народа" [The Greek insurrection and the Serbs] (PDF). Теолошки Погледи. IV (2). Свети Архијерејски Синод: 143–152.
- Kašić, Dušan Lj. (1974). "Грчко-српска црквена симбиоза у северној Далмацији од XV до XVIII века" (PDF). Теолошки Погледи. VII (4). Свети Архијерејски Синод: 259–280.
