= Dušan Jezdić =

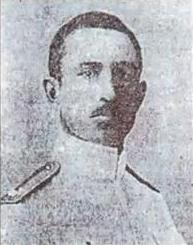
Portrait of Dushan Yezdich

Dušan Jezdić or Dushan Yezdich (Belgrade, Serbia, 22 December 1881 – Ionian Sea, near the island of Vido, Greece, 1917) was a Serbian Chetnik voivode who participated in the struggle for Old Serbia and Macedonia (1903–1912), the Balkan Wars and the First World War.

== Biography ==
Jezdić was born in Belgrade and educated at the prestigious Serbian Military Academy. He became a voivode after joining the Serbian Chetnik Organization in 1903. Until 1917 he participated in the wars as a lieutenant colonel.

He was buried at sea with hundreds of others who survived the Serbian army's retreat through Albania only to fall ill from the excruciating experience and die of hunger or disease after having reached Corfu.

After the retreat of the Serbian Army through Albania at the end of 1915, the French fleet transported around 150,000 Serbs to the island of Corfu during January and February 1915. Jezdić was among the soldiers, exhausted by the strenuous march through mountainous Montenegro and Albania, some were dying in staggering numbers in contrast, the most seriously ill soldiers and patients were disembarked on a small, rocky island called Vido close to Corfu, which was organized as a temporary field hospital. Without any possibility of being buried on the stony island, the surrounding sea was converted into a "blue sea tomb", where more than 5,000 people were lowered.

Vido Island, near Corfu, was a haven for those involved in Serbia’s Great Retreat, a mass escape of king and civilians. It functioned as a quarantine area. Because the rocky composition of the island made it hard to dig graves, those who died on the journey were buried at sea. It’s assumed that several thousand were buried this way. The sea around it is called Plava Grobnica or the Blue Tomb by Serbian people.

The retreat of the Serbian army and civilians through the Prokletije mountain range that encompasses Serbia, Montenegro, and Albania represents part of the great tragedy of Serbia in World War I. Corfu and Salonika was the place where the army recuperated and regrouped before departing for the front at Salonika.

== In literature ==
Brother-at-arms and war poet Milosav Jelić wrote a poem memorializing Jezdić's short but brave life. Poet Milutin Bojić, who survived the Albanian retreat, witnessed the bodies tossed at sea, and eventually succumbed to tuberculosis and died in Salonika, also wrote a moving tribute entitled Ode to a Blue Sea Tomb (Plava Grobnica).
