= EBZ =

EBZ may refer to:

- Hellenic Sugar Industry, or Ελληνική Βιομηχανία Ζάχαρης in Greek
- Ecobank Zimbabwe, commercial bank
- Brand name of Estradiol benzoate
