= Greece–Yugoslavia relations =

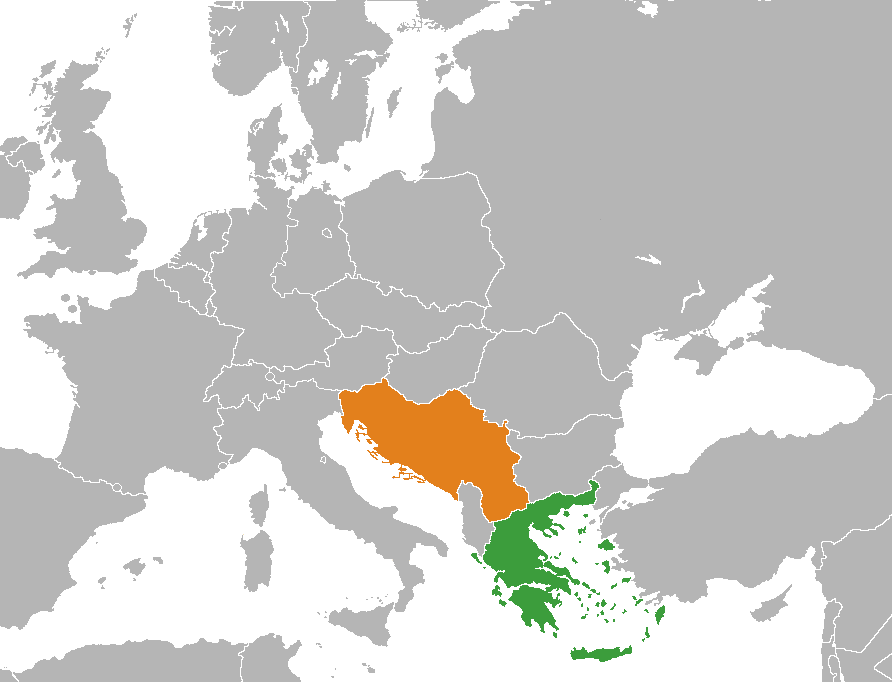

- Greece: Yugoslavia

Greece–Yugoslavia relations (Greek: Σχέσεις Ελλάδας – Γιουγκοσλαβίας; Serbo-Croatian: Grčko-jugoslavenski odnosi, Грчко-југословенски односи; Slovene: Odnosi med Grčijo in Jugoslavijo; Macedonian: Односите Грција-Југославија) were historical foreign relations between Greece (Second Hellenic Republic, Kingdom of Greece and contemporary Third Republic) and now split-up Yugoslavia (both Kingdom of Yugoslavia or Socialist Federal Republic of Yugoslavia). Relations between Greece and independent South Slavic states (primarily Serbia) developed before the creation of Yugoslavia and played a prominent role during the Balkan Wars. The creation of Yugoslavia was agreed to and made possible after the signing of the Corfu Declaration at the Municipal Theatre of Corfu.

Relations between the two states were generally friendly and were only occasionally affected (primarily in the aftermath of World War II) by Yugoslav involvement in the Greek Civil War on EAM's side and concerns around the Socialist Republic of Macedonia, which increased in prominence only after the independence of North Macedonia. Following the 1948 Tito–Stalin split, Greece supported the Yugoslav strategic position via creation of the Balkan Pact. In addition to Greece, Non-Aligned Yugoslavia developed close relations with another predominantly Greek country, the Non-Aligned island nation of Cyprus.

== Country comparison ==
Common name	Greece	Yugoslavia
Official name	Hellenic Republic	Socialist Federal Republic of Yugoslavia
Coat of arms		
Flag		
Capital	Athens	Belgrade
Largest city	Athens	Belgrade
Area	131,957 km2 (50,949 sq mi)	255,804 km2 (98,766 sq mi)
Population	10,970,155	23,229,846
Government	Unitary state, Unitary parliamentary republic	Socialist republic
Official languages	Greek	No official language Serbo-Croatian (de facto state-wide) Slovene (in Slovenia) and Macedonian (in Macedonia)
First leader	Ioannis Kapodistrias	Joseph Broz Tito
Last leader	Katerina Sakellaropoulou	Milan Pančevski
Religion	Eastern Orthodoxy (de jure),	Secular state (de jure), state atheism (de facto)
Alliances	EEC, NATO	Non-Aligned Movement

== History ==
=== Interwar period ===
After the end of World War I, Greece perceived Belgrade as a powerful neighbor with potentially hegemonic tendencies in the Balkans. Yugoslav ability to attract support from the great powers, mainly France, created concerns in Athens that Yugoslavia would pressure Greece on the status of Slavic speakers of Greek Macedonia and potentially even the Port of Thessaloniki. Greece was concerned that close ethnic, linguistic and religious links between Yugoslavia and Bulgaria would lead to an alliance. However, this alliance did not materialize as Yugoslavia was a status quo state which sought to consolidate success of the South Slavic unification movement while Bulgaria was a revisionist state. Similarly to the situation with the Kingdom of Serbia in the Second Balkan War, Yugoslavia joined forces with the Kingdom of Greece, Kingdom of Romania, and Turkey in establishing the Balkan Pact, which was aimed at maintaining the geopolitical status quo. Compared to the importance of the Macedonian question to Bulgarian elites, dominant Serb (and to a lesser extent Croat and Slovene) elites in the Kingdom of Yugoslavia expressed less interest in the issue. The Kingdom of Serbia reoriented its expansionist interest towards southern regions (with small number of ethnic Serbs) only after the Bosnian Crisis and in fear of encirclement by more powerful Austria-Hungary and Bulgaria. In the Yugoslav period, the southern part of the country was known as the Vardar Banovina.

=== Initial postwar years ===
In May 1945, 4,650 Greek refugees, mostly male members of ELAS, settled in the village of Maglić with the help of the Yugoslav government. From 1945 to 1948, it was a sui generis case of Greek extraterritorial jurisdiction. The Yugoslav conflict with the Informbiro saw the Greek community divided between loyalty to Yugoslavia and to the Comintern, and those who supported the latter left the country. The remaining also emigrated to Greek Macedonia eventually, with only a few remaining.

=== Post-1948 relations ===
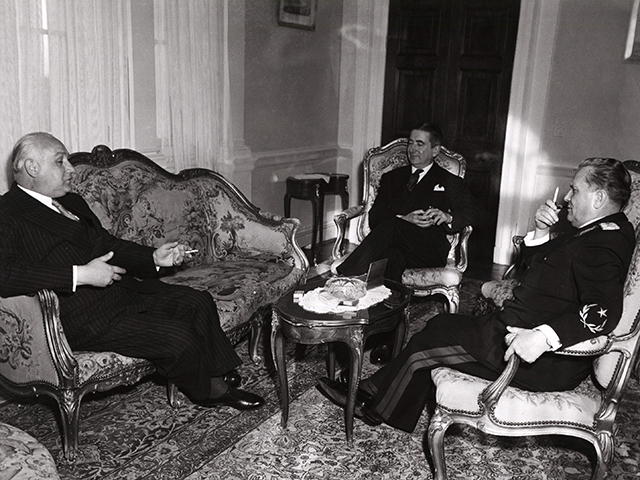
Reception of the new Ambassador of Greece in January 1951.

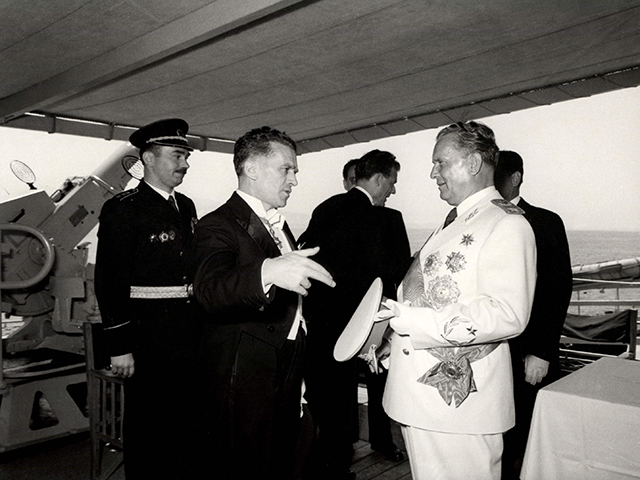
Yugoslav Ambassador to Greece Radoš Jovanović and President Josip Broz Tito at Yugoslav training ship Galeb in 1954.

The Yugoslav Non-Aligned policy enjoyed significant public support in Greece, especially among individuals and groups critical of too-close Greek alignment with the West. This criticism was on the basis that alignment with the West limited Greece's policies towards Turkey, another NATO member state. Relations between the two countries developed further after the end of the Greek junta in 1974 and the electoral victory of PASOK in 1981.

== See also ==
- Yugoslavia–European Communities relations
- Reaction in Greece to the Yugoslav Wars
- Greek–Yugoslav confederation
- Croatia–Greece relations
- Greece–Montenegro relations
- Greece–North Macedonia relations
- Greece–Serbia relations
- Refugees of the Greek Civil War
- Greece at the 1984 Winter Olympics
- Greece in the Eurovision Song Contest 1990
