= Proka Jovkić =

Serbian poet

- Born: 27 August 1886; Lalić, Austria-Hungary
- Died: 27 April 1915 (aged 28); Niš, Kingdom of Serbia
- Occupation: Writer

Proka Jovkić (Serbian Cyrillic: Прока Јовкић; 27 August 1886 – 27 April 1915) was a Serbian poet, journalist, and soldier of the early part of the 20th century who lived and wrote in the United States (1903 to 1911), and in Serbia from 1911 until his death during the First World War of typhus in Niš in 1915. He was also known by his pen name Nestor Žučni as a war poet.

== Biography ==
Vivid pictures of Proka Jovkić's boyhood are to be found in the pages of his poems, published in Serbian newspapers in San Francisco before the First Balkan War of 1912. Born in Lalić, Serbia, and spending most of his early years on its streets and nearby farms, Jovkić saw little more of schools than two or three years at a Lalić grammar school but as a youth, he enrolled at the Velika škola in Belgrade. While growing up he wanted to learn everything about life and that wanderlust took him across the Atlantic Ocean in 1903. Going there he was forced to work rather than study. That's where his real education came in work on ships and ranches and in roaming much of the United States and Canada as an itinerant worker. It was from Ellis Island and New York City that he went to Oakland, California, and published his first poetry book under the pseudonym of Nestor Žučni (Nestor the Embittered). Of all prominent Serbian writers of that period, only Proka Jovkić brought to his literary work so varied and adventurous a background.

Early resolved to be a poet and journalist, Jovkić found his best material in New York City, Oakland, San Francisco, and Chicago. Distressed by the inequalities he found in the United States, Jovkić wrote a collection of poems, most of which he previously published in Serbian ethnic newspapers and magazines in San Francisco. That collection of poems was published under the penname of Nestor Žučni (Nestor the Embittered). These were the poems of a rebellious worker who felt upon his own shoulders the exploitation of rough modern capitalism in America. His poetry was not of a very refined nature, but there was in its temperament, poetical force, and revolutionary spirit. He wrote enthusiastically in the San Francisco-based newspaper Srpska Nezavisnost (Serb Independence) about Archimandrite Sebastian Dabovich, a Serbian Orthodox missionary who was born in San Francisco in 1867. In New York City, he befriended the likes of Nikola Tesla and Mihailo Pupin, the two most prominent Serbs of their day. Jovkić's output was soon eagerly sought by popular newspapers and magazines and collected in book form.

Jovkić's life as an itinerant worker had made him a rebel and study had made him a socialist. Much of his writing expressed the social protest reflected in this activity, notably Nestor Žučni (Nestor the Embittered), his first book of collected poems.

Encouraged by positive reviews of Jovan Skerlić from back home (in Belgrade), he soon published his second book Poezije neba i zemlje (Poetry of Heaven and Earth, first published in San Francisco, 1910). After moving back to Serbia to join the army in the First Balkan War, he published his third and final poetry book – Kniga borbe i života (The Book of Battles and Life Struggles, 1912) in Serbia. He succumbed to typhus some three years later in Niš.

== Work ==
The first Serbian-American poet, Proka Jovkić, lived in San Francisco and Oakland at the beginning of the century, from 1903 to 1911. The epithet “the poet-torch” underlines the character of his poetry; his work was greatly influenced by the tempestuous events at the turn of the century in his native land, menaced by war. Under the impact of Maxim Gorki and owing to the resemblance of their lives, he coined the pseudonym Nestor Žućni (Nestor the Embittered), which denotes the bitterness of one's existence. (Some have unfairly compared him with Jack London). This literary Bohemian earned his bread first as a typographer and then as an editor of the daily Serb Independence in San Francisco. Creator of the new sensibility in patriotic poetry, his poems of exile and national struggle were enflamed. The literary revolt, pronounced in his verses, inspired the Promethean Pesme: Nezadovoljnika i Roba (Poems: Dissatisfied and Imprisoned).

== See also ==
- Milutin Bojić
- Vladislav Petković Dis
- Miloš Crnjanski
- Dušan Vasiljev
- Ljubomir Micić,
- Rastko Petrović
- Stanislav Vinaver
- Branislav Milosavljević
