= Greece–North Macedonia relations =

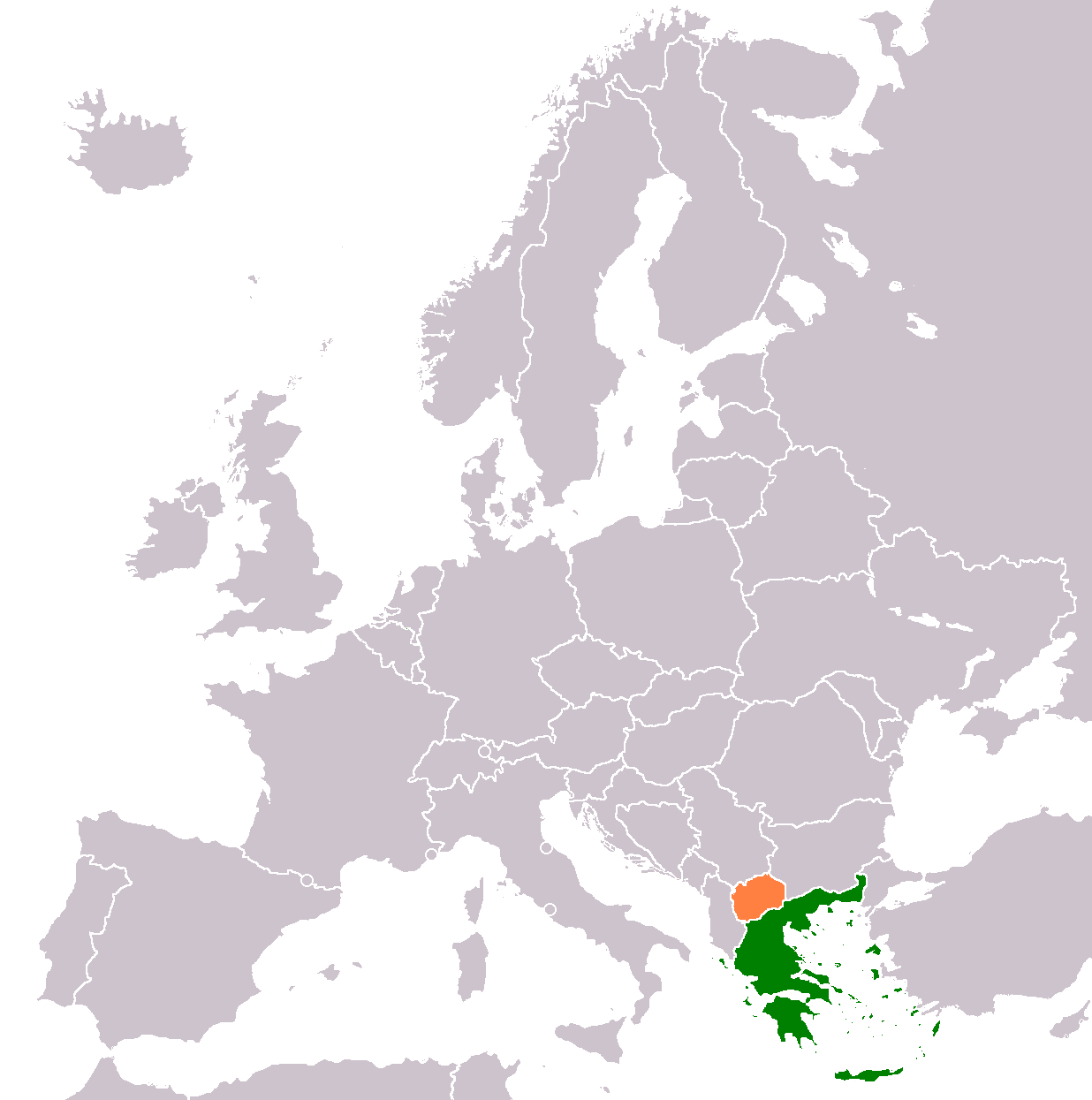

- Greece: North Macedonia

Bilateral relations exist between Greece and North Macedonia. Greece has an embassy in Skopje, and a Consulate General in Bitola. Similarly, North Macedonia maintains an embassy in Athens, and a consulate-general in Thessaloniki. Both countries are members of the Council of Europe and NATO. Greece is an EU member and North Macedonia is an EU candidate.

== Relations ==
Ever since the former Republic of Macedonia broke away from former Yugoslavia in 1991, Greece has refused to recognize its name.

The provisional reference the Former Yugoslav Republic of Macedonia (FYROM) was used in relations with Greece from 1991 to 2019. All United Nations member-states agreed to accept any final agreement resulting from negotiations between the two countries. The dispute did not prevent the two countries from enjoying close trade links and investment levels (especially from Greece), but it generated a great deal of political and academic debate on both sides.

On 13 September 1995, the two countries signed the Interim Accord, whereby Greece recognized the Republic of Macedonia under its provisional reference. Negotiations aimed at resolving the dispute continued intermittently from 1995 to 2018. Under Greek pressure, the European Union and NATO agreed that in order for the Republic of Macedonia to receive an invitation to join these institutions the name dispute needed to be resolved first. This resulted in a case at the International Court of Justice against Greece for violation of the Interim Accord.

In the 2001 insurgency in the Republic of Macedonia, Greece sent peacekeeping forces together with other NATO and European Union members. In addition, Greece donated 10 APC Leonidas-2 to the Republic of Macedonia.

On 4 October 2012, the Greek foreign minister Dimitris Avramopoulos sent a memorandum of understanding to the Foreign Minister of the Republic of Macedonia, Nikola Poposki.

On 12 June 2018, Greece agreed to recognize its neighbor as the Republic of North Macedonia, a move which the Republic of Macedonia welcomed, and on 17 June 2018 the two Prime Ministers (Alexis Tsipras and Zoran Zaev) signed the Prespa agreement ending the naming dispute. The agreement was subject to a national referendum held in the Republic of Macedonia on 30 September 2018, which approved the agreement and renamed the country to "North Macedonia".

In 2019 Delphi Economic Forum, Alexis Tsipras announced also the intention of the two countries to found a Supreme Council of Cooperation.

Prior to 2019, Greece maintained a Liaison Office in Skopje and an Office of Consular, Economic and Commercial Affairs in Bitola. Similarly, North Macedonia maintained a Liaison Office in Athens and an Office for Consular, Economic and Commercial Affairs in Thessaloniki. However, since May 2019, the two countries exchanged notes verbales upgrading their Liaison Offices and the Consular Offices into Embassies and Consulate Generals, as result of the Prespa Agreement.

During the COVID-19 pandemic, Greece donated 20,000 vaccines to North Macedonia.

Tensions between the two countries returned after the election of the nationalist party VMRO-DPMNE in May 2024. The new President of North Macedonia Siljanovska-Davkova used the formerly widely used name "Macedonia" during her inauguration. The Greek prime minister Kyriakos Mitsotakis called the speech an "illegal and unacceptable act" that "constitutes a violation of the Prespa Agreement." and threatened to block North Macedonia's EU admission.

In March 2025, several individuals injured in the Kočani nightclub fire were transferred to Greece for treatment, following Greece's offer of assistance to North Macedonia.

== Resident diplomatic missions ==
- Greece has an embassy in Skopje and a consulate-general in Bitola.
- North Macedonia has an embassy in Athens and a consulate-general in Thessaloniki.

== See also ==
- Foreign relations of Greece
- Foreign relations of North Macedonia
- Greece–Yugoslavia relations
- Accession of North Macedonia to the European Union
- North Macedonia–NATO relations
- Centre for the Macedonian Language in Greece
- Greeks in North Macedonia
- Macedonians (Greeks)
- Slavic speakers of Greek Macedonia
