= Svetislav Cvijanović =

Serbian bookseller and publisher

Svetislav Cvijanović (Županja, Slavonia, Austria-Hungary, 1877 – Belgrade, Serbia, Yugoslavia, 1961) was one of Belgrade's most prominent Serbian booksellers and publishers, and a great patron of writers of the first half of the 20th century. Publishers Svetislav B. Cvijanović, Gaetz Kohn (Geca Kon) and Gavrilo Dimitrijević were the three largest booksellers and publishers in Belgrade during that period.

Cvijanović and his Belgrade publishing house were noted for printing the first works of war poet Milutin Bojić, Nobel-laureate Ivo Andrić, Pavle Popović, Isidora Sekulić, and other internationally-acclaimed writers and poets.

In 1928, he wrote a book of poetry entitled Granice (Borders)
