= Centre for the Macedonian Language in Greece =

Organization for the Macedonian language in Greece

- Центар за македонски јазик во Грција; Κέντρο Μακεδονικής Γλώσσας στην Ελλάδα
- Logo of the Centre for the Macedonian Language in Greece
- Formation: 27 July 2022; 3 years ago
- Type: NGO and NPO
- Headquarters: Florina
- Location: Greece
- Website: makedonski.gr

The Centre for the Macedonian Language in Greece (Macedonian: Центар за македонски јазик во Грција, romanized: Centar za makedonski jazik vo Grcija; Greek: Κέντρο Μακεδονικής Γλώσσας στην Ελλάδα, romanized: Kéntro Makedonikís Glóssas stin Elláda) is a non-governmental and nonprofit organization aimed at preserving the Macedonian language in Greece. It is based in Florina (Macedonian: Лерин, romanized: Lerin) and its registration was officially approved on 27 July 2022 by the Court of First Instance of Florina. The organization aims to offer free Macedonian-language courses online and advocates for the introduction of Macedonian in public education in Greece and for the recognition of Macedonian as a minority language in the country. Other activities of the centre include support for the training of Macedonian-language teachers, the documentation of local Macedonian dialects and the tracking of human rights violations against Macedonian-speakers.

The Prime Minister of North Macedonia at that time, Zoran Zaev, praised the establishment of the centre, calling it one of the fruits of the 2018 Prespa Agreement and a confirmation of the close relations between the two countries. He also thanked the Prime Minister of Greece at that time, Kyriakos Mitsotakis, and his predecessor Alexis Tsipras, for the efforts made to improve relations with North Macedonia in the years prior to the formation of the centre.

Shortly after its registration, the public prosecutor of the Florina regional unit, political parties and cultural and far-right organizations submitted several lawsuits and requests demanding the annulment of the registration of the centre, all of which the Court of First Instance of Florina rejected. The Centre for the Macedonian Language in Greece expressed great satisfaction at this and at the apparent change, according to it, that was taking place in Greek justice after decades of opposition to the existence of organizations of its kind in the country.

The one-member Court of Appeal of Western Macedonia later overturned the previous judicial decisions regarding the centre's functioning. Hristijan Mickoski, the Prime Minister of North Macedonia, described this new decision as a Greek attempt at "provocation", while the founders of the centre stated that they would appeal against it.
