= Serb volunteers in the Greek War of Independence =

Some Serbs joined the Greeks, their co-religionists, in the Greek War of Independence (1821–29). Volunteers arrived from Serbia, Montenegro, and territories still under Ottoman rule, to fight alongside the Greek rebels against the Ottoman Empire. Several of the volunteers were veterans of the Serbian Revolution, such as Hadži-Prodan.

== Background ==
During the first decades of the 19th century, the First Serbian Uprising and the secret preparations for a Greek revolution coincided. The news of the Serbian revolt of 1804 were received with great joy by the Greeks, who viewed it as a paradigm for a Greek national revolution. The ground for a common action had been prepared already from the end of 18th century, when the Greek intellectual and revolutionary Rigas Feraios, inspired by the French Revolution, envisioned a common revolution of all the Balkan nations against the Ottoman Empire and the formation of a Balkan federation.

Military cooperation between the two nations was forged in the semi-autonomous Danubian Principalities, which were governed mostly by Phanariote Greek voivodes. There are indications that communication and cooperation between Serbs and Greeks of the Greek mainland had also been established early. For example, in 1806 the French consul in Thessaloniki reported that “the Turks are very furious against the Greeks because of their communications with the Serbs”.

Several distinguished Serbs had been accepted as members ("brothers") in the Filiki Eteria, the secret organization that prepared the Greek Revolution, despite officially only enlisting ethnic Greeks. Symbolic of Greek-Serbian friendship was the blood brotherhood between Greek armatolos Giorgakis Olympios and Serbian rebel leader Karađorđe; Olympios had fought in the Serbian Revolution and was married to the widow of hajduk Veljko Petrović.

On the other hand, many eminent Greeks in Wallachia and Russia, politicians, merchants etc. assisted the Serbian Revolution in many ways. For example, Constantine Ypsilantis, father of the Eteria leader Alexandros Ypsilantis, had, as voivode of Wallachia, helped the revolutionaries of Karađorđe, while Ioannis Kapodistrias as Russian Minister of External Affairs offered diplomatic support to the Serbian cause in international meetings like the Congress of Vienna.

Apart from R. Feraios, other leading Greek revolutionaries conceived a common Greek-Serbian-Montenegrin revolution, but due to diverging political strategies of the two nations this did not happen. The Eteria had suggested collaboration to Miloš Obrenović I, Prince of Serbia, but the latter preferred political arbitrations rather than a military confrontation with the Ottoman Empire. Consequently, the Greco-Serbian military cooperation was limited. From the Greek side there were isolated acts, like the attempt of the Greek armatolos Nikotsaras, captain of few hundred fighters, to march in 1807 from Greece to Serbia in order to join the army of Karađorđe.

== Serbs in the Greek Revolution ==
The first Serbian presence in the Greek Revolution occurred during the revolt's outbreak in Wallachia (1821). The political and military leader of the revolution, Alexandros Ypsilantis, apart from Greeks and other ethnicities, had a number of Serb fighters under his command, known collectively as "Arvanites". Some of the notable fighters were captains Milenko Stojković, Petar Dobrnjac, Hadži-Prodan, Mladen Milovanović and archimandrite "Servos", head of 300 Greeks and Serbs killed in battle. All the above were the leaders of mixed units of Greeks and Serbians.

After the failure of revolution in Wallachia, many of them moved south to Greece to continue fighting against Ottoman forces. Other Serbs were already in Greece enlisted in the Ottoman army, who defected to the Greek side after the outbreak of the revolution.

A group of 105 Serbs under the Serbian philhellene Anastasije Dmitrijević moved to Greece with the beginning of the Revolution and participated in many battles till the end of the Revolution. Several of those men were killed in battle.

Other Serbian leaders who participated in the Revolution of 1821 were:

- George Papazoglou (Γεώργιος Παπάζογλου). Cavalry officer under Chatzi Christos the Bulgarian, killed in the battle.
- Constantin Nemania. He was signing as “Prince of Serbia” and was using a seal with the double-headed eagle. Having fallen in great poverty he was granted a small financial assistance and “five breads per day” by the Greek Revolutionary Government for some time. He left from Greece to Russia in 1823.
- Radoš (Ράντος Μαυροβουνιώτης).
- Other Serbs encountered in the history of the revolution are Thomas Servos, Lambros Servos, Lambros Christou Servos and Thanassis Servos in Messolongi, Giovanis Servos (cavalry sergeant under Chatzi Christos the Bulgarian), Kotsos (Constantine) Servos et al.

Some fighters from Montenegro were known as Mavrovouniotis (Greek for "Montenegrin"), such as Joannos Slavanos Mavrovouniotis, Joannos Montenegrinos (participated in the siege of Tripolitsa), Gregory Jurovic Mavrovouniotis and Vasos Mavrovouniotis from Bjelopavlići. The latter came from Smyrna to Greece in 1820 and became the leader of a group of Montenegrins, many of them being his brothers and relatives. A notable Montenegrin philhellene was General De Wintz, who had also fought under Napoleon. He attempted to assemble a unit of 2,000 European volunteers or mercenaries to fight in Greece and Cyprus but he did not manage to get any financial assistance. Another group of 25 Serbs under the leadership of the Greek George Kontopoulos is known for their participation in the sieges of Messolonghi.

At the beginning of the revolution the Serbian units were ethnically homogeneous, but gradually, a mutual trust and a sense of brotherhood with the Greeks was developed. Thus, after 1823 Greeks enlisted in Serbian units and vice versa. Most of these troops were irregulars, with the exception of a corps of 250 Greeks and Serbs led by the Serbian Stefanos or Stefos Nivitsa, part of a tactical army under the commandment of the French philhellene Charles Nicolas Fabvier (Loukatos, pp 105–107).

After 1824 many Serbians and Montenegrins ascended the hierarchy of the Greek army, such as the generals Chatzi Christos Dagovic and Vasos Mavrovouniotis, the battalion commanders (chiliarchs) Stefos and Anastasi Dmitrevic, vice-chiliarch Jovo Mavrovouniotis, Captains Ioannis and Nikolaos Radovic from Montenegro and the Serbians Nikolzo, Kotzo, Helias, Spyros, Sterios Pitolites (from Bitola) and Karagiorgos.

Many changed their original name for the safety of their relatives or for other reasons. Thus, in the archives they are recorded with their Christian name and the epithet Servos or Serbes (Serb), Mavrovouniotis (Montenegrin), Bosnakos (Bosnian) or the name of their home-town (e.g. Katzos Monastirlis i.e. from Manastır/Bitola). Most were under the age of 25 at the beginning of the Revolution. The Montenegrins originated mostly from the tribe of Bjelopavlići and the Serbs from Bitola, Belgrade, Psarades and Niš.

Some of the volunteers remained in Greece after the Revolution and became fully Hellenized, like Vasos Mavrovouniotis.

== Bibliography ==
- Protopsaltis, E. G. "Σέρβοι και Μαυροβούνιοι Φιλέλληνες κατά την επανάστασιν του 1821" [Serbian and Montenegrin Philhellenes in the 1821 Revolution].
- Loukatos, Spyros D. (1979). "Σέρβοι, Μαυροβούνιοι και Βόσνιοι, μαχητές της ελληνικής ανεξαρτησίας" [Serbs, Montenegrins and Bosnians, Fighters of Greek Independence]. Πρακτικά του Ι' Ελληνοσερβικού Συμποσίου. Thessaloniki.
- Loukatos, Spyros D. (1978). "Le philhellénisme balkanique pendant la lutte pour l'independance hellénique". Balkan Studies. 19: 249–283.
- Loukatos, Spyros D. (1970). "Scheseis Hellēnōn meta Servōn kai Maurovouniōn kata tēn Hellēnikēn Epanastasin 1823-1826" [Relations between Greeks, Serbs and Montenegrins during the Greek Revolution 1823-1826]. Thessaloniki: Hetaireia Makedonikōn Spoudōn.
- Lascaris, Michael (1936). Ελληνες και Σέρβοι κατά τους απελευθερωτικούς αγώνας 1804-1830 [Greeks and Serbs in the Struggles for Liberation 1804-1830]. Athens.
- "Cooperation between Greeks and Serbs during their struggles for liberation 1804-1830". 1st Greek-Serbian Symposium (7-10 November 1976) (in Greek). Institute for Balkan Studies. 1979.
  - Vakalopoulos, A. "The National uprising of the Serbs as a paradigm for the Greek Revolution of 1821". Cooperation Between Greeks and Serbs ...: 9–17.
- Παπαδριανός, Ιωάννης Α. "Μαυροβούνιοι εθελοντές στον εθνικοαπελευθερωτικό αγώνα των Ελλήνων στα 1821." Βαλκανικά Σύμμεικτα 11 (2000): 161–178.
- Dakin, Douglas. The Greek struggle for independence, 1821–1833. Univ of California Press, 1973.
- Clair, William St. That Greece might still be free: the Philhellenes in the War of Independence. Open Book Publishers, 2008.
- Clogg, Richard. "Aspects of the movement for Greek independence." The Struggle for Greek Independence. Palgrave Macmillan UK, 1973. 1-40.
