= Plava grobnica =

World War I ode by Milutin Bojić

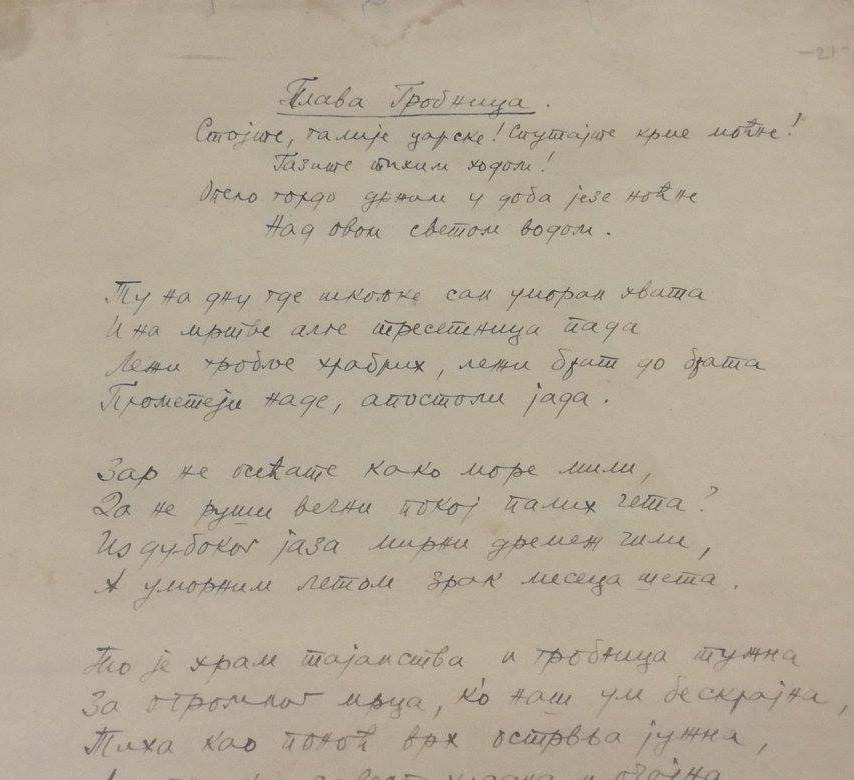
The original manuscript of Plava grobnica, discovered in late 2014

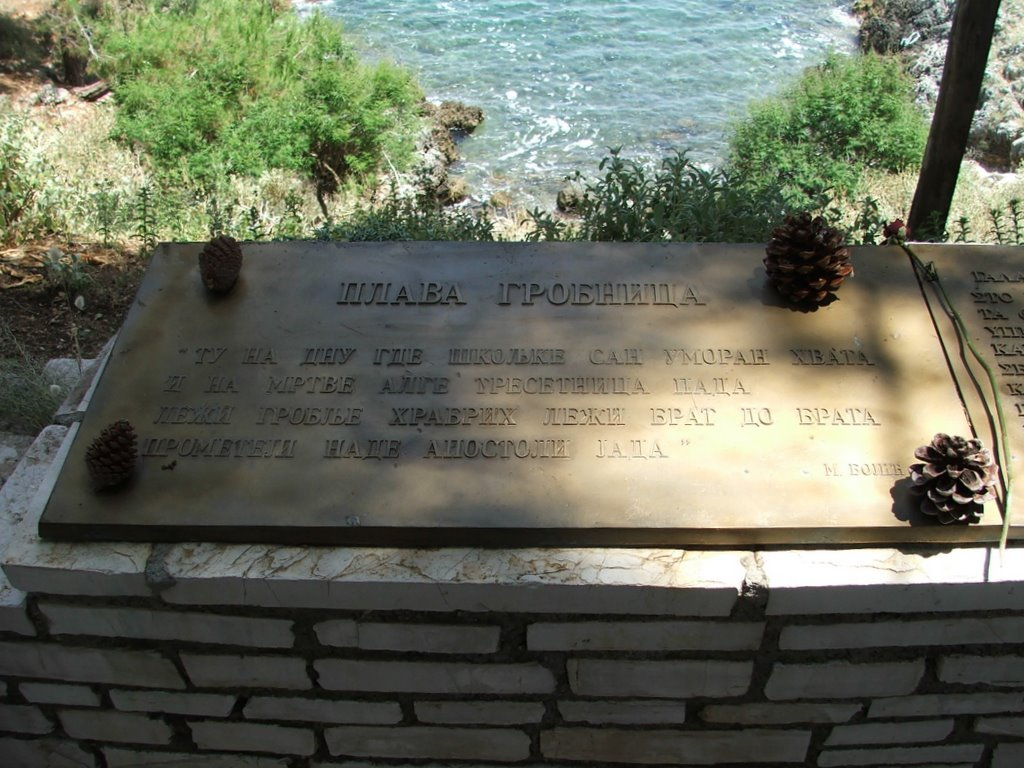
A memorial plaque commemorating the ode on the Vido island

Plava grobnica (Serbian Cyrillic: Плава гробница, lit. 'The Blue Tomb') is an ode written by Serbian poet Milutin Bojić during World War I. It is dedicated to the soldiers that were buried in the sea near Vido island, Greece. In his unforgettable poem, Bojić expressed the tragic fate of Serbia, whose army had passed through Montenegro and Albania to the Greek islands of Corfu and Vido, where over 5,000 Serbian soldiers were buried at sea.

== Background ==
Bojić survived the exodus from Serbia and the desperation of Corfu, and yet in the end succumbed to tuberculosis in Salonika. "Our church bells toll the dead instead of the hours," Bojić wrote of seeing his comrades-at-arms dying around him. At the time of the Serbian retreat he had been working on an epic poem, Cain, in which he compared Bulgaria's attack on Serbia (that precipitated the retreat) to the biblical story of Cain and Abel. The poem was one of the few things he carried with him as he made the winter journey over the mountains. Upon arriving at the Adriatic only to see his fellow Serbs being thrown out to the sea for burial, he penned one of the most moving war poems of his generation -- Plava grobnica or The Blue Sea Tomb.

== Plava grobnica ==
Hold on, Imperial galleons! Hamper your oars!
Tread with a silent trotter!
A proud mass, I hold, in the creep of night,
Above this holy water.

Here on the seabed, among the sleepy shells,
Where algae covered by peat moss burrow,
Lays a graveyard of heroes, lays brother beside brother,
The Prometheuses of hope, the Apostles of sorrow.

Don’t you notice how the sea is slow-moving,
Not to disturb the eternal rest of the fallen?
From the Deep trench peace is softly dreaming,
While tired Moon rays fall in.

This temple of mystery and the graveyard of sorrow
For the giant corpse endless as our mind
As calm as the midnight above the south islands is
Yet dark as consciousness, cold and in despair.

Can’t you feel from these livid depths
That piety rules this seas
And the air is rife with pantomime?
It’s the soul of the fallen that roams with ease.

Hold on, Imperial galleons! On the grave of my fallen brothers
Veil your trumpets in mourning black!
And let men-at-arms sing the mass
Here where the waves smack.

For many centuries will pass
Unnoticed will remain the sea waves
A new generation will come to build
A shiny home over these very graves.

But this graveyard in which lies
The tragic secret of an epic deed
Will cradle the immortality of glory
Where the spirit will search for its lead.

Resting here are the laurels of the past
And the transient joys of a whole nation
In this sombre grave under the blue waves
Between the Earth and the sky dome.

Hold on, Imperial galleons! Put out your torches
Cease the splashing of your oars
When my requiem is done, glide into the dark night
In piety and silence.

For I want an endless silence to rule
For the dead to hear the battles’ furore
How their boiling blood sparks in their sons
Under the wings of glory.

For there far away, the battlefields are flooded
With the same blood that is at rest here to fade
Here, over the fathers the peace reigns,
While there, over the sons, the history is made.

That’s why I need peace for this requiem
Without words, without tears or quiet sighs
To unite the clouds of incense and gunpowder
With the muted rumbling of far-away drums.

Hold on, Imperial galleons! In the name of respect!
Tread with a silent trotter!
A proud mass, I hold, like the heavens haven’t seen yet
Above this holy water.

== See also ==
- Ode to a Blue Sea Tomb (an older version, translated by Michael M. Petrovich)
- Serbian Campaign of World War I
- Serbian Museum of Corfu
- Tamo daleko
