= Vido =

Greek island

Native name: Βίδο
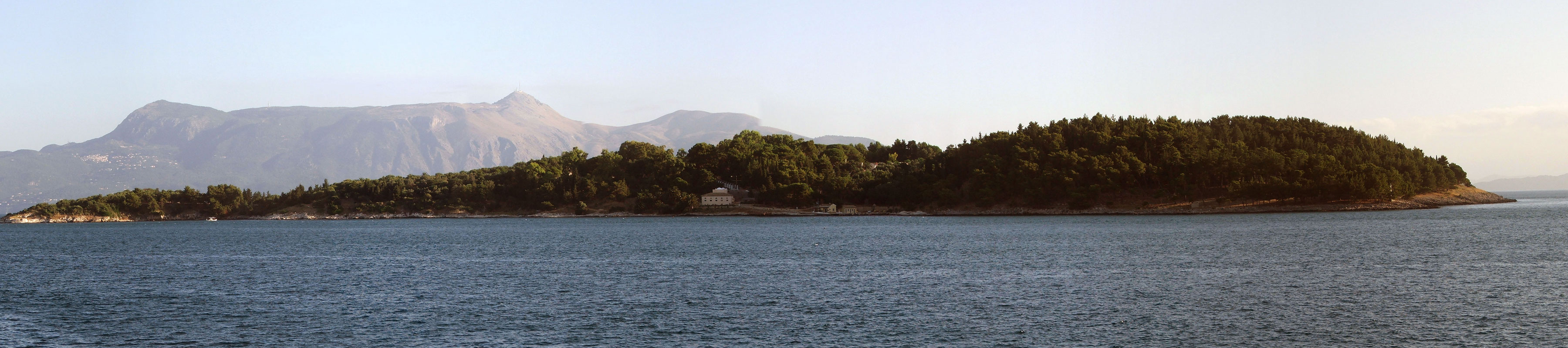

- Location within Greece

Geography
- Coordinates: 39°38′30″N 19°55′30″E

Administration
- Greece

Vido (Greek: Βίδο) is an island of the Ionian Islands group of Greece.

== Location ==
This small island (less than a kilometer in diameter) is at the mouth of the port of Corfu, about 1 km north of the old fort.

== History ==
The island was known to the ancients as Ptychia (Ancient Greek: Πτυχία). At some point during the Peloponnesian War, Athenian generals used Ptychia in order to keep some prisoners in captivity.

There was once three forts on the island: Fort Schulenburg, Fort George in the southeast and Fort Wellington in the southwest close to the harbour. The first one was Fort Schulenburg, built in the northwest of the island on the initiative of Johann Matthias von der Schulenburg; its building started in 1716 and was completed in 1727 - along with an enclosure around the whole island. Then the French expanded Fort Schulenberg and built two more forts: Napoleon’s Redoute and Signal Redoute, adding tunnels to connect those to the existing fortifications. When the British took over the Ionian Islands, they too expanded Fort Schulenburg, adding towers with four canons at the top; furthermore, they demolished all the French buildings and replaced them with three new forts, designed by Lieutenant W. Worsley. These were built in secret and their maps drawn incorrectly to deceive potential enemies. But in 1864 the Ionian Islands were given to Greece and, as part of that agreement, the fortresses were blown up. Some remnants of Fort Wellington can still be seen.

The island was involved in the Siege of Corfu (1798–99), where the Russo-Ottoman allies captured it from the French on 28 February 1799.

During the First World War, Corfu served as an island hospital and quarantine for sick Serbian soldiers following the epic retreat of the Serbian army and part of the civilian population through Montenegro and Albania in 1915, after the Austro-German-Bulgarian invasion of Serbia (see Serbian Campaign). While the main camps of the recuperating army were on Corfu itself (a contingent was sent to Bizerte as well, and many of the civilian refugees were accepted by France), the sick and near-dying, mostly soldiers, were treated on Vido to prevent epidemics. In spite of Allied material help, the conditions of both the improvised medical facilities and many of the patients on the island resulted in a high fatality rate. Due to the small area of the island and its rocky soil, it soon became necessary to bury the dead at sea (weighting the corpses with rocks to prevent them from floating). Over 5,000 people were buried at sea near the island of Vido.

A monument of gratitude to the Greek nation was erected at Vido by Serbs in the 1930s.

Wildlife on the island include peacocks, pheasants and rabbits.

The waters around Vido island are sometimes referred to as the Blue Sea Tomb (Serbian: Plava Grobnica), after a poem written by Milutin Bojić after World War I.

Serbian mausoleum

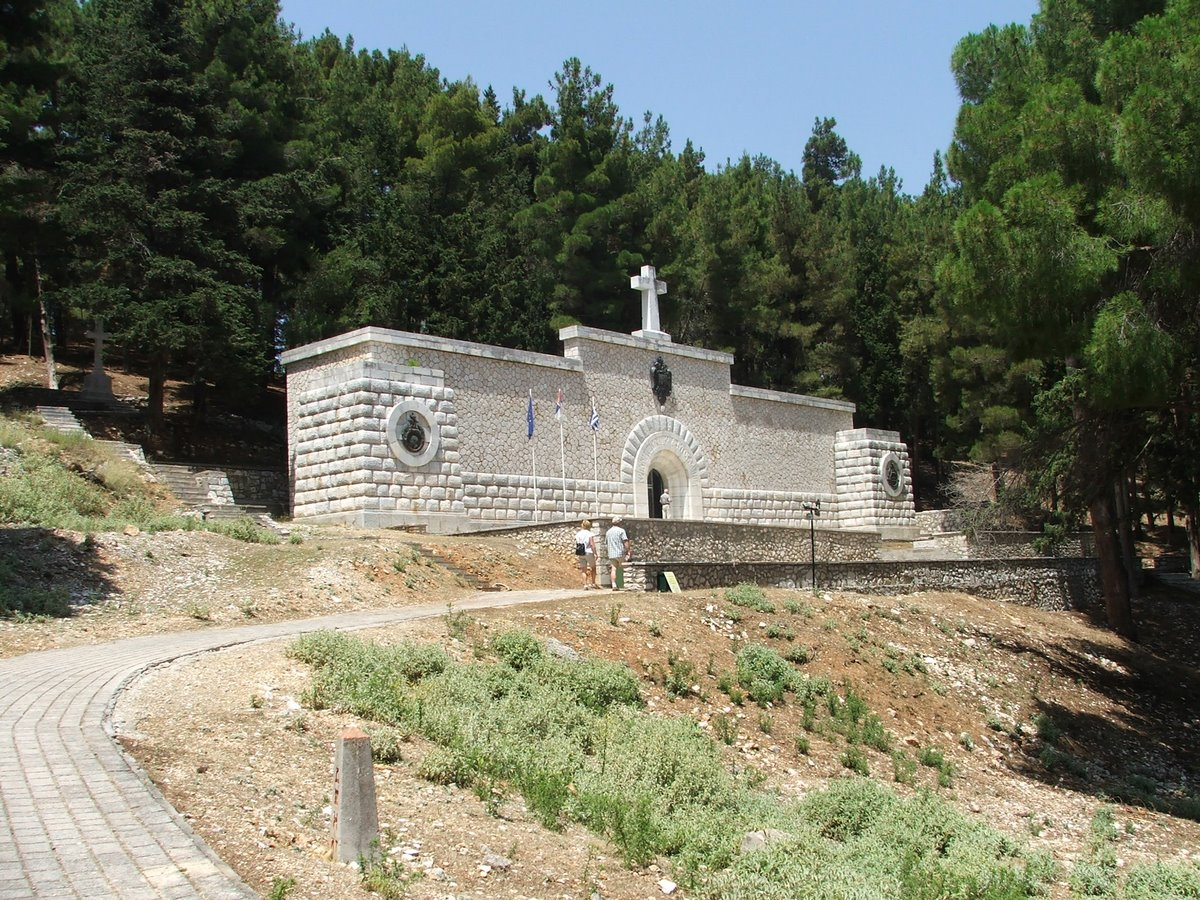
Serbian World War I soldiers' mausoleum

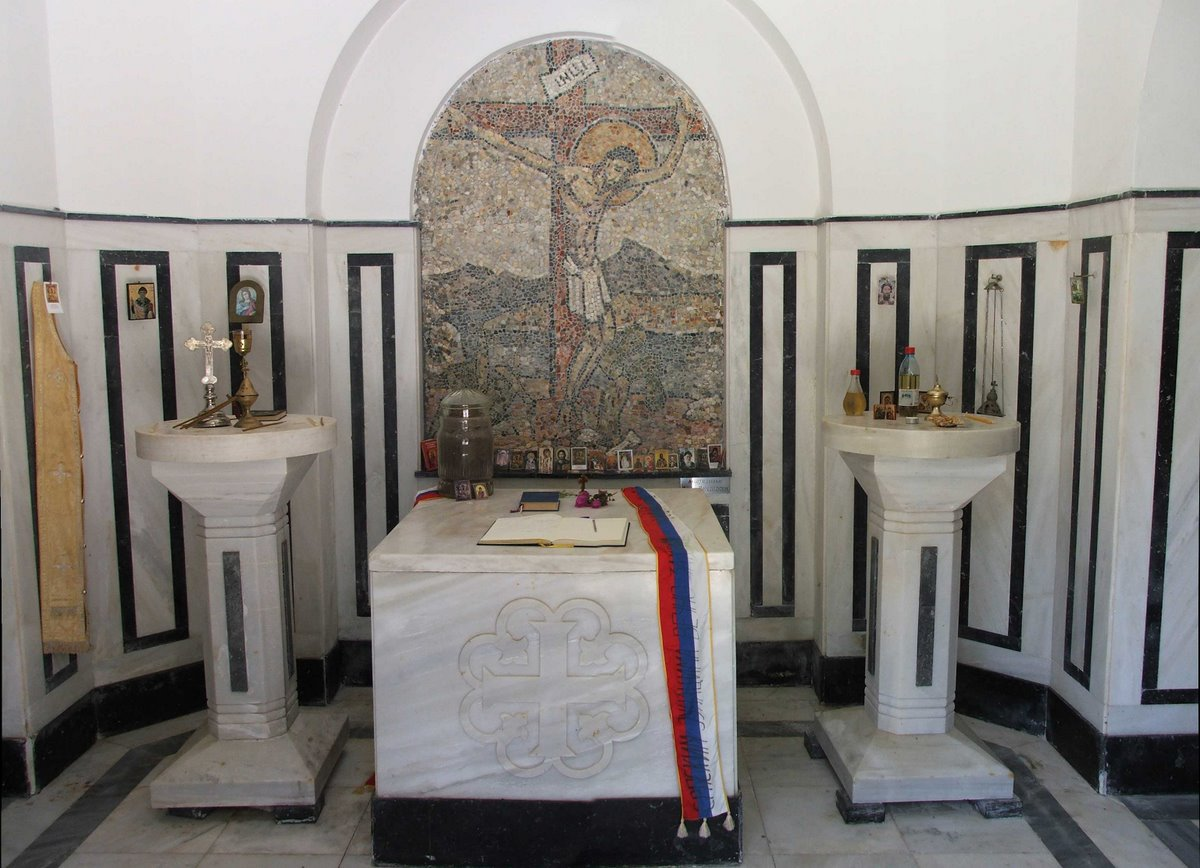
Interior of mausoleum

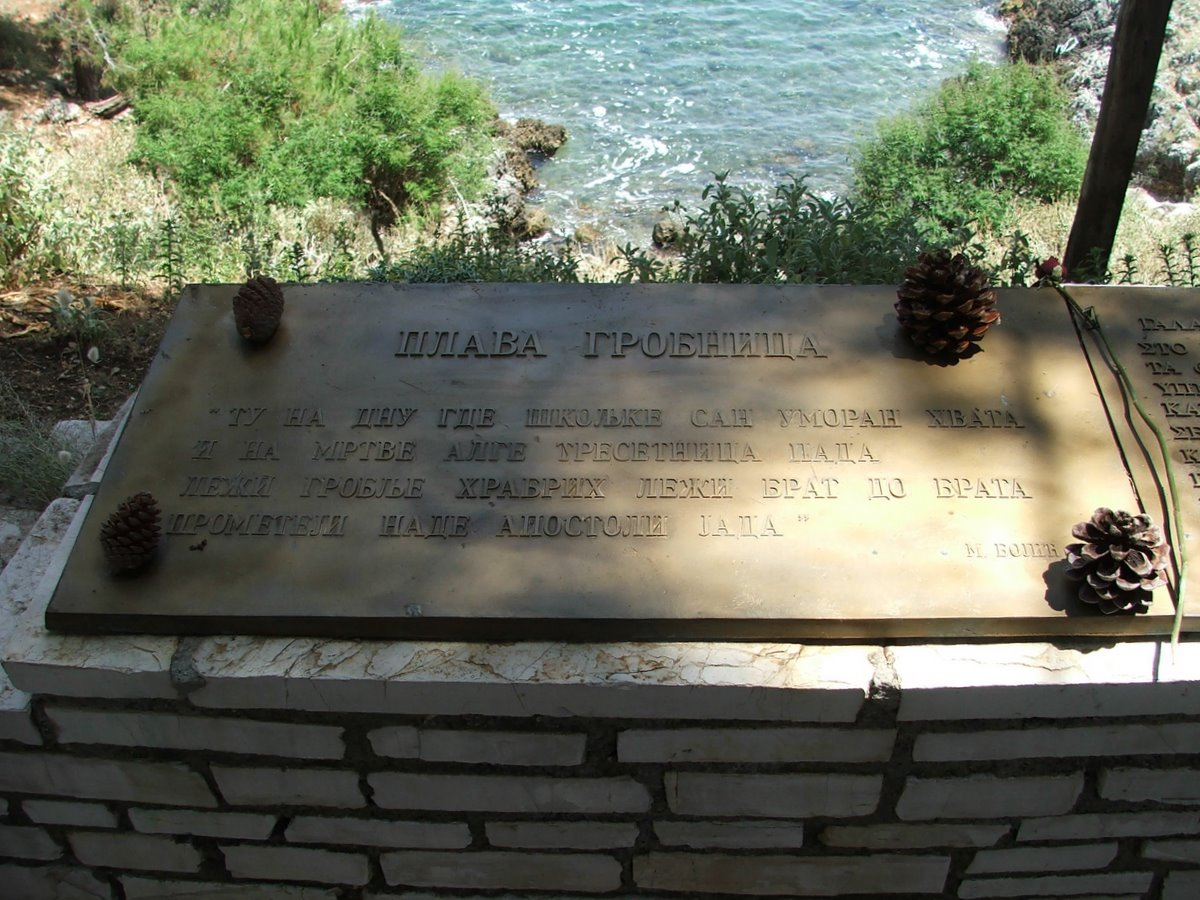
Blue Graveyard memorial plaque

== See also ==
=== Related article ===
- Serbian Campaign (World War I)
