= Hellenic Sugar Industry =

Sugar producer in Greece

- Company type: State owned
- Industry: Food and beverages, manufacturing
- Founded: 1960
- Headquarters: Thessaloniki, Greece
- Products: Sugar, animal feed.
- Net income: €147.6 million (2009)
- Website: www.ebz.gr (in Greek)

Hellenic Sugar Industry SA or HSI is a sugar producer in Greece. In Greek is known as "Ελληνική Βιομηχανία Ζάχαρης" or "ΕΒΖ". Its main product is white crystalline sugar. Its sugar factories are located in Platy, Serres, Orestiada, Larissa, Xanthi and is the only shareholder of two sugar factories in Serbia.

Due to financial difficulties experienced during the crisis the board of directors was planning to sell the two factories in Serbia in order to compensate for the rising debt, but eventually this plan was called off. In 2018, HSI's liabilities had risen to €246,6 million. During the crisis, under the face of cumulative burden and negative equity to request protection from creditors HSI is currently under the management of special liquidator PQH, which has already held three failed tenders to sell it. In an effort to tackle high costs, the Greek state tried to switch production of expensive sugarcane producers towards cheaper sellers, while subsidizing those who introduce cheaper methods of sugarcane agriculture.

At the moment, Piraeus Bank, which is the biggest creditor of HSI, is pressuring the state to sell HSI in order to restructure its debt., with potential investor being the Innovation Brain Fund.
