= Timeline of Kumanovo =

The following is a timeline of the history of the city of Kumanovo, North Macedonia.

== Prehistory ==
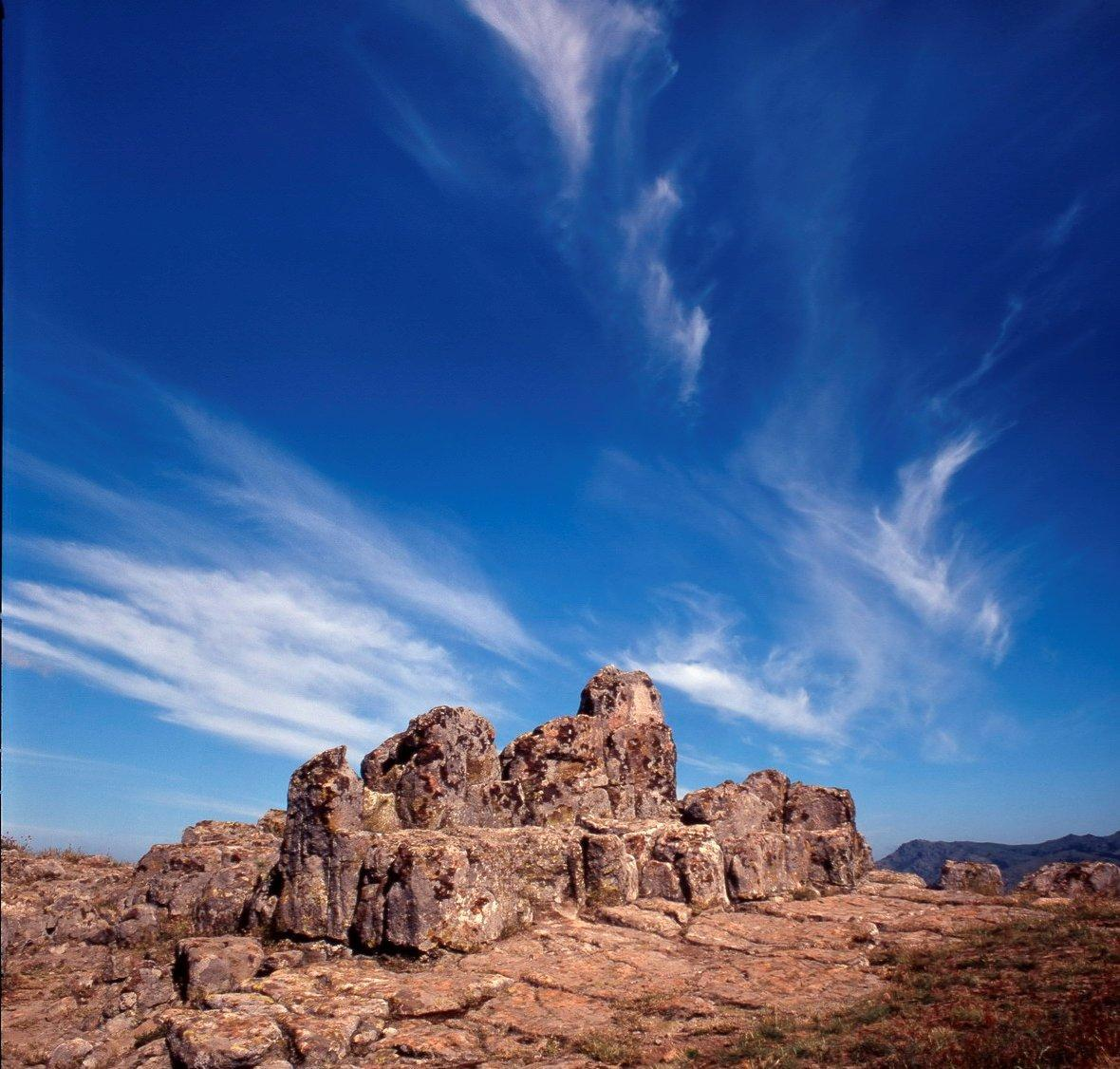
Megalithic Observatory Kokino

- Kostoperska Karpa settlement established
- Bronze Age Gradiste settlement established
- Neolithic site of Mlado Nagoričane settlement established
- Iron Age tumulus Groblje at Vojnik established

== Antic Period ==
- 600 BC – 217 BC Kumanovo area under Peoninan Kingdom
- (148BC-330AD) Kumanovo area under Roman Empire
  - Roman Necropolis Drezga of Lopate established
  - Roman Settlement Vicianus at village of Klečovce established

== Early Middle Ages ==
- (330-836) Kumanovo area under Byzantine Empire
  - Slavic tribes arrived: Berziti

== Middle Ages ==
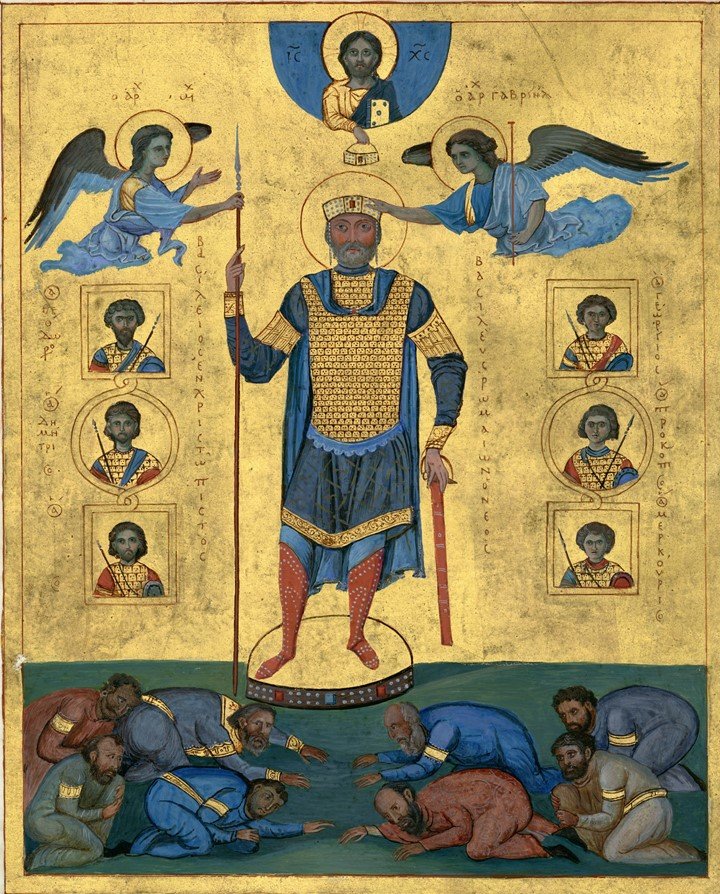
Emperor Basil II

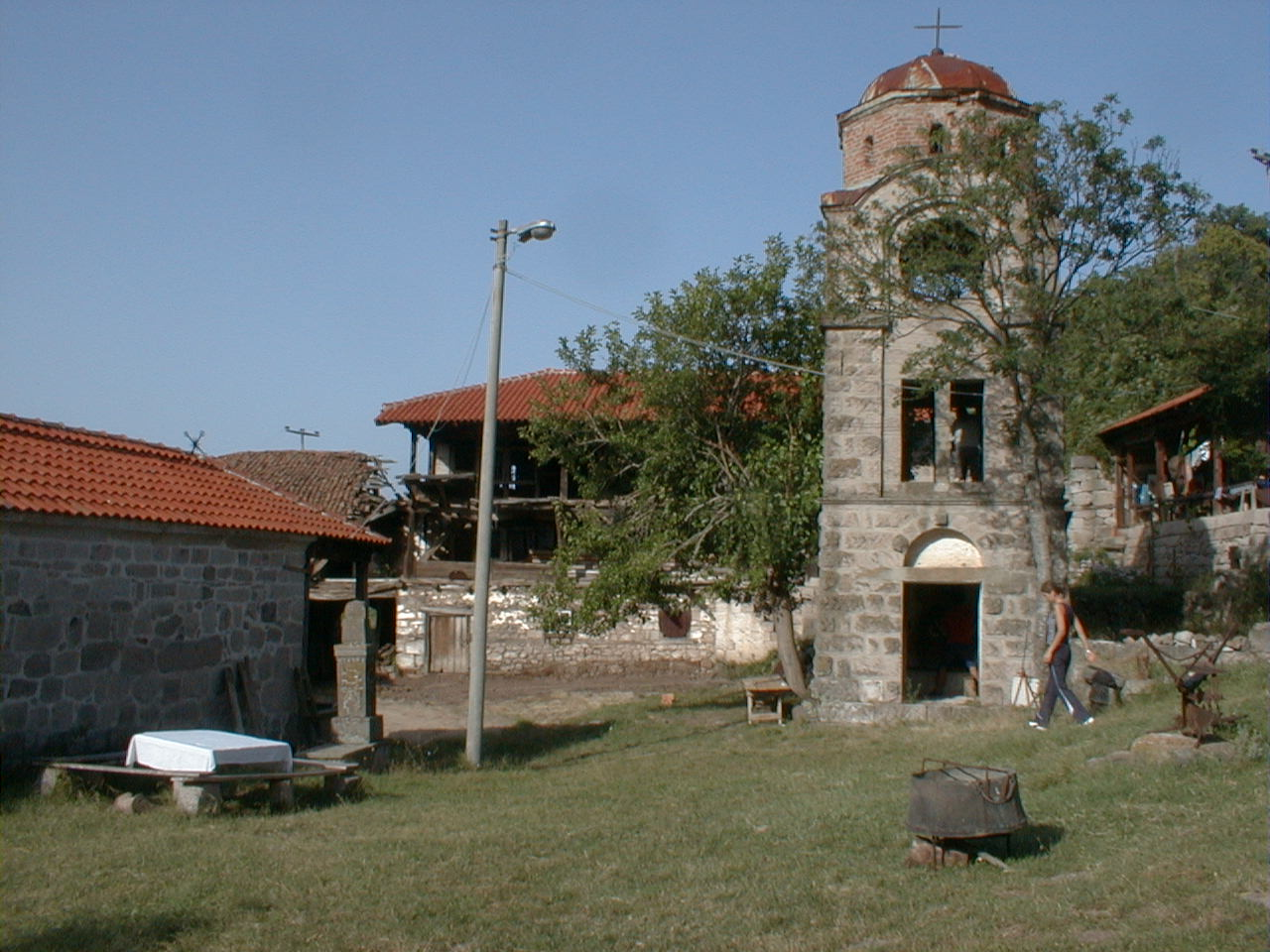
Monastery Karpino

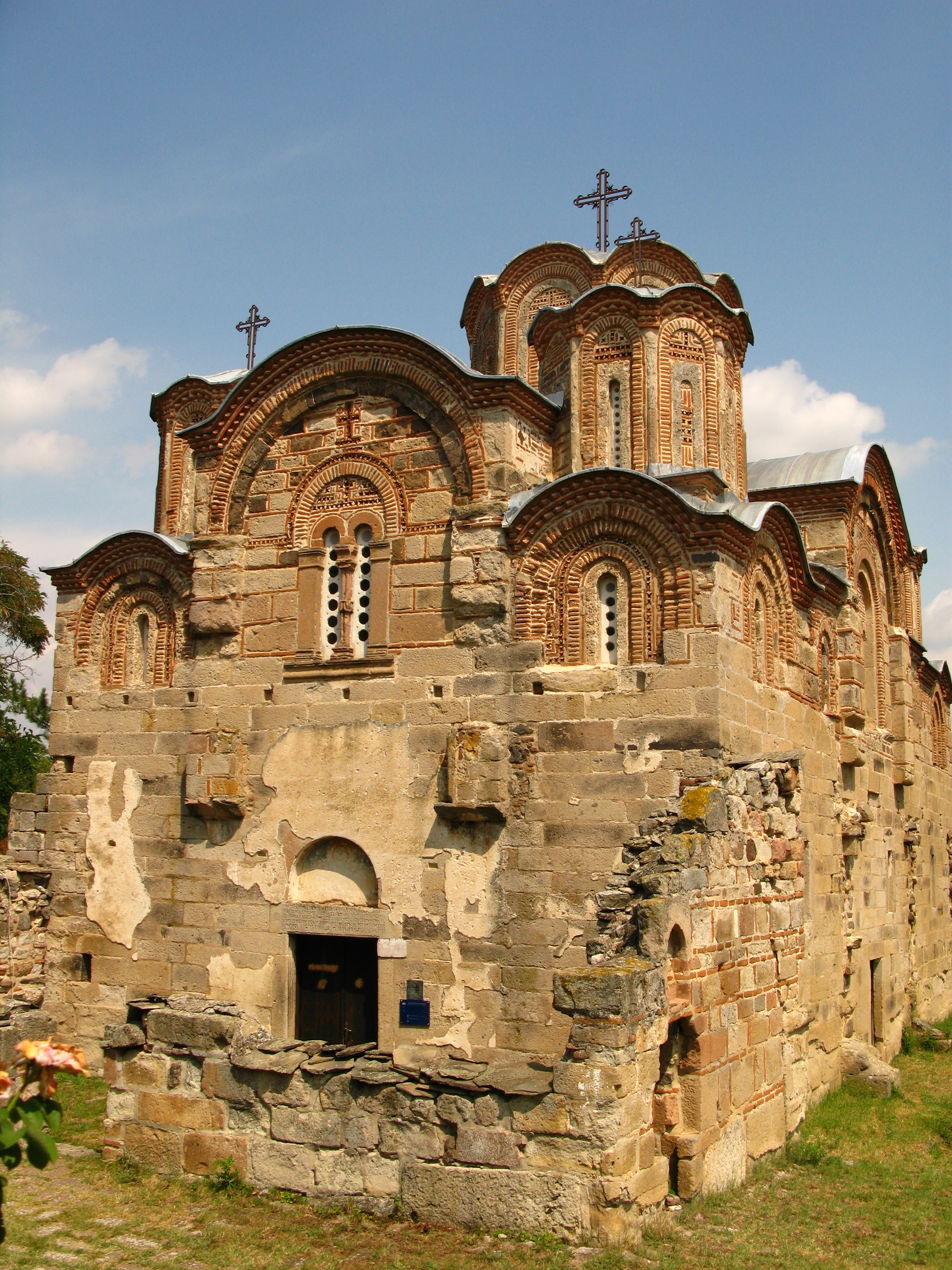
St. George

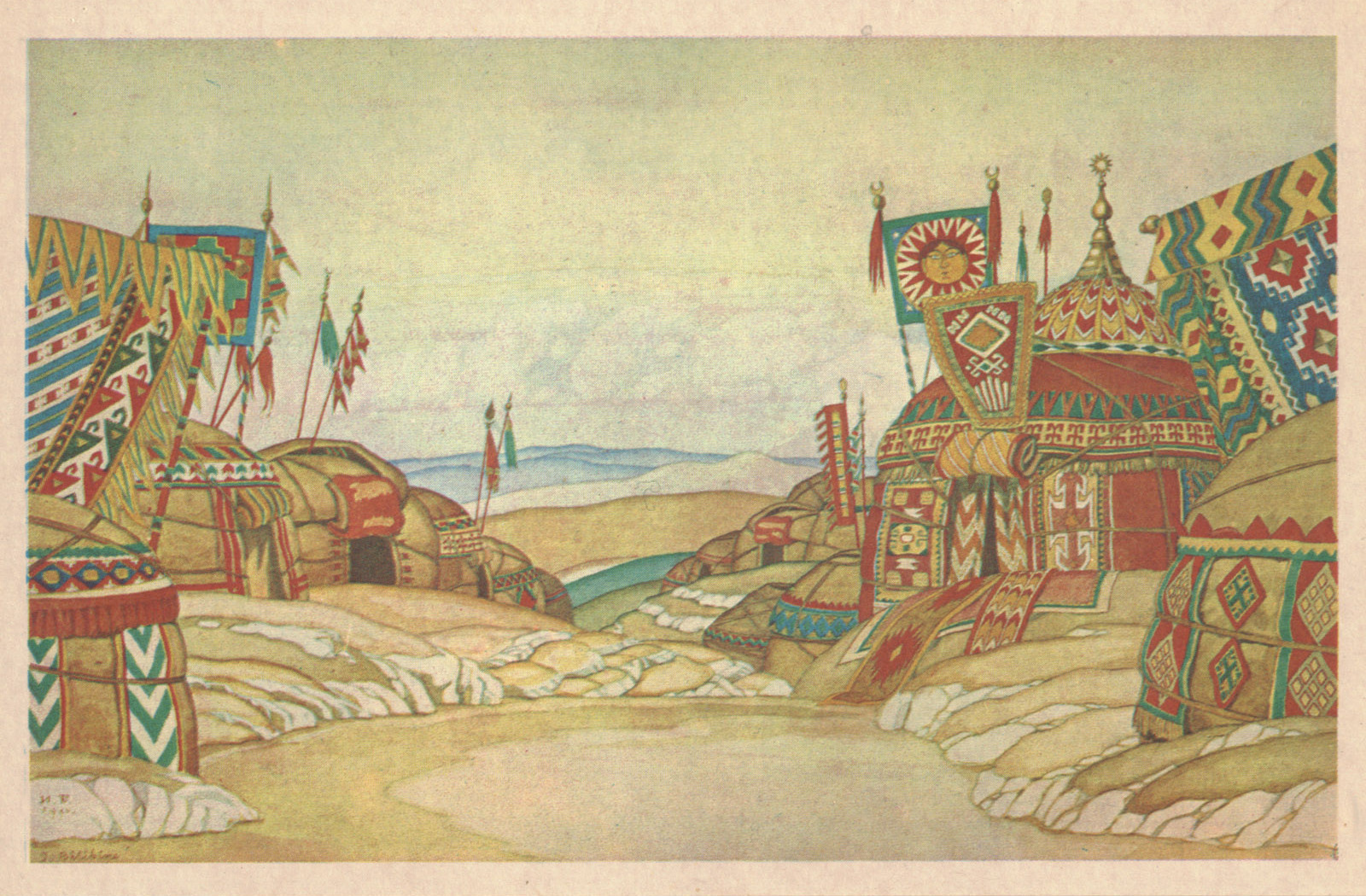
Cumans

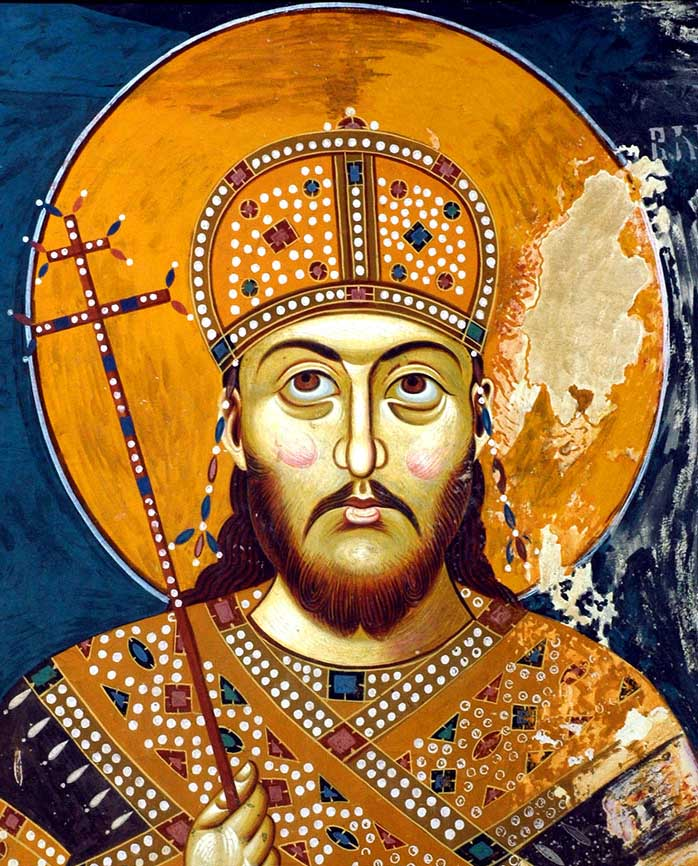
Emperor Stefan Dušan

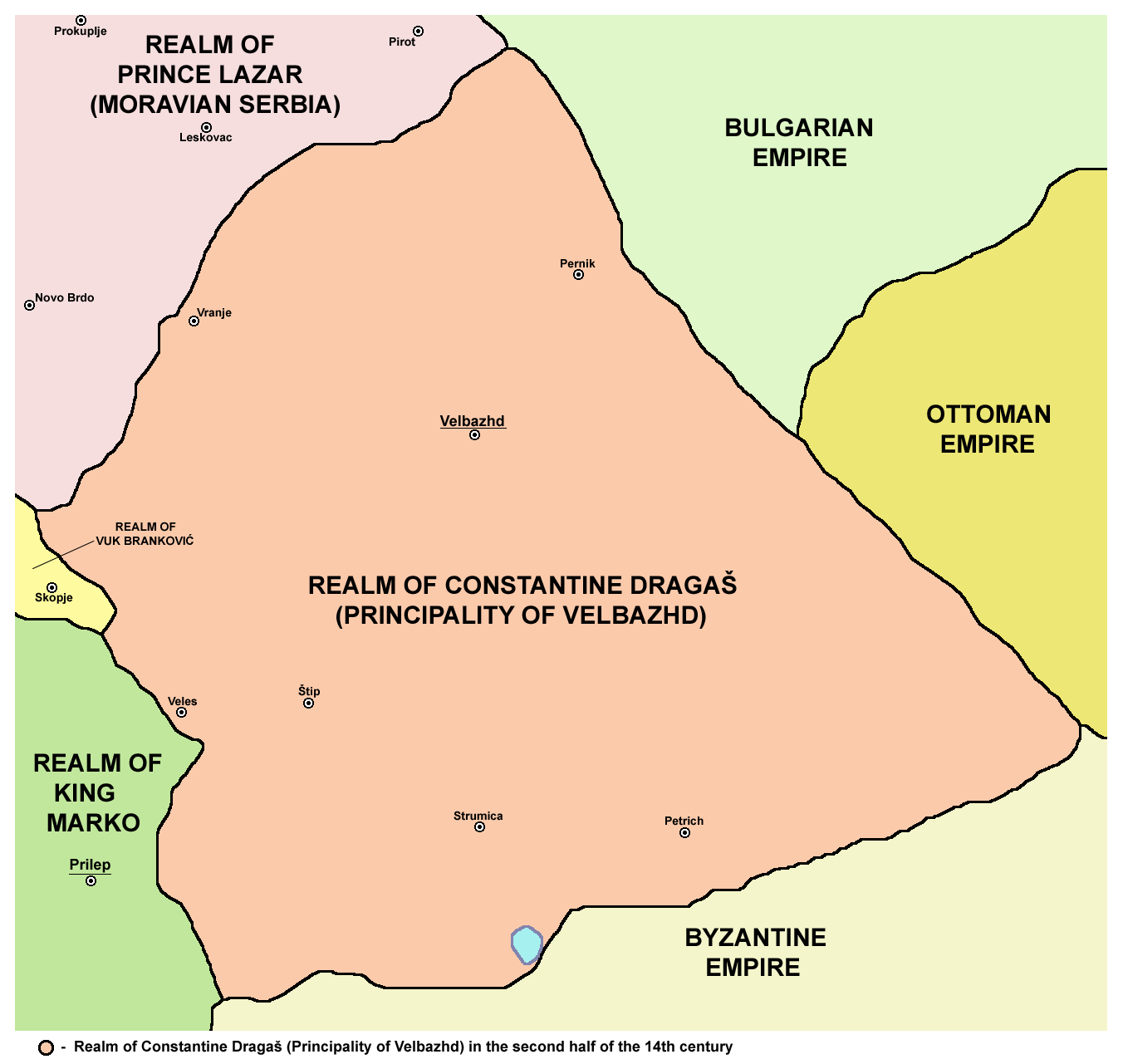
Principality of Velbazhd
- old Žegligovo settlement established
- 836-1018 under First Bulgarian Empire
- 1018–1204 under Byzantine Empire
- 1020 Basil II in Kozjak established local episcopate from Archbishopric of Ohrid
- 1071 St. George monastery built
- 1094 Cumani tribe settled the area (It's believed the name Kumanovo came from this tribe)
- 1207–1217 under Second Bulgarian Empire
- 1313 Matejče Monastery built
- 1346–1371 under Serbian Empire
- 14th century Karpino Monastery built
- 1373–1395 under Principality of Velbazhd

== Ottoman Empire ==
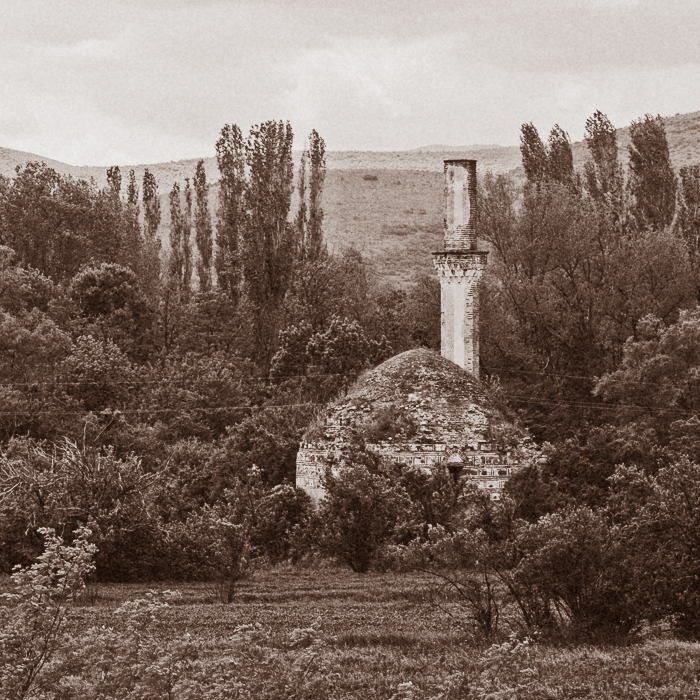
Kodza Mehmet Beg Mosque

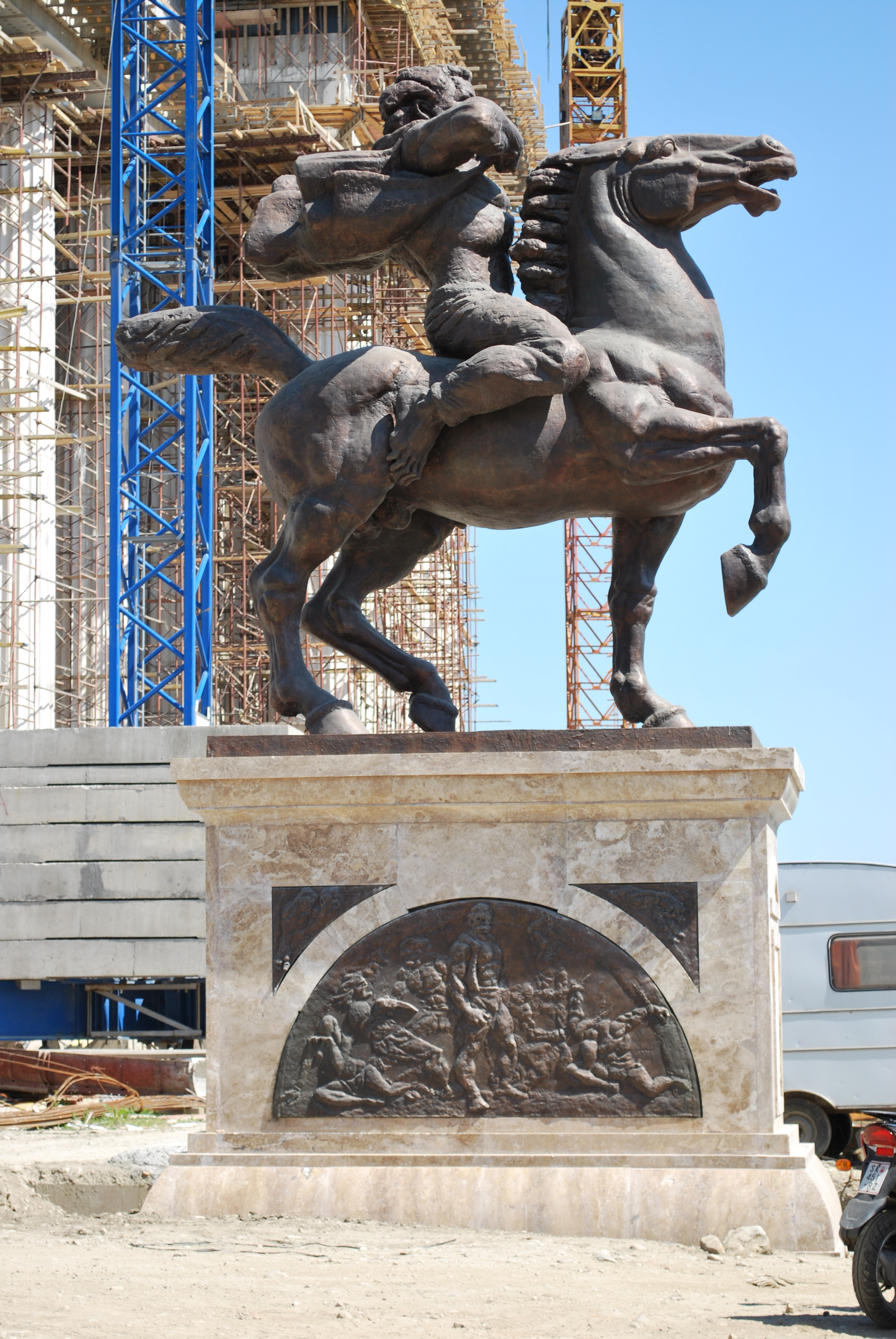
Karposh

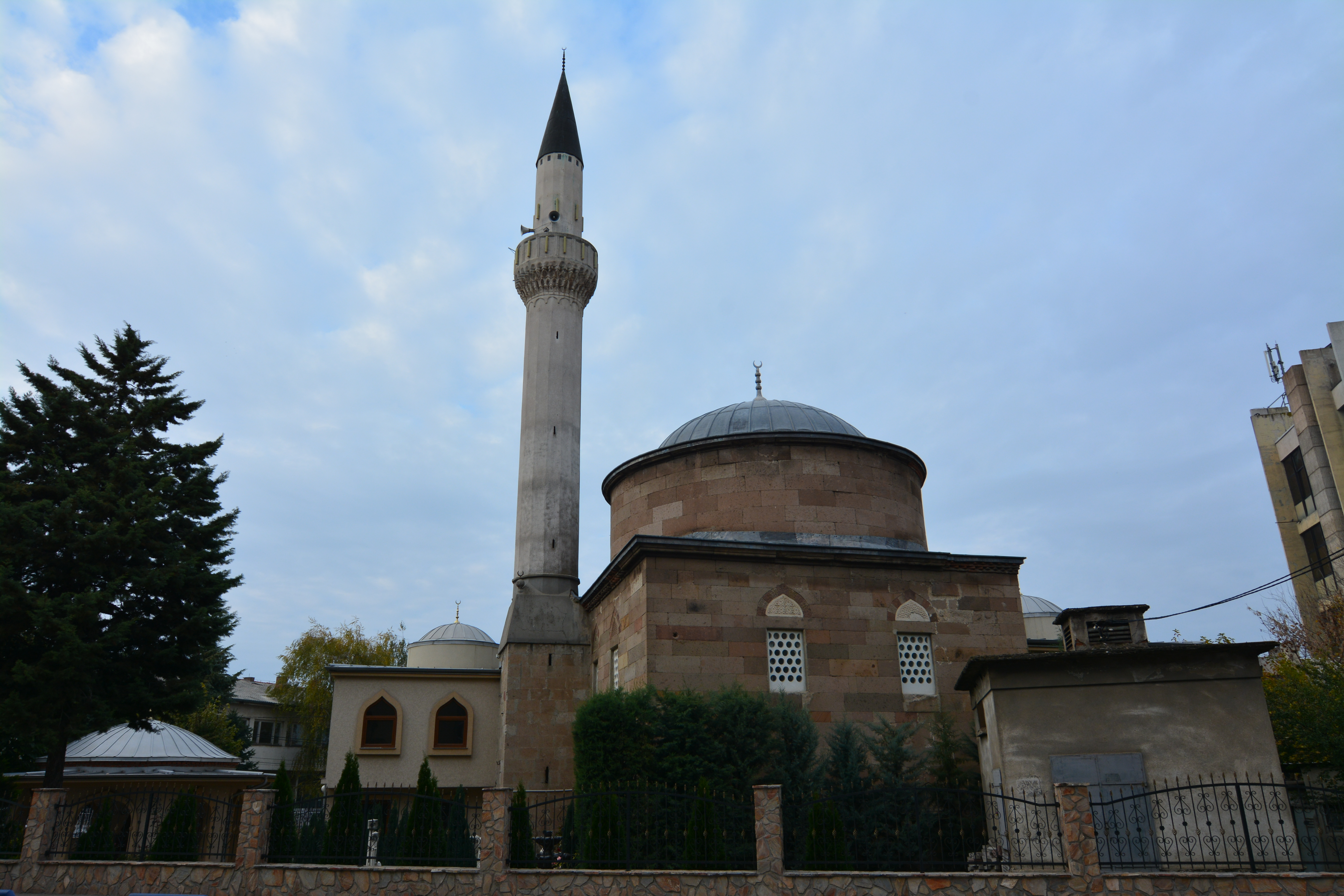
Eski Mosque

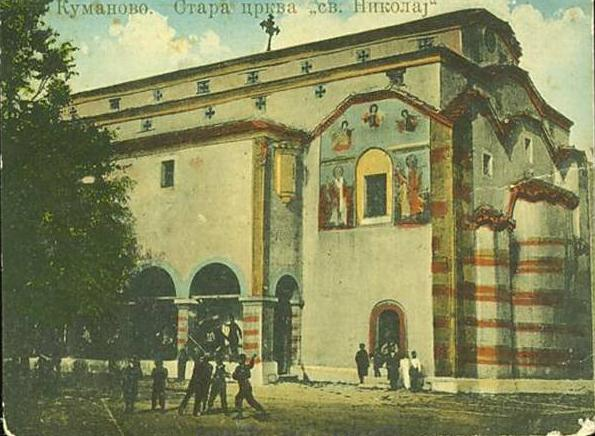
St. Nikolas

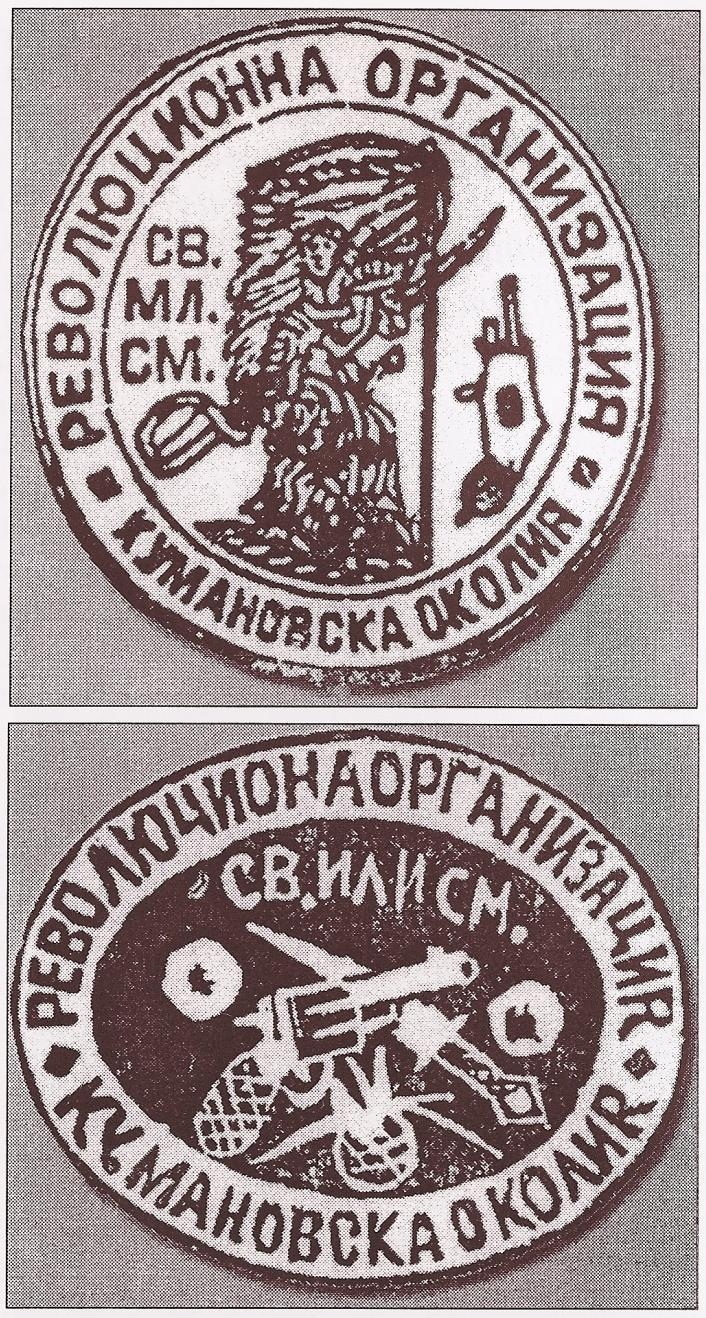
VMRO seal

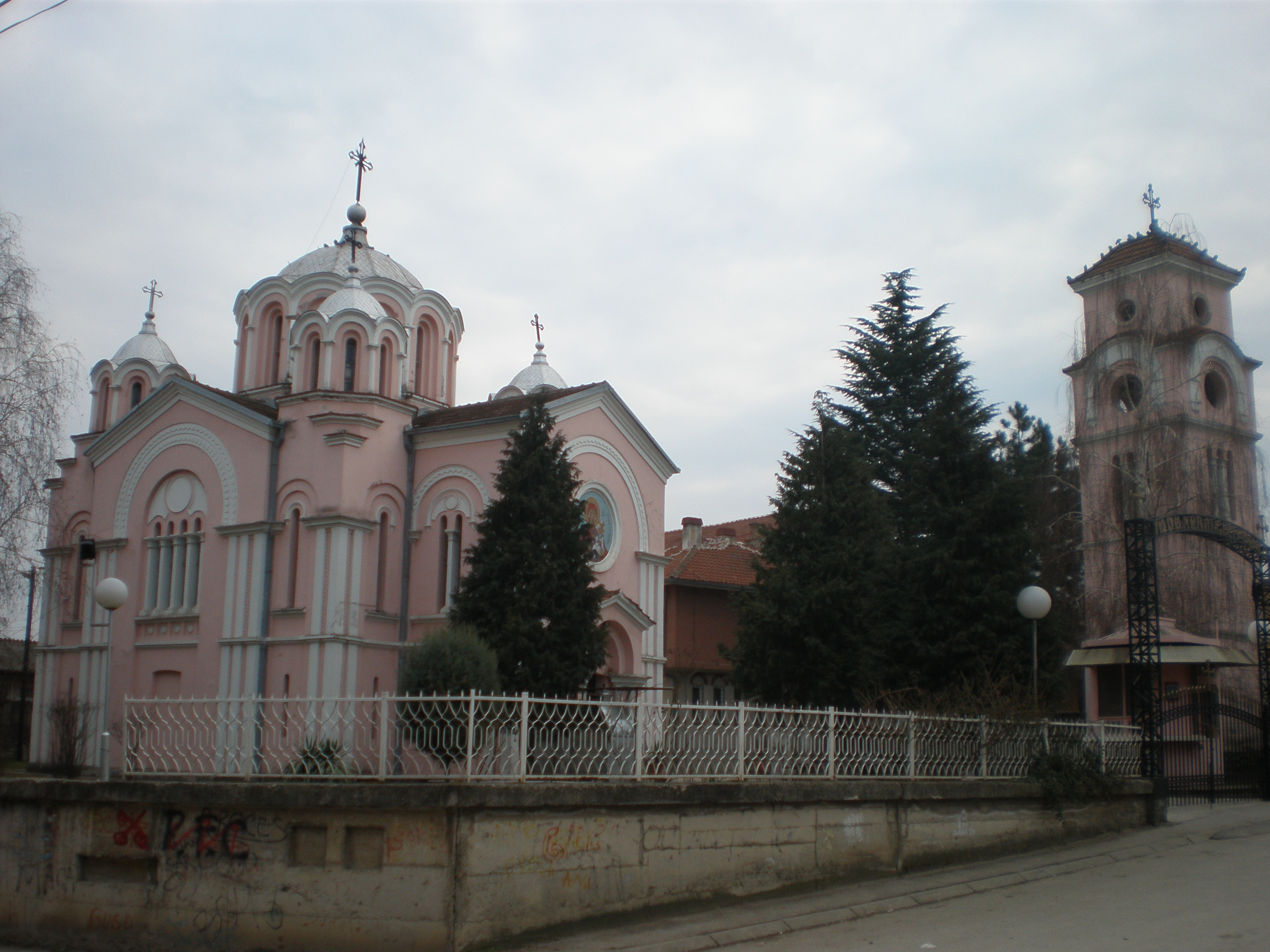
Holy Trinity
- (1395–1912) Kumanovo under Ottoman Empire
- 1415 Halit Efendi Mosque built
- 1463 under Sanjak of Skopje until 1912
- 16th century Karpino Monastery built
- 1519 First time the name Kumanovo appears in documents
- 1586/96 Kodza Mehmet Beg Mosque built
- 1660 Evlija Celebi visits Kumanovo
- 1689
  - Karposh's Rebellion
  - Kumanovo Fortress built
  - Selim I Giray retakes Kumanovo
- 18th century Kumanovo Clock Tower built
- 1751 Eski Mosque built
- 1773 Jusuf Efendi Mosque built
- 1805 Gavril Kratovac established the first school
- 1810 population: 800 by: Gomera
- 1833 Dimitrije Mladenovich established as Protoiereus
- 1835 population: 5,000 by: Dupničanin
- 1851 St. Nicholas church built
- 1867 Kosovo Vilayet (Kumanovo Kaza) established (Vali Ibrahim Edhem Pasha)
- 1873 Kumanovo is connected by rail with Solun
- 1877 Kosovo Vilayet established
- 1878 (Principality of Serbia) Kumanovo Uprising
- 1885 population: 7,000 by: Bjankoni
- 1894 IMRO organize a committee in Kumanovo in the house of Jordan Jovčev
- 1899 Goce Delchev visits Kumanovo

=== 1900–1912 ===
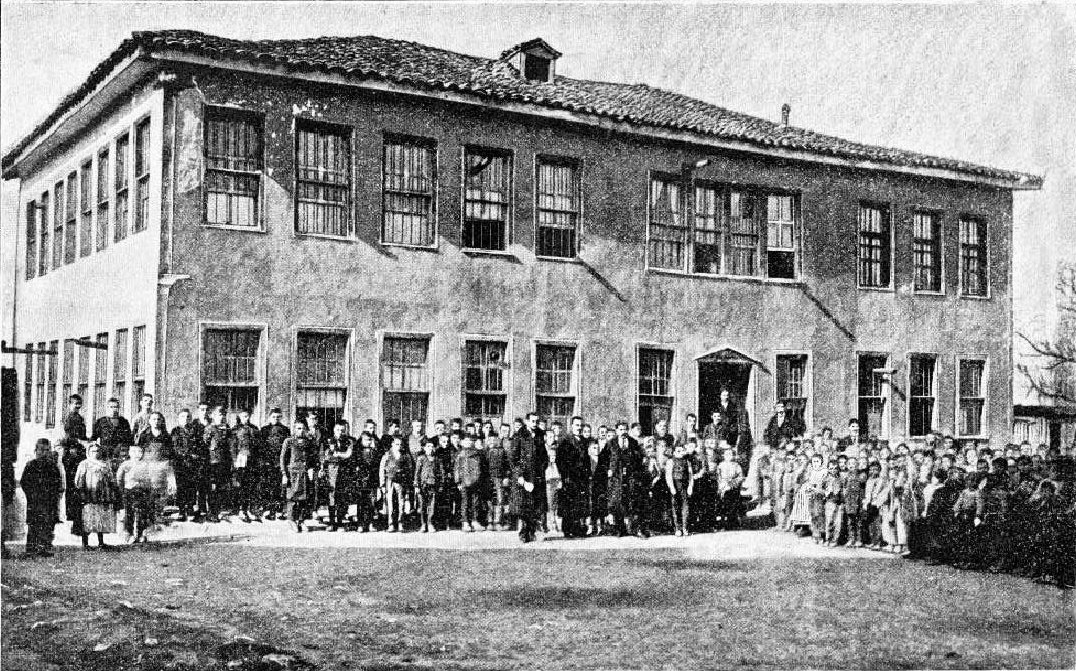
Bulgarian exarchist school in Kumanovo 1900–1910

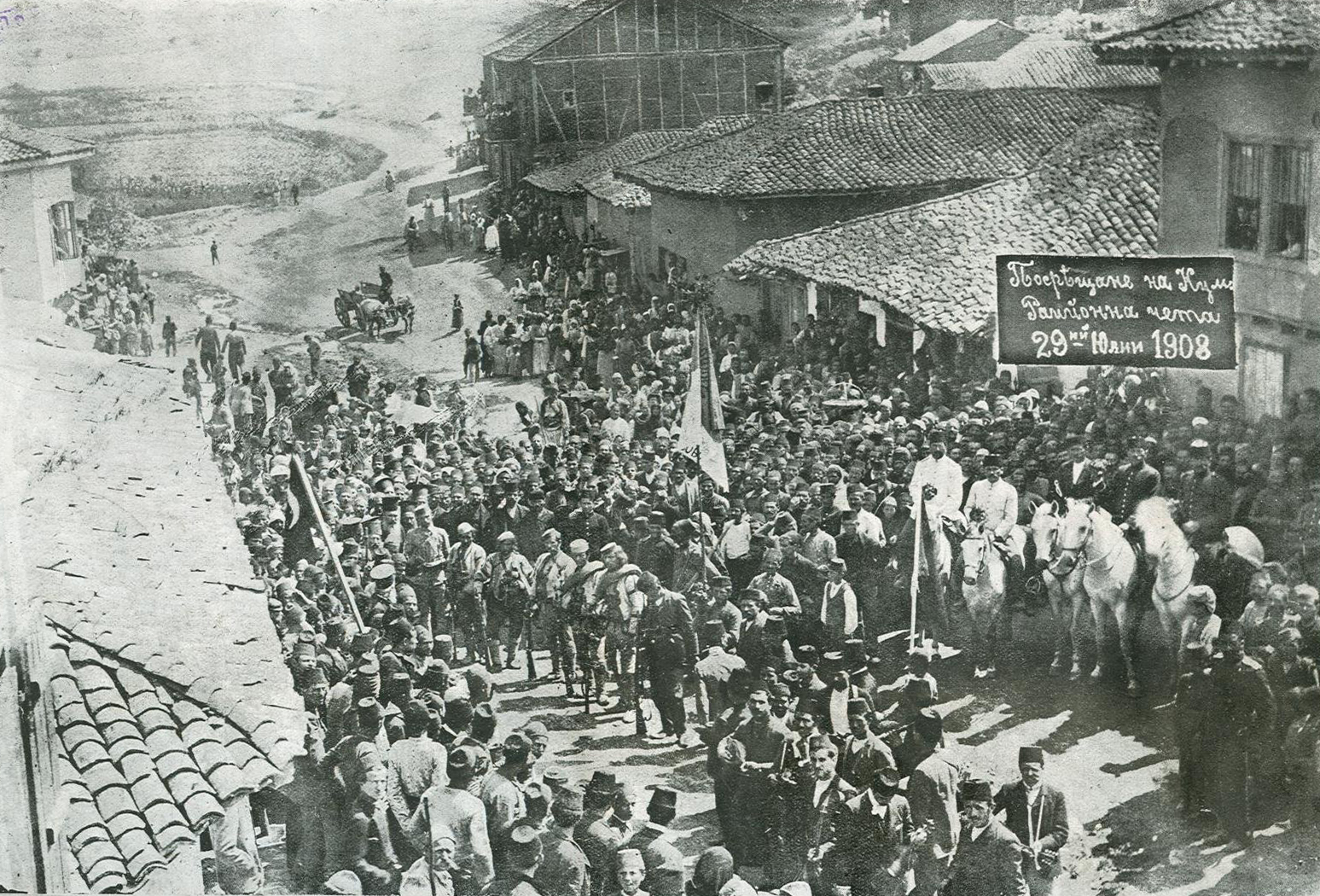
Krustio Lazarov's Cheta in Kumanovo, 1908
- 1900 population: 14,530 by: Knčev
- 1902 Holy Trinity church built
- 1903 Vlach school established
- 1904 Fight on Šuplji Kamen
- 1905
  - Fight in Tabanovce
  - Fight on Čelopek
- 1907 population: 15,000 by: Hadzi Vasiljevič

== Balkan Wars ==
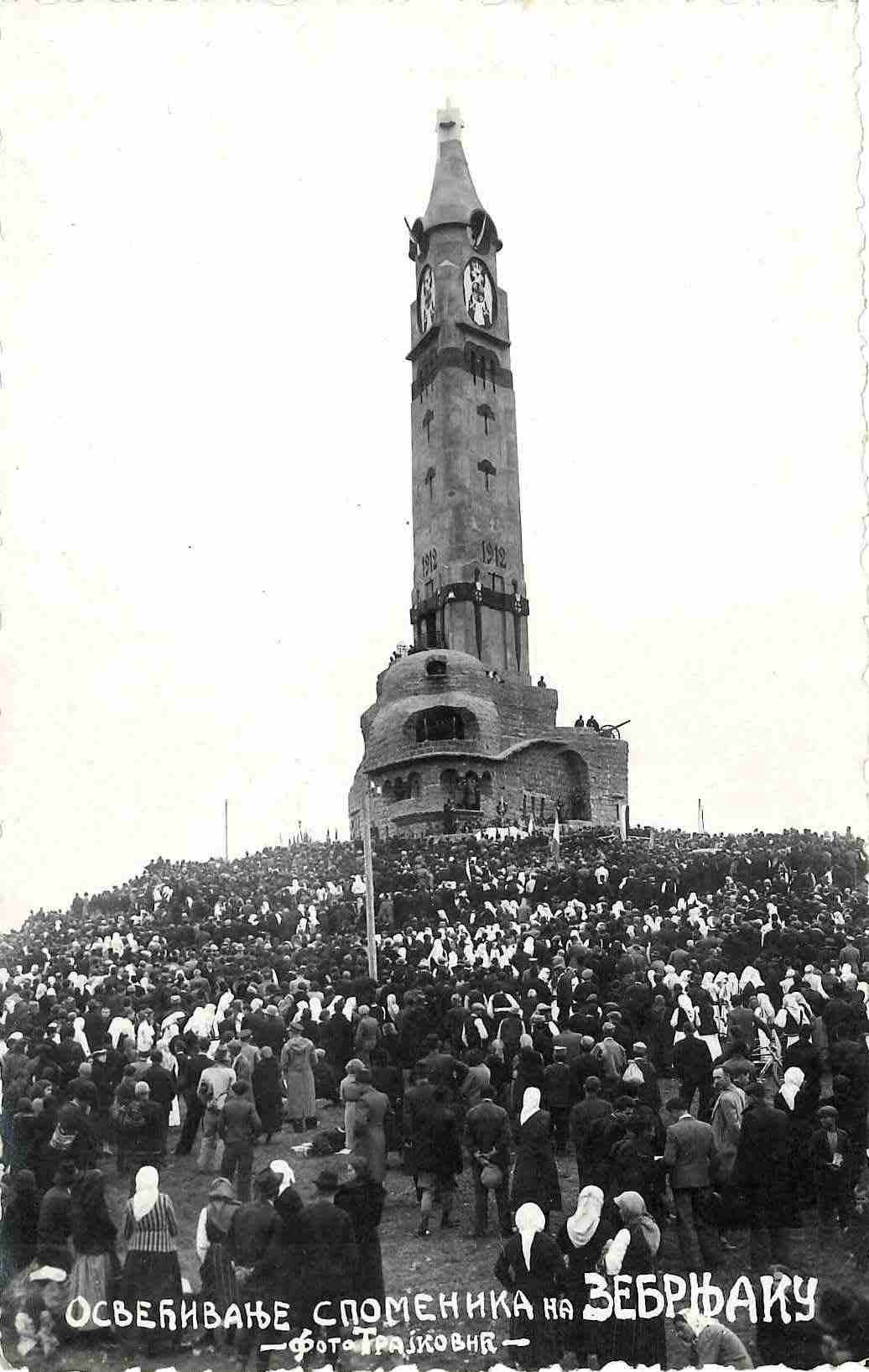
Monument Zebrnjak

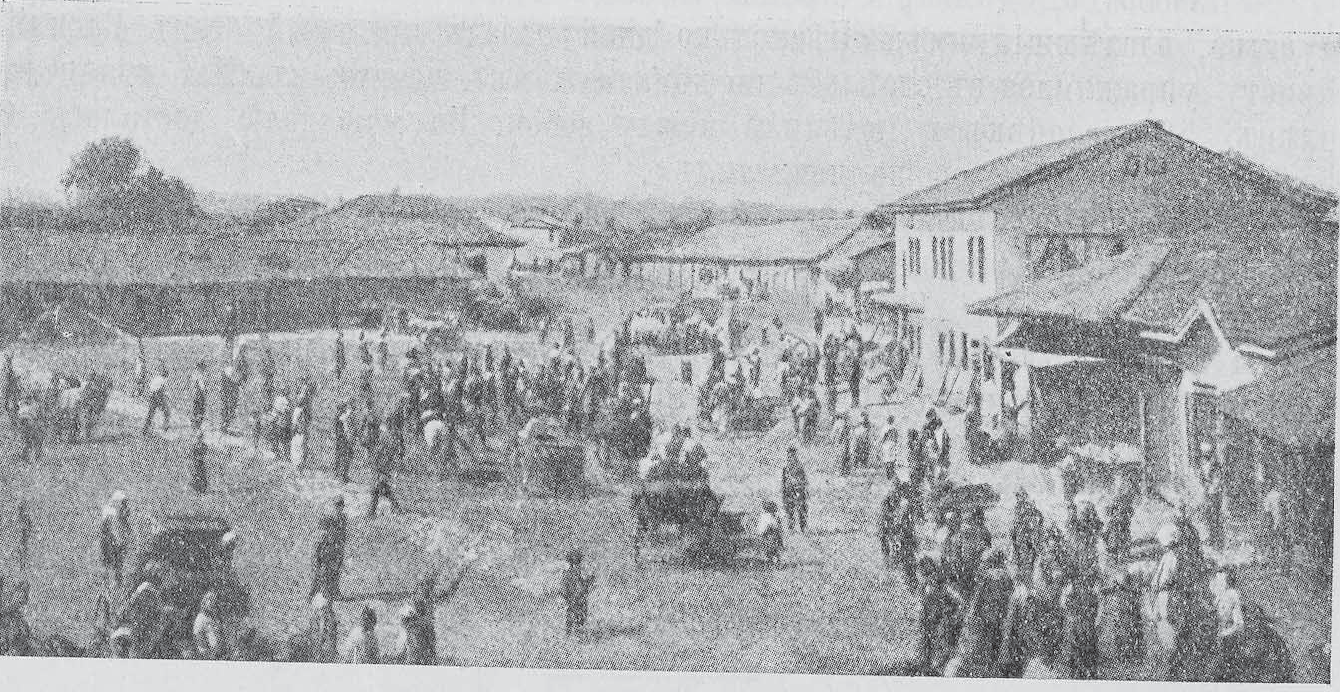
Kumanovo, c. 1913

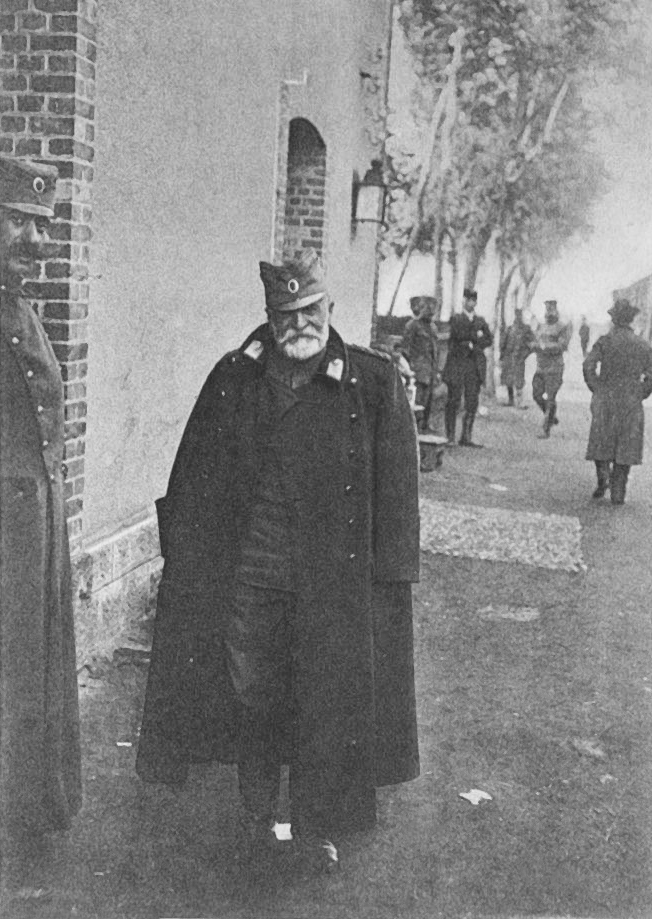
Radomir Putnik Kumanovo Railway Station 1912
- 1912 Battle of Kumanovo Kingdom of Serbia vs. Ottoman Empire
- 1913 under Kingdom of Serbia, see Treaty of London

== First World War ==
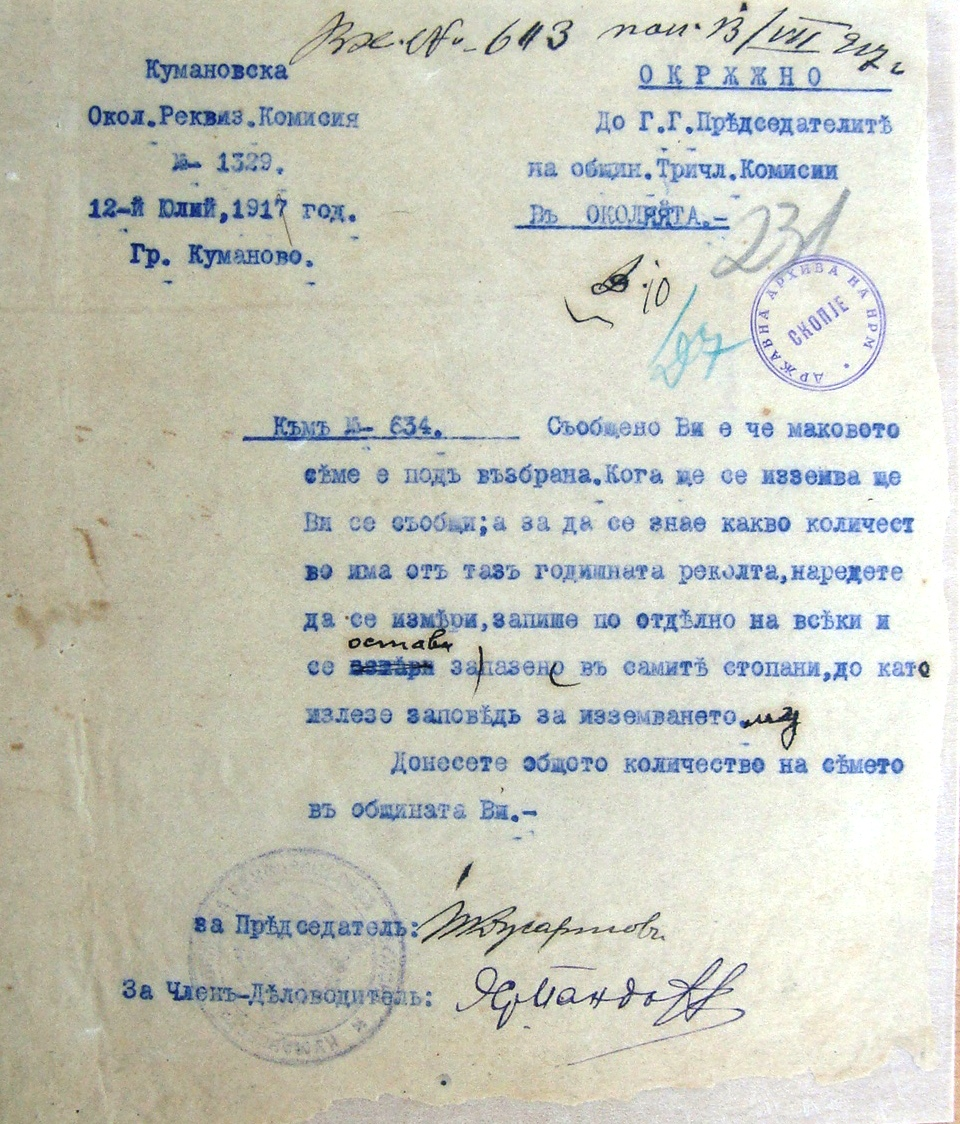
Poppy grow band, 1917
- 1915,
  - 9 Oct 1915 – 24 Sep 1918 under Bulgaria, (Georgi Stojanov Todorov, Racho Petrov Stojanov, Stefan Toshev Toshev)
  - Ovče Pole Offensive
- 1918 under Serbia
- 1919 May 6, Boro Menkov birth

== Kingdom of Yugoslavia ==
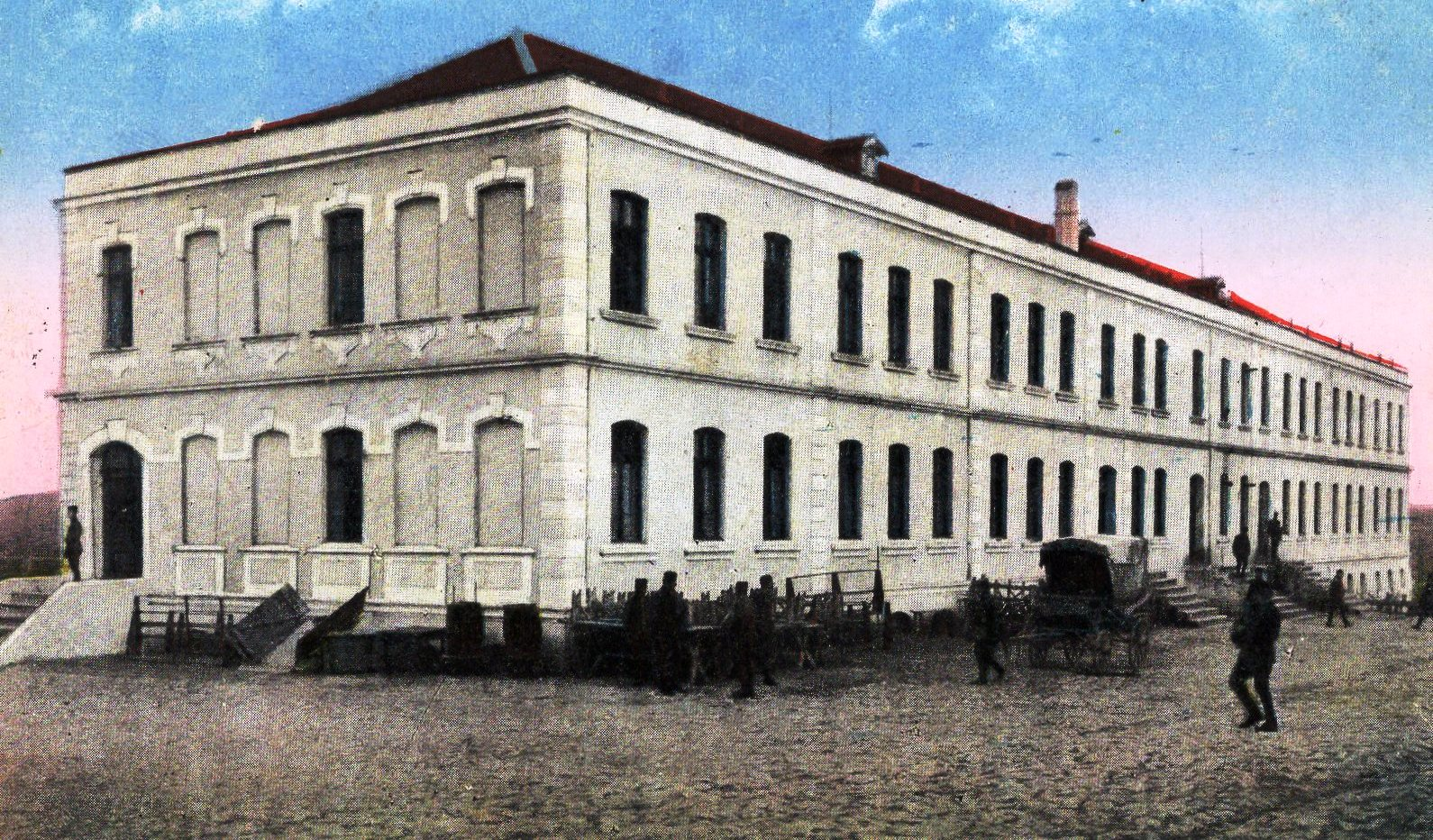
Barracks of 22 Serbian Infantry Regiment, 1928

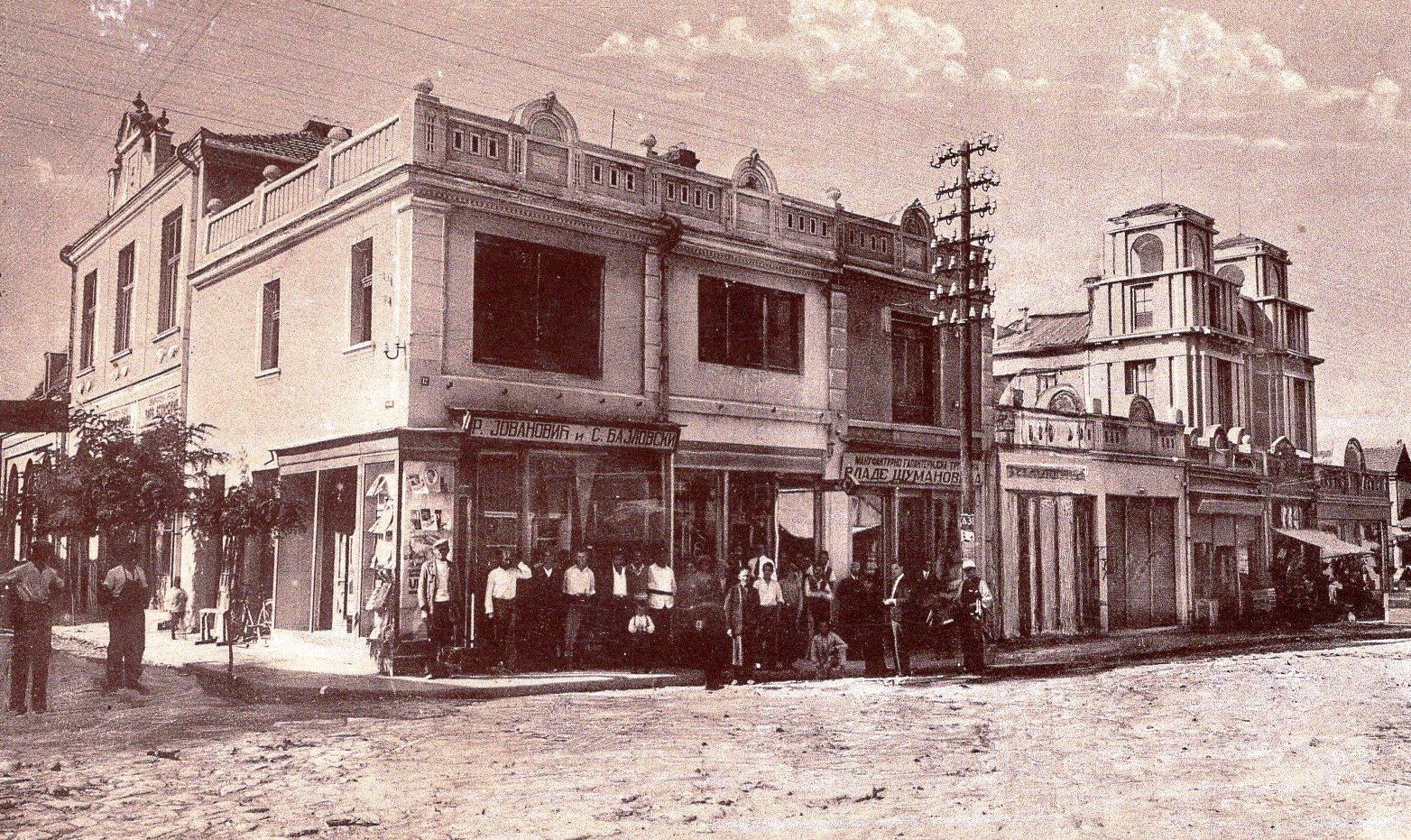
Kumanovo 1930s

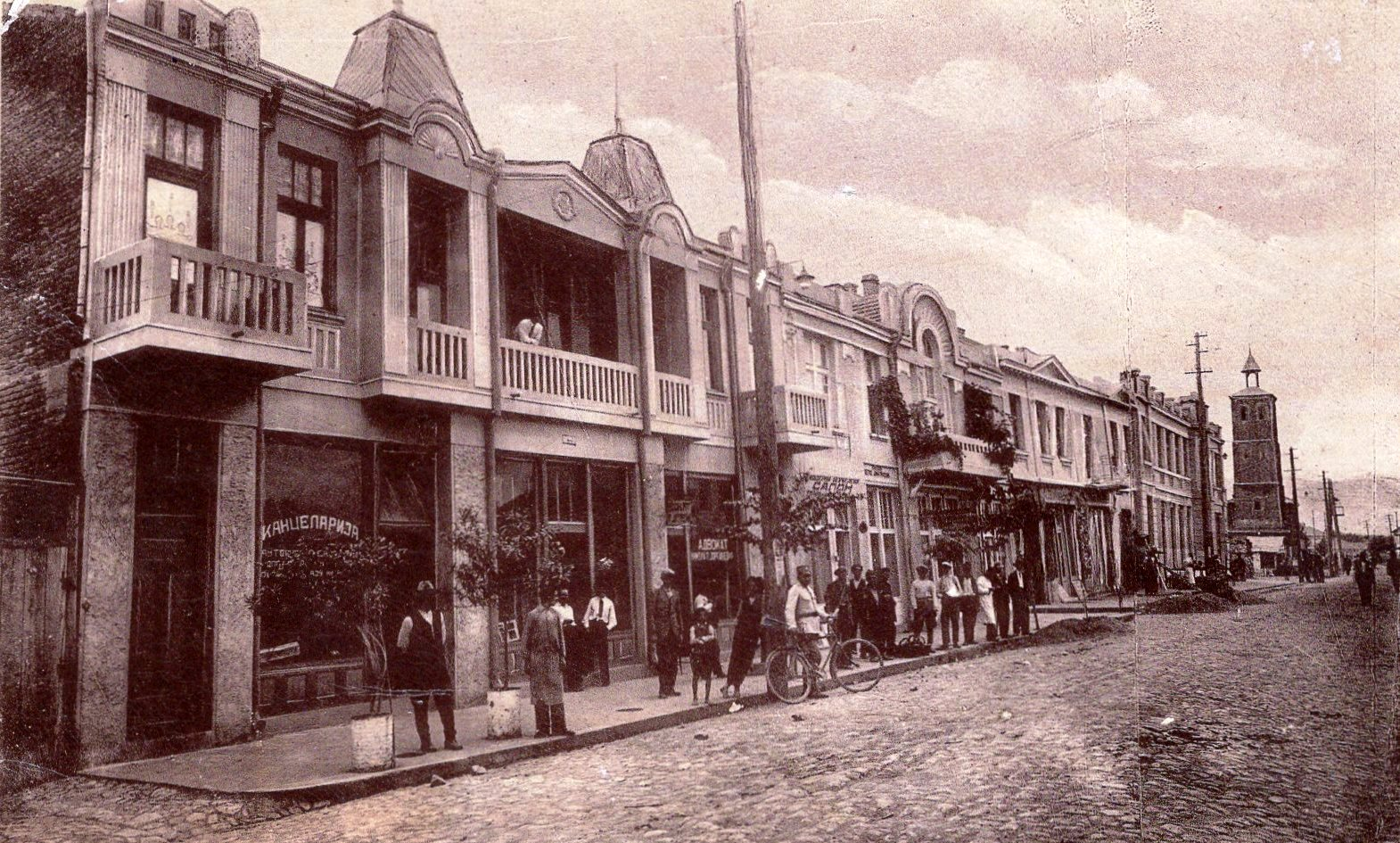
Kumanovo 1930s

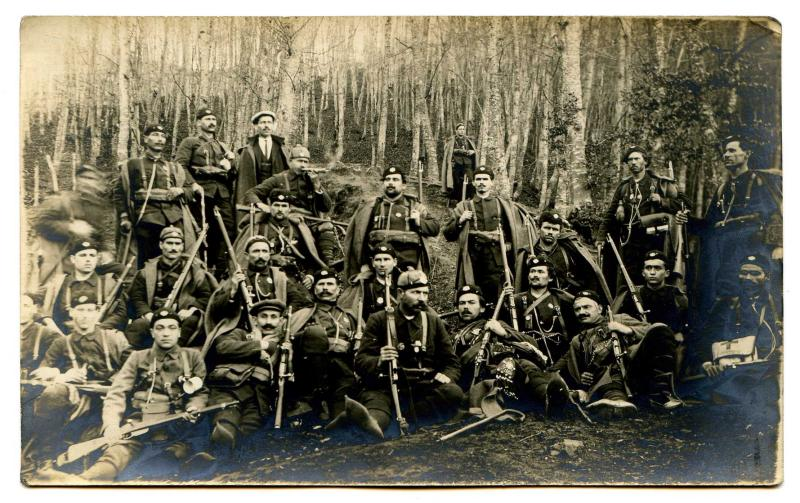
Kumanovo and Skopie chetas IMARO
- 1920 FK Shparta established
- 1921
  - Gymnasium established
  - Hristijan Todorovski Karpoš birth
- 1922 October 14, Bajram Shabani birth
- 1923 June 28, construction started of Sports Hall Sokolana
- 1924 FK Kumanovo established
- 1926
  - Electricity arrived
  - Church St. Petka built
- 1928
  - Lenche Kumanovche published
- 1929
  - 9 Oct. Vardar Banovina established
  - Kjira Manevich elected mayor
- 1930 Zanaetchiski Dom established
- 1931
  - Sports Hall Sokolana built
  - Momchilo Jovanovski born
- 1934
  - Two public execution in Kumanovo
  - Town Hospital established, gift from Nikola Spasich
- 1937 Zebrnjak monument built

== Second World War ==
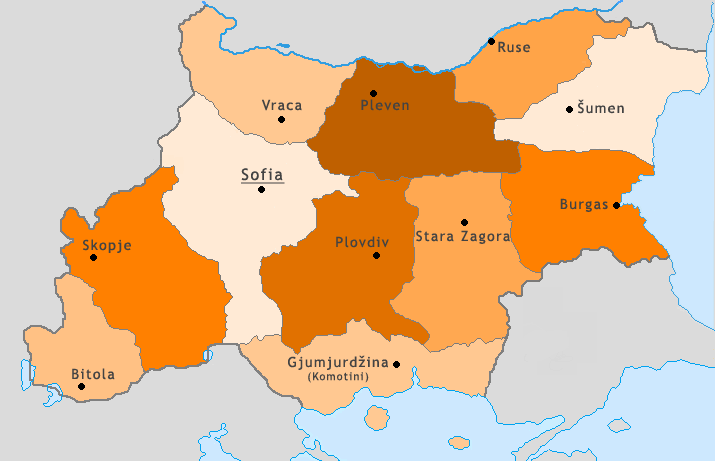
Map of Bulgaria WWII

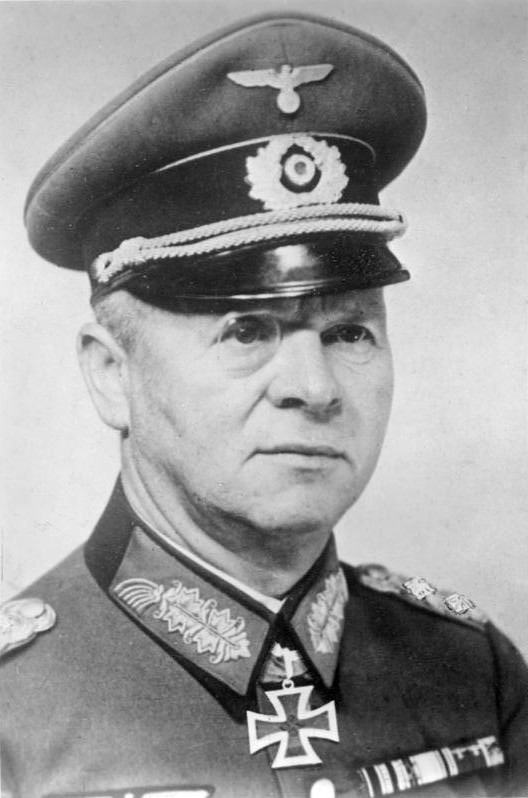
Georg Stumme

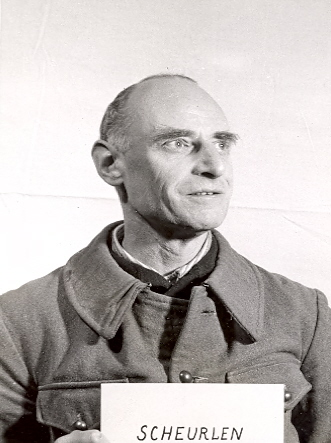
Heinz Scheurlen

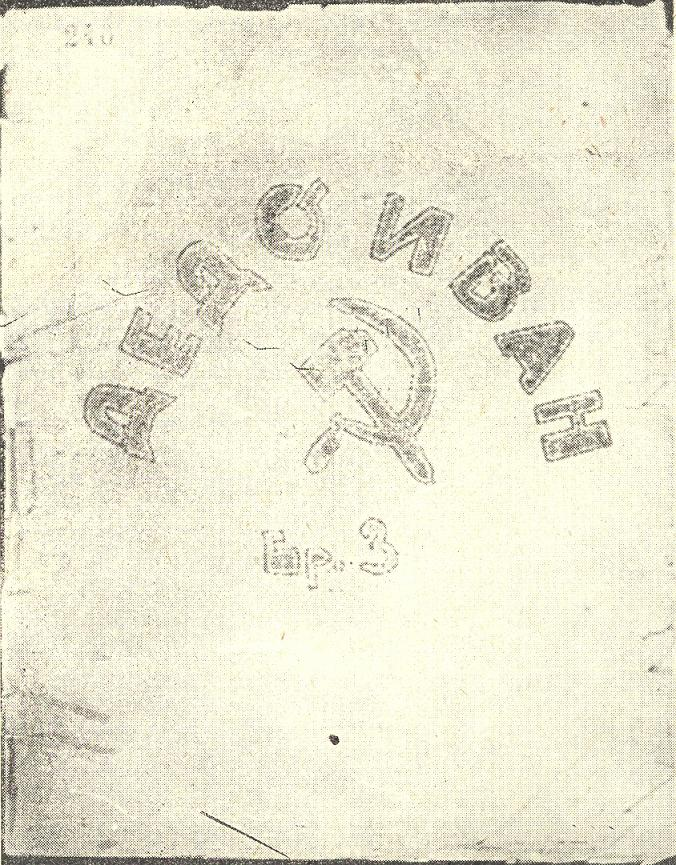
Dedo Ivan

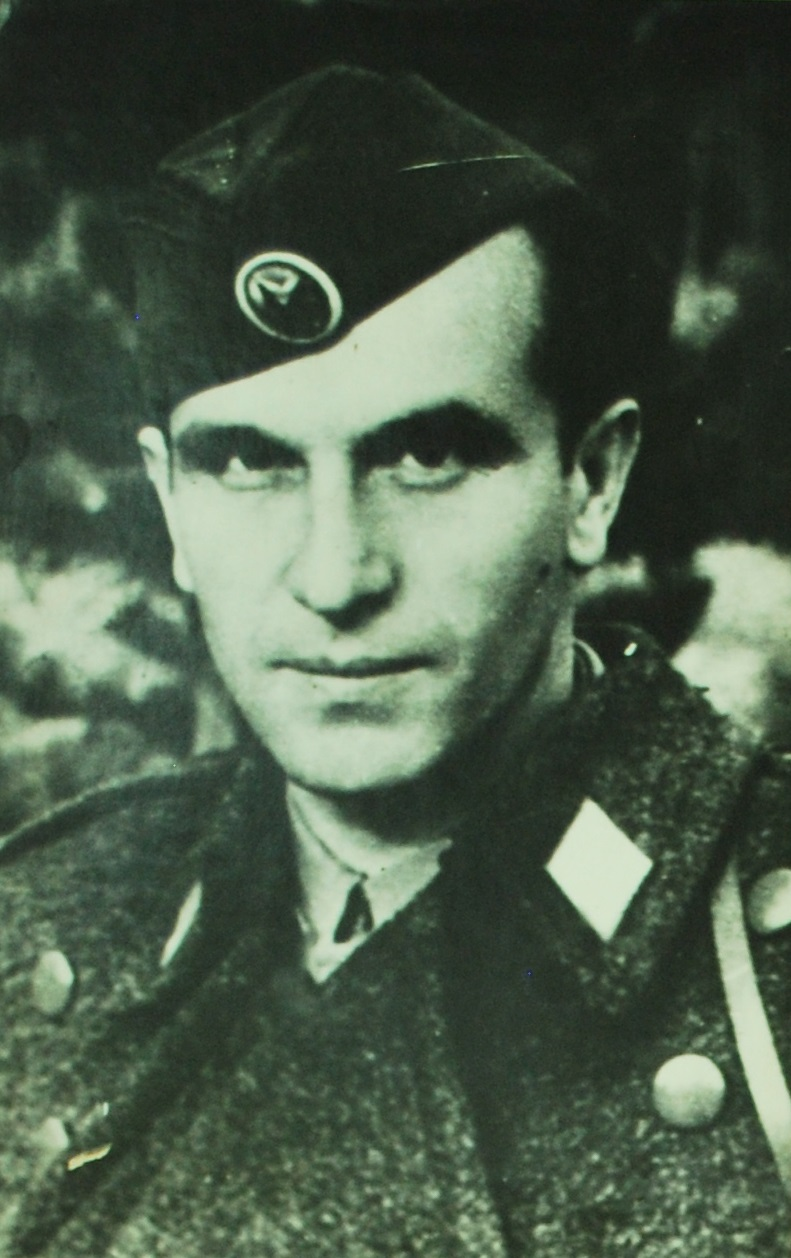
M. Apostolski

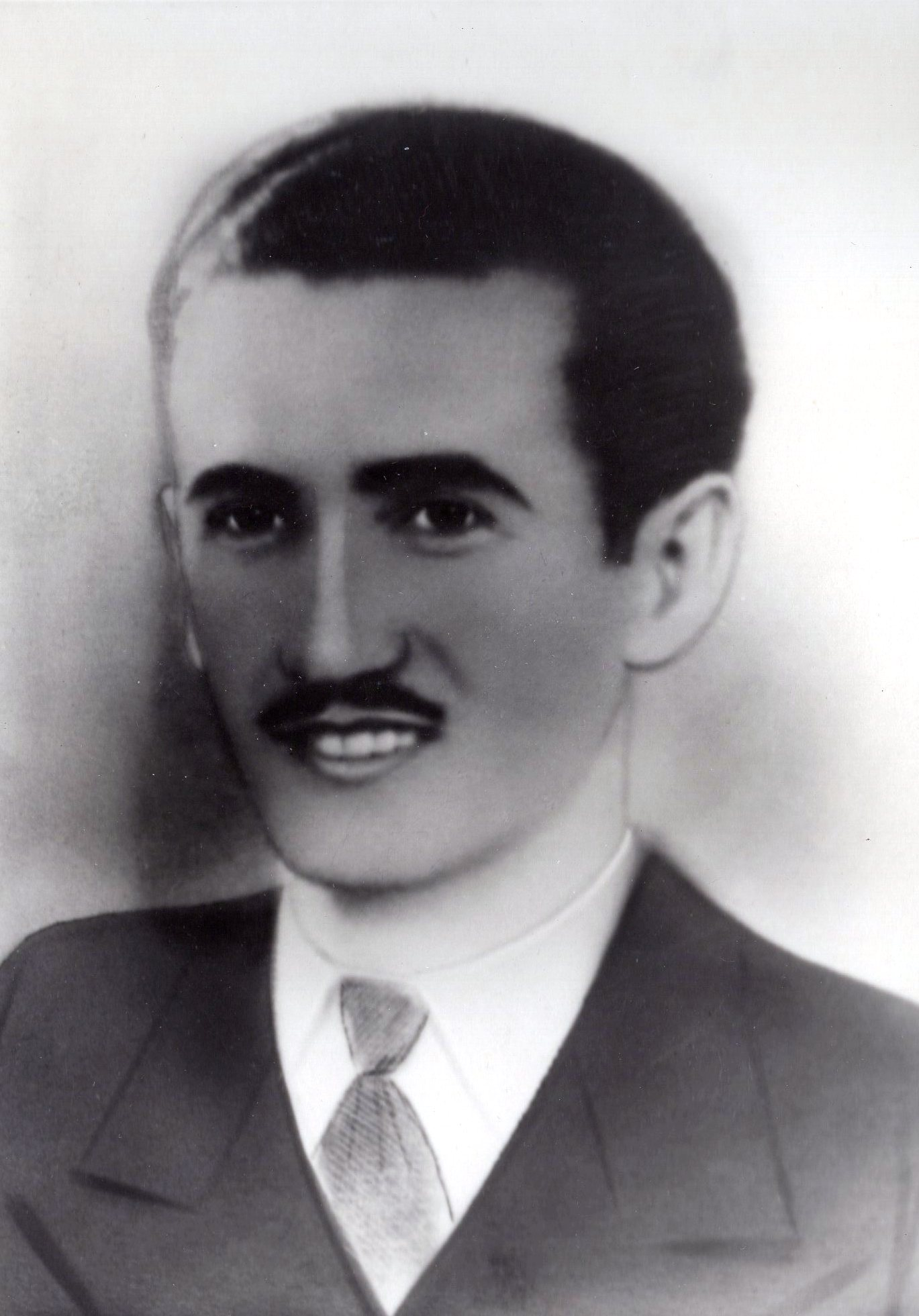
Boro Menkov

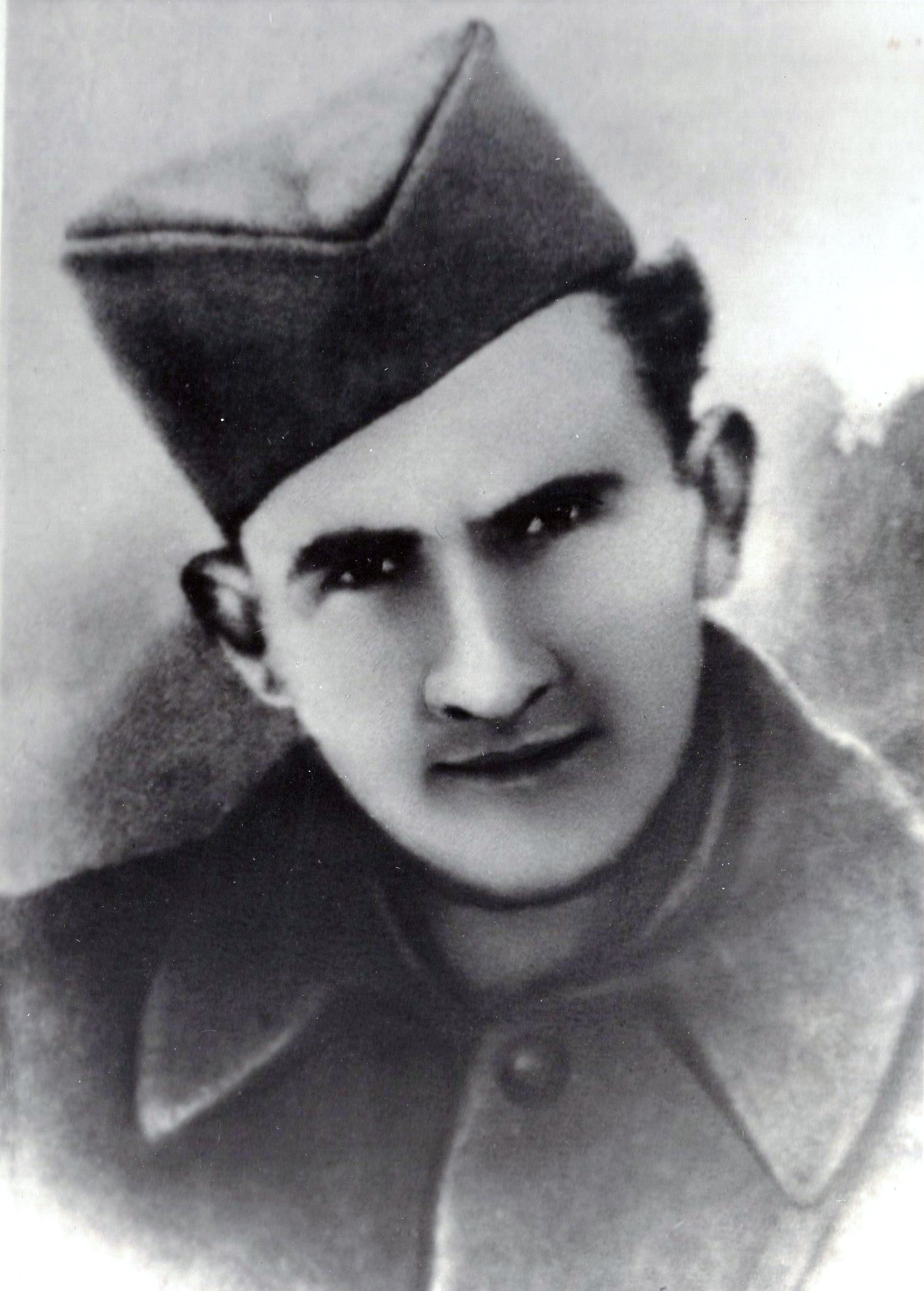
Hristijan Todorovski

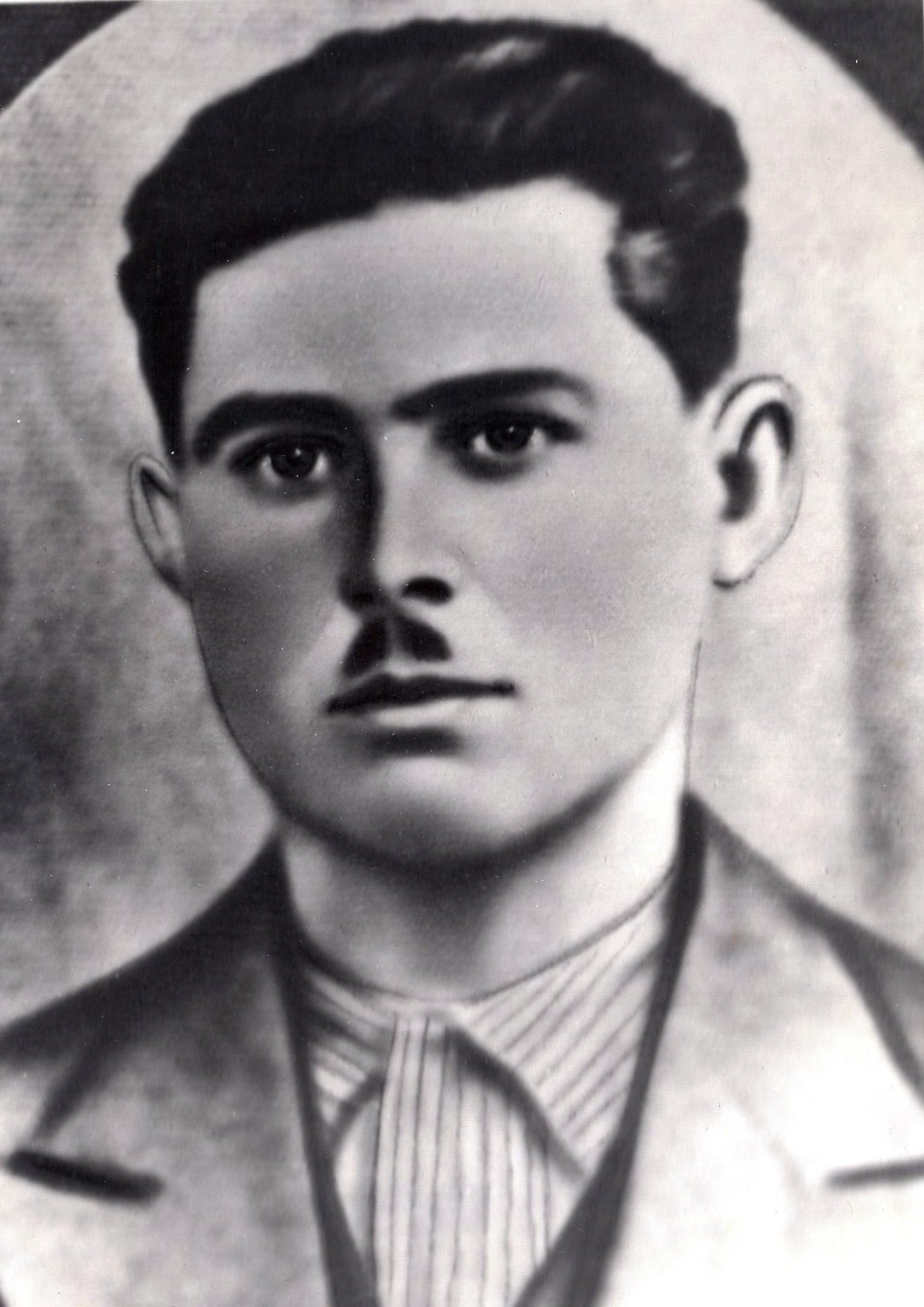
Bajram Shabani
- 1941
  - 8 Apr – 19 Apr, under Nazi Germany (Georg Stumme)
  - 19 Apr 1941 – 7 Sep 1944 under Bulgaria (Nikola Mihov Mikhailov, Anton Kozarov, Dimităr Raev, Toma Petrov)
  - 11 October Anti-fascist insurrection started
  - 14 October Boro Menkov Killed in Action
  - 14 October Bajram Shabani Killed in Action
  - Dedo Ivan newspaper established
  - Oktobris newspaper established
- 1944
  - 7 Sep – 12 Nov, under Nazi Germany (Heinz Scheurlen, Karl Hubert Lanz )
  - February March
  - Hristijan Todorovski Karpoš killed

== Socialist Republic of Macedonia ==
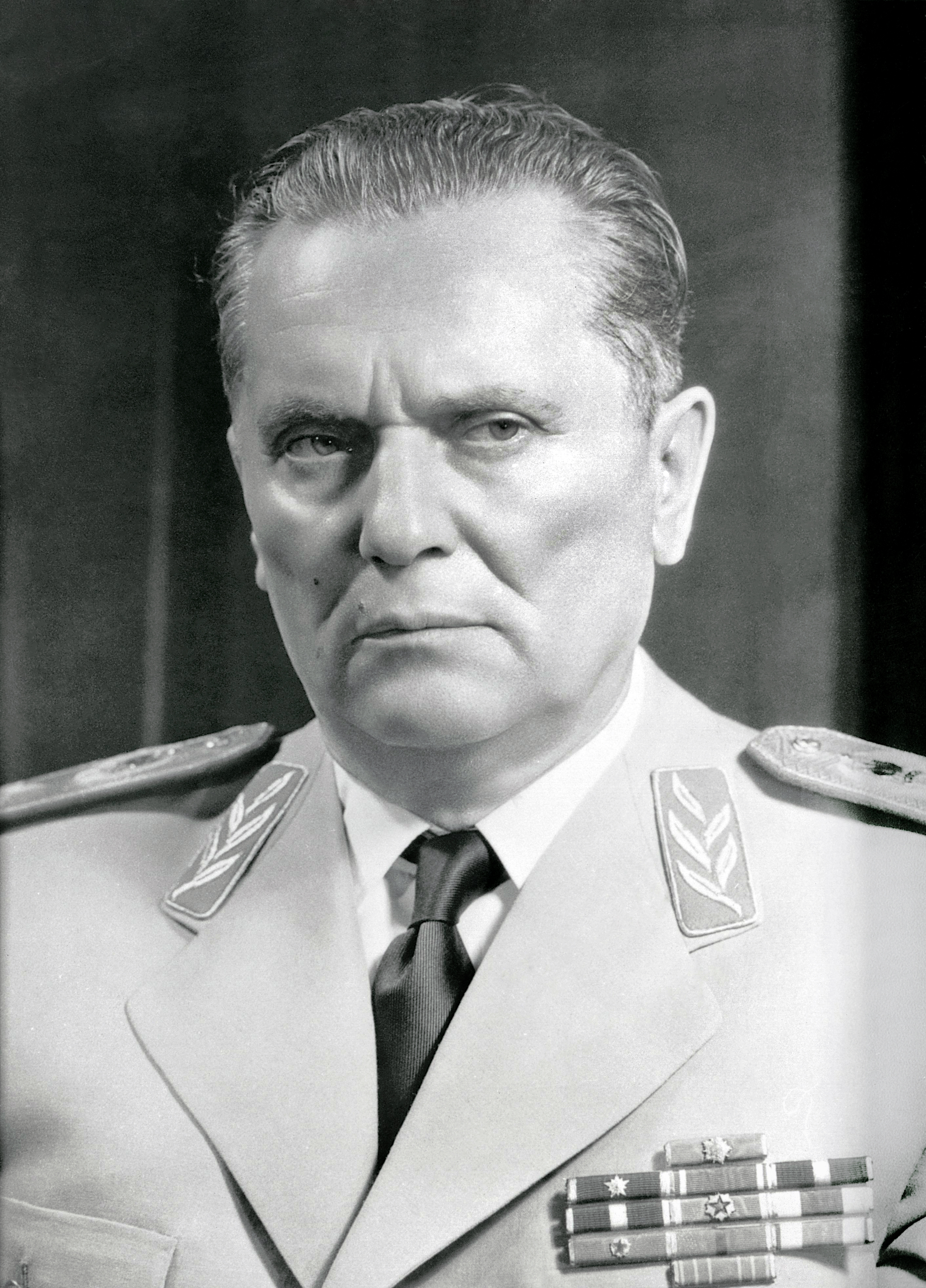
Tito

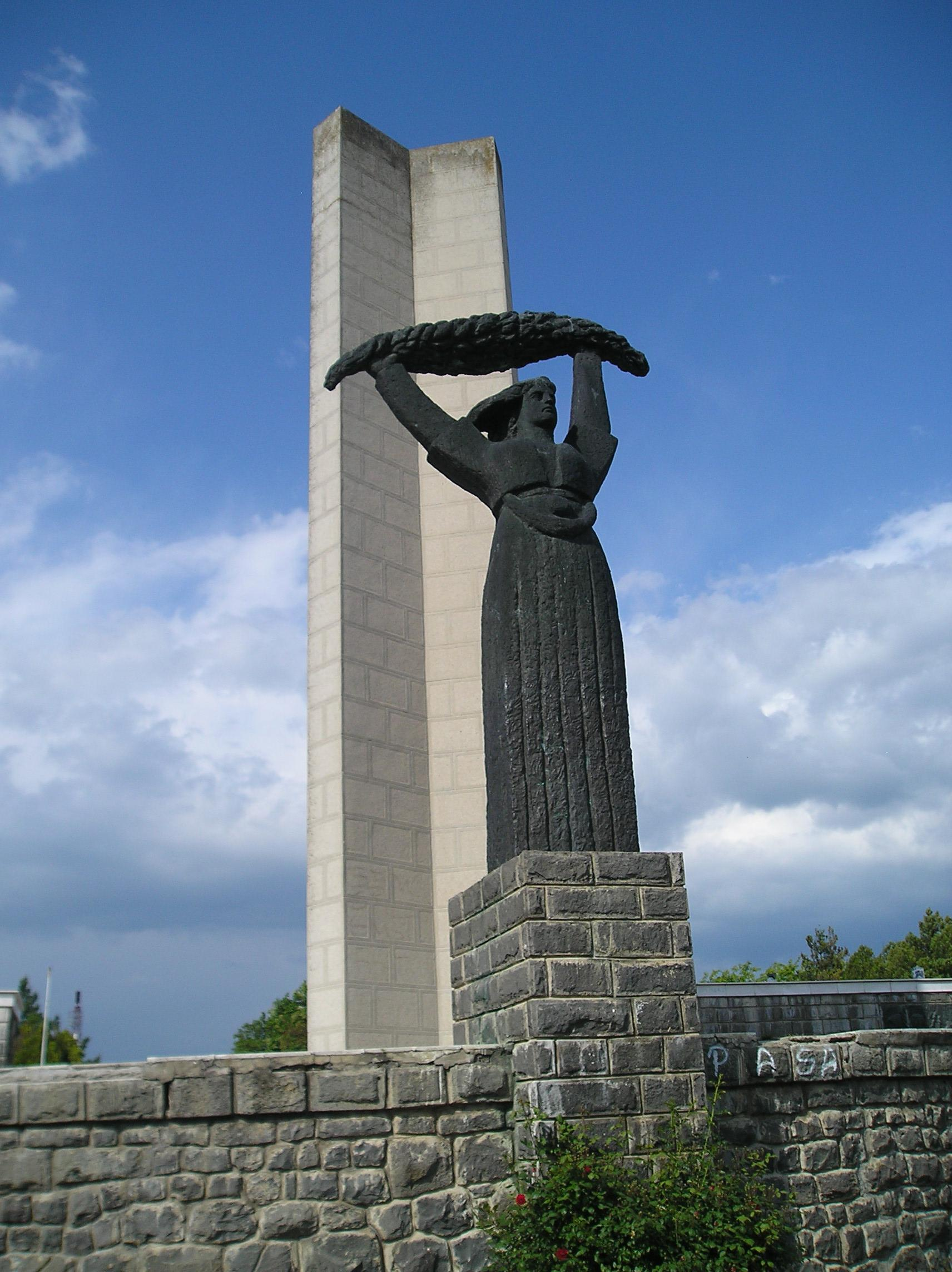
Memorial Ossuary

Polog and Kumanovo
- 1944 Zitomel company established
- 1945
  - Krsto Lazarov Konjushki executed
  - Teodosiy Dzhartov executed
  - Kumanovo Library established
  - Tane Georgievski Library established
  - Pobeda company established Later renamed CIK
- 1946
  - KIK company established
  - KK Kumanovo established
- 1947
  - Jug Turist company established
  - DIER company established later renamed "Dimche Erebica"
  - Iskara company established
  - FK Bashkimi established
- 1948
  - Theater Kumanovo established
  - NAMA (or Naroden Magazin) company established
  - Svetlina-Kumanovo company established
  - Prosveta company established
  - Population: 20,242
- 1951 Saltir Putinski elected mayor
- 1952 FZC 11 Oktomvri company established
- 1953
  - Kozjak company established
  - Population: 23,339
- 1954
  - Tekstilpromet company established
  - Bibrok company established
  - Kiro Fetak company established
  - Biserka company established
  - 11 Noemvri company established
- 1956 Lipkovo Dam completed
- 1957
  - Memorial Ossuary built
  - Josip Broz Tito visit
- 1958
  - Diocese of Polog and Kumanovo established
  - Kozhara-Kumanovo company established
  - 30 Juli company established
- 1959 Josip Broz Tito 2nd brief visit

Red flag represents the great achievement of communism in Kumanovo

- 1960
  - ZIK company established
  - Nace Bugjoni high school established
- 1961
  - Nash Vesnik newspaper established
  - Josip Broz Tito 3rd visit
  - Population: 30,762
- 1962 Monument to the Revolution built
- 1963 Jezdimir Bogdanski elected mayor
- 1964
  - Boro Petrushevski – Papuchar tobacco company established
  - Museum Kumanovo established
- 1965 Radio Kumanovo established
- 1967 Agro-Kumanovo company established
- 1970 Polet Company established
- 1971
  - Kiril Installed as Metropolitan bishop of DPK
  - Population: 46,363
- 1972
  - KIB company established
  - Josip Broz Tito 4th visit
- 1974
  - House Museum of Hristijan Todorovski Karpoš established
  - Metodi Petrovski elected mayor
- 1976 Pioners Home 29 Noemvri established
- 1980
  - Cultural Center Trajko Prokopiev established
  - Sports Hall Kumanovo built
- 1981 Population: 60,842
- 1982 Momchilo Jovanovski elected Mayor
- 1986 Momchilo Jovanovski loses Mayor position

== North Macedonia ==
- 1990
  - Blage Kiprijanovski elected Mayor
  - Kumani established
  - FK Milano established
- 1993 TV Hana established
- 1994
  - RK Kumanovo reached the 1/8 finals at the EHF Cup Winners' Cup
  - Population: 65,233
- 1996
  - Boris Protikj elected Mayor
  - Lipkovo, Staro Nagoričane, Orašac and Klečovce seceded from Kumanovo and became Municipalities
- 1997 Matejche Mosque built
- 1998
  - Days of Comedy theater festival established
- 1999 (NATO) (Serbia and Montenegro) Kumanovo Agreement signed

== 21st century ==
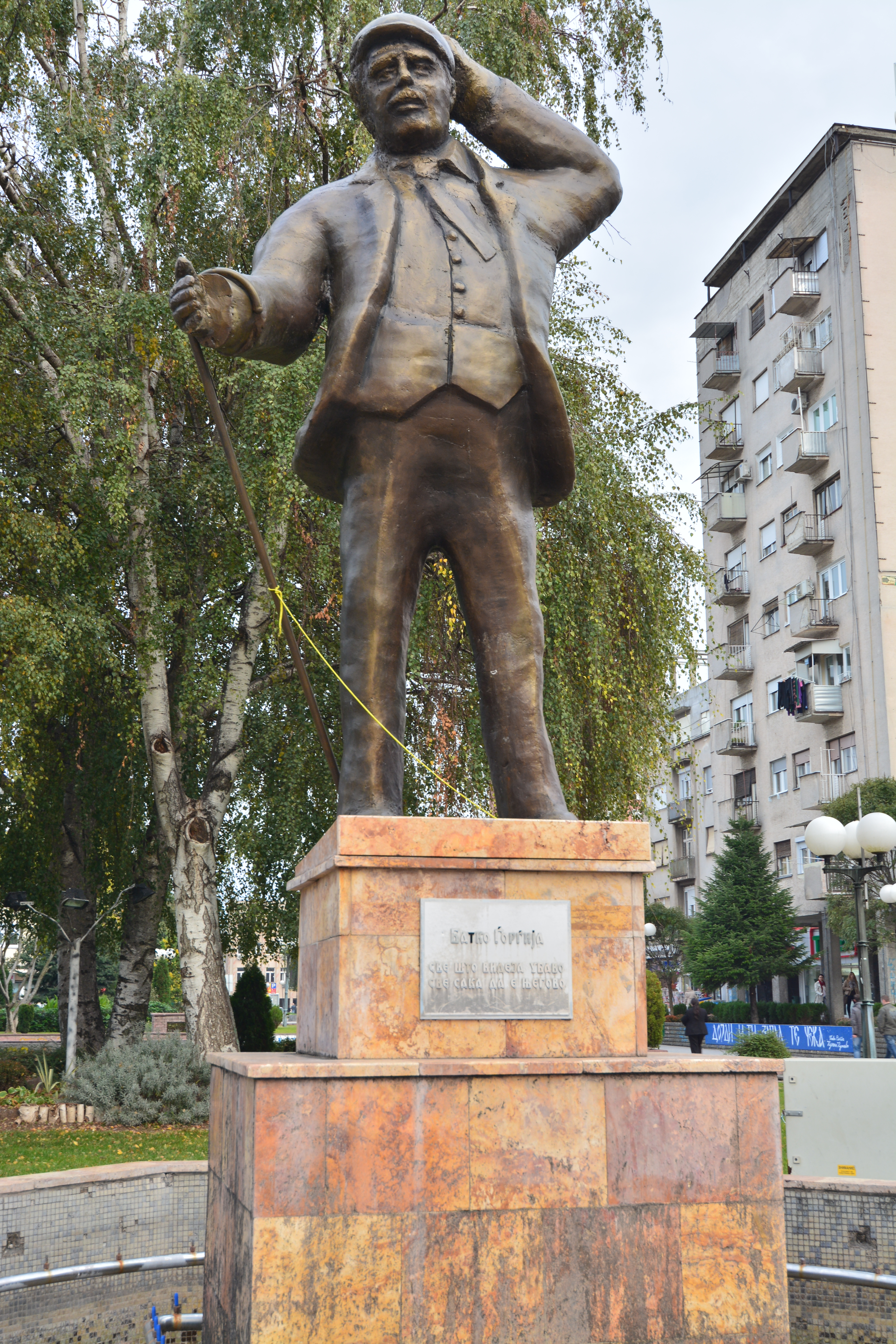
Batko Gjorgjija

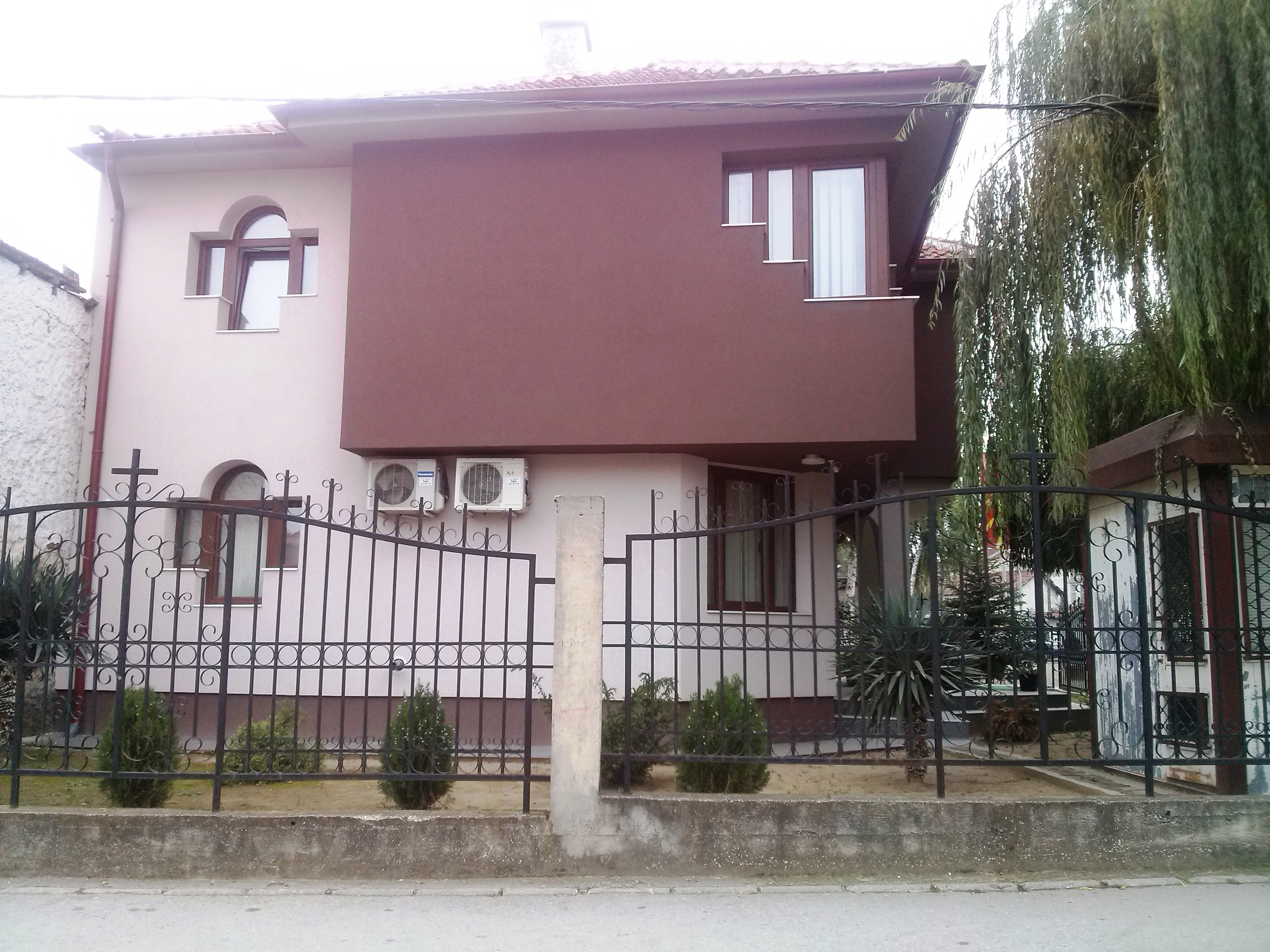
Kumanovo and Osogovo

Logo of Northeastern Region of Macedonia where Kumanovo is part of

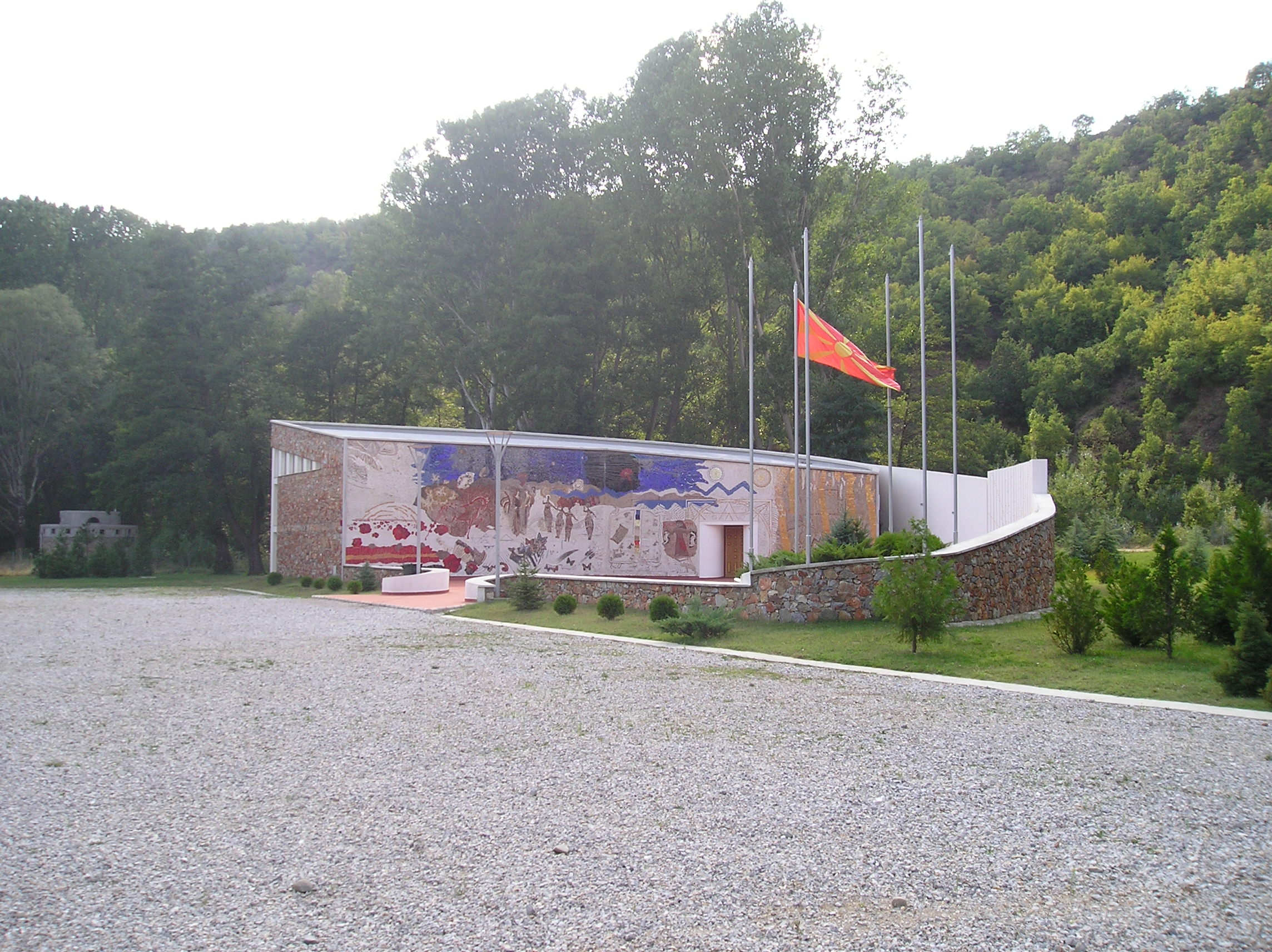
ASNOM memorial center, Pelince

=== 2000s ===
- 2000
  - Slobodan Kovachevski elected Mayor
  - St. George church built
- 2001
  - Kumanovo water crisis during the insurgency in Macedonia
  - Kokino discovered
  - Orthodox cemetery desecrated in v. Opae
- 2002
  - Gymnasium bombing
  - Radio Bravo established
  - KK Kumanovo reached the play-off final in the Macedonian First League
  - Football player Stefan Tolevski (age 23) dies while playing a game on Gradski Stadium Kumanovo
  - population: 70,842
- 2003
  - Euro College established
- 2004
  - Daniel Markovski participated and came as runner up at the MRT reality TV show "Toa Sum Jas"
  - (North Macedonia) ASNOM Memorial Center built
  - Municipality of Orashec merged with Kumanovo Municipality
  - Romeo Zhivikj Roki killed
- 2005
  - Zoran Damjanovski elected Mayor (first term)
  - Goran Georgievski Mujo killed
  - Sasho Dimitrievski killed
  - New Mosque built
  - FC Bashkimi made it to the Q2 of UEFA Cup first time for a team from Kumanovo
- 2006
  - Church of St. George built
  - Josip Broz Tito Monument built
- 2008
  - Consecration of the newly built Cross in Kosmatac
  - Bajrush Gang arrested
  - Northeastern Statistical Region established
- 2009
  - Zoran Damjanovski elected Mayor (second term)
  - Faculty of Business Administration established

=== 2010s ===
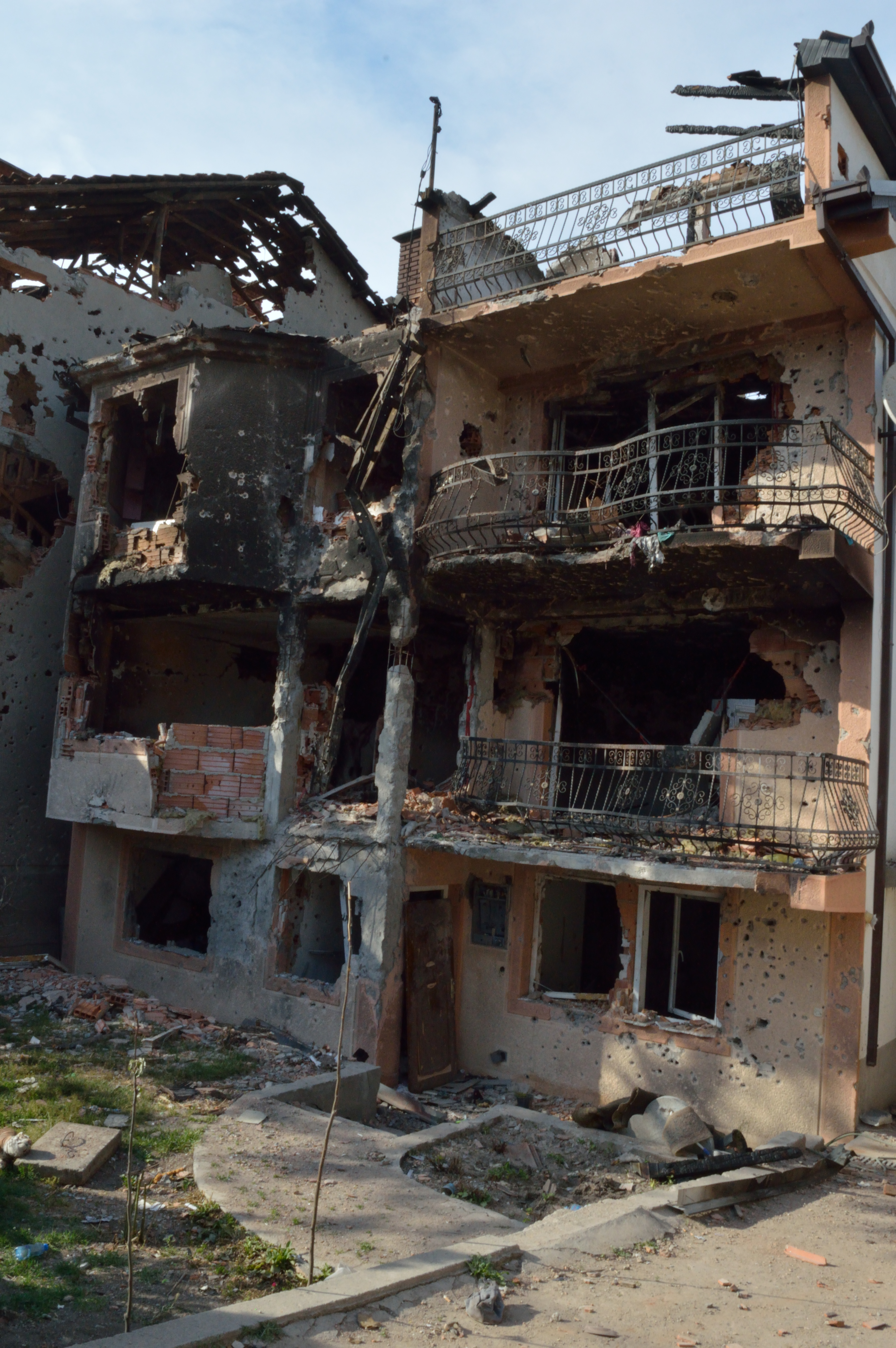
Clashes 2015
- 2010
  - Hadzi Shefket Mosque built
- 2011
  - Romanian Embassy in Macedonia established Aliriza Osmani as Honorary council of Romania in Kumanovo
- 2012
  - KK Kumanovo started to compete for the first time in the regional BIBL League
  - FK Goblen established
- 2013
  - Kiril of Polog and Kumanovo dies, Diocese of Polog and Kumanovo dissolved, Diocese of Kumanovo and Osogovo established, Joseph Installed as Metropolitan bishop of the DKO
  - Ploshtad newspaper established
  - Zoran Damjanovski elected Mayor (third term)
  - Kumanovo religious attacks
- 2014
  - Start of Rehabilitation of Section Kumanovo – Beljakovce, Railway Corridor VIII
  - Nezim Gang arrested
  - Church St. Archangel Michael built
  - Police station bombing
  - Listeriosis outbreak
- 2015
  - K3 TV established
  - TV Plus established
  - Church of Resurrection of Christ built
  - 9-10 May: Kumanovo clashes
  - KK Kumanovo started to compete for the first time in the newly formed FIBA Europe Cup
  - Consecration of the church of Holy Martyr Cyriaca in Zubovce
  - Orthodox Church Ascension of Christ built in Dolno Kojnare
  - Consecration of the church of St Nicholas the Wonderworker in Umin Dol
  - Kosturnik and Voinovikj villages established
  - Darko "Spejko" Petkovski won regional Big Brother
- 2016
  - (Bulgaria) Office of "Association of Macedonian-Bulgarian friendship" established
  - 8 Police officers posthumously awarded with Medal of Bravery
  - 10th annual "Gymnasiade 2016" was held in Kumanovo
  - (Greece) Olympiacos F.C. Fans attack on Lukoil Gas Station in Kumanovo
  - Consecration of Orthodox Church of Ascension of Christ built in the village of Pcinja
  - Consecration of Orthodox Church of Ascension of Christ in the village of Dolno Konjare
  - Consecration of Orthodox Church of the Most Holy Theotokos in Studena Bara
  - Public swimming pool Kumanovo established
  - Momchilo Jovanovski dies
- 2017
  - Christmas procession for the first time in Kumanovo

== See also ==
List of mayors of Kumanovo
List of Metropolitans of Diocese of Kumanovo and Osogovo
Timeline of Skopje
