= List of mayors of Kumanovo =

This is a list of mayors of Kumanovo, North Macedonia.

== List of mayors ==
#	Name (Born–Died)	Portrait	Elected	Term of office		Political affiliation
Ottoman Empire (Kumanovo Kaza 1867-1912 Kaymakam); Kingdom of Yugoslavia (1918 onward)
1	Kjira Andjelkovic		1918	1918	1920	
2	Kosta Daljev		1920	1920	1921	Komunist Party
3	Toma Gligorijevic first term		1922	1922	1924	
4	Gjorgje Mladenovikj		1924	1924	1926	
5	Toma Gligorijevic second term		1926	1926	1929	
6	Kjira Manevich first term		1929	1929	1935	
7	Toma Gligorijevic third term		1935	1935	1936	
8	Kjira Manevich second term		1936	1936	1936	
9	Nikola Stojanovski		1936	1936	1937	
10	Dragomir Vukadinovikj		1937	1937	1938	
11	Trajko Loparski		1939	1939	1940	Jugoslovenska Radikalna Zaednica
12	Kjira Manevich third term		1940	1940	1941	
Bulgaria (1941–1945)
1	Teodosiy Dzhartov		1941	1941	1941	Bulgarian Action Committees
1	Milan Gotsev		1941	1944	1944	Bulgarian Action Committees
2	Josif Andonov		1944	1944	1944	Bulgarian Action Committees
Socialist Federative Republic of Yugoslavia (1945–1990)
1	Nikola Peshev		1945	1945	?	Communist Party of Yugoslavia
2	Saltir Putinski		1951	1951	1961	Communist Party of Yugoslavia
3	Jezdimir Bogdanski (1930–2007)		1963	1963	1969	Communist Party of Yugoslavia
4	Blashko Janevski (1930–2007)		1972	1972	1972	Communist Party of Yugoslavia
5	Metodi Petrovski		1974	1974	1978	Communist Party of Yugoslavia
6	Metodi Petrovski		1978	1978	1982	Communist Party of Yugoslavia
7	Momchilo Jovanovski (August 1, 1931 – 2016)		1982	1982	1986	Communist Party of Yugoslavia
8	Tode Ilich (1943–2014)		1984	1984	1986	Communist Party of Yugoslavia
R Macedonia (1991 onward)
1	(North Macedonia) Blage Kiprijanovski (1948-)		1991	1991	1996	Social Democratic Union of Macedonia
2	(North Macedonia) Boris Protikj (1941–2006)		1996	1996	2000	Social Democratic Union of Macedonia
3	(North Macedonia) Slobodan Kovachevski		2000	2000	2005	Social Democratic Union of Macedonia
4	(North Macedonia) Zoran Damjanovski (1956-)		2005	2005	2009	Social Democratic Union of Macedonia
5	(North Macedonia) Zoran Damjanovski second term (1956-)		2009	2009	2013	Social Democratic Union of Macedonia
6	(North Macedonia) Zoran Damjanovski third term (1956-)		2013	2013	2017	Social Democratic Union of Macedonia
7	(North Macedonia) Maksim Dimitrievski (1975-)		2017	2017	2021	Social Democratic Union of Macedonia
8	(North Macedonia) Maksim Dimitrievski (1975-)		2021	2021	incumbent	For Our Macedonia

== See also ==
- Mayor of Kumanovo
- Kumanovo
- Municipality of Kumanovo
