= Kumanovo Town Cemetery =

Cemetery in North Macedonia

Kumanovo Town Cemetery Градски гробишта Куманово
- Interactive map of Kumanovo Town Cemetery; Градски гробишта Куманово

Details
- Location: Kumanovo
- Country: North Macedonia
- Coordinates: 42.123°N 21.725°E
- Type: Public
- Owned by: Kumanovo Municipality
- Website: Official Site

Kumanovo Town Cemetery is located in the southeast part of Kumanovo, North Macedonia.

== Buildings ==
- Church of Resurrection of Christ

== Other ==
In 2006 there was vandalism of the grave of the brother of the current mayor of Kumanovo.

== Notable interments ==
- Vladimir Antonov architect
- Dragan Bogdanovski Political dissident
- Dejan Jakimovski Soldier
- Marjan Trajkovikj Military pilot
- Tode Ilich former mayor of Kumanovo
- Jezdimir Bogdanski former mayor of Kumanovo
- Boris Protikj former mayor of Kumanovo
- Boris Chushkarov first director of OZNA for SR Macedonia
- Momchilo Jovanovski former mayor of Kumanovo
