= List of presidents of Council of Kumanovo Municipality =

This is a list of presidents of the Council of Kumanovo Municipality.

== Presidents ==
| # | Name | Portrait | Appointed | Ended | Political party | Mayor | Northeastern | (North Macedonia) President |
|---|---|---|---|---|---|---|---|---|
| 5 | Ivana Gjorgjievska | | 2022 | present | ZNK | Maksim Dimitrievski | Mladen Protić | Stevo Pendarovski |
| 4 | Atina Mugreshanska | | 2017 | 2022 | SDSM | Maksim Dimitrievski | Mladen Protic | Gjorge Ivanov |
| 3 | Aleksandar Arsikj | | 2016 | 2017 | SDSM | Zoran Damjanovski | Mladen Protic | Gjorge Ivanov |
| 2 | Maksim Dimitrievski | | 2012 | 2016 | SDSM | Zoran Damjanovski | Mladen Protic | Gjorge Ivanov |
| 1 | Viktor Cvetkovski | | 2011 | 2012 | SDSM | Zoran Damjanovski | Mladen Protic | Gjorge Ivanov |

- This list is not complete

== See also ==
- Mayor of Kumanovo
- List of mayors of Kumanovo
