= Blage Kiprijanovski =

Mayor of the Kumanovo Municipality in Macedonia

Blage Kiprijanovski Благе Кипријановски

1st Mayor of Kumanovo
- In office 1993–1996
- Prime Minister: Branko Crvenkovski
- Preceded by: New Office
- Succeeded by: Boris Protikj

Personal details
- Born: Blage Kiprijanovski; 22 February 1948 (age 78) Kumanovo, SR Macedonia
- Party: LP
- Occupation: Politician
- Ethnicity: Macedonian

Military service
- Allegiance: (Socialist Federal Republic of Yugoslavia) SFRY
- Branch/service: Yugoslav People's Army
- Rank: Private

Blage Kiprijanovski was a Mayor of Kumanovo Municipality in Macedonia.

== See also ==
- Mayor of Kumanovo
- List of mayors of Kumanovo
- Kumanovo Municipality
- Kumanovo shootings
- Timeline of Kumanovo

Political offices
Preceded by Tode Ilich; President of the Assembly of Municipality of Kumanovo	Mayor of Kumanovo; 1993-1996	Succeeded by Boris Protikj
