= Nikola Peshev =

- Никола Пешев

Mayor of Kumanovo
- In office July 30, 1944 – ?
- Deputy: Dragi Mladenovikj "Pirokjanac"
- Preceded by: Josif Andonov (BAC)
- Succeeded by: Unknown

Personal details
- Born: Kumanovo, Ottoman Empire
- Died: Kumanovo, SFRY
- Citizenship: SFRY
- Party: LCY

Nikola Peshev was the first Mayor of Kumanovo, Socialist Republic of Macedonia.

== See also ==
List of mayors of Kumanovo

Government offices
Preceded by Josif Andonov; Bulgarian Action Committees	Mayor of Kumanovo; 1994-????	Succeeded by ?
