= Zoran Damjanovski =

Zoran Damjanovski Зоран Дамјановски
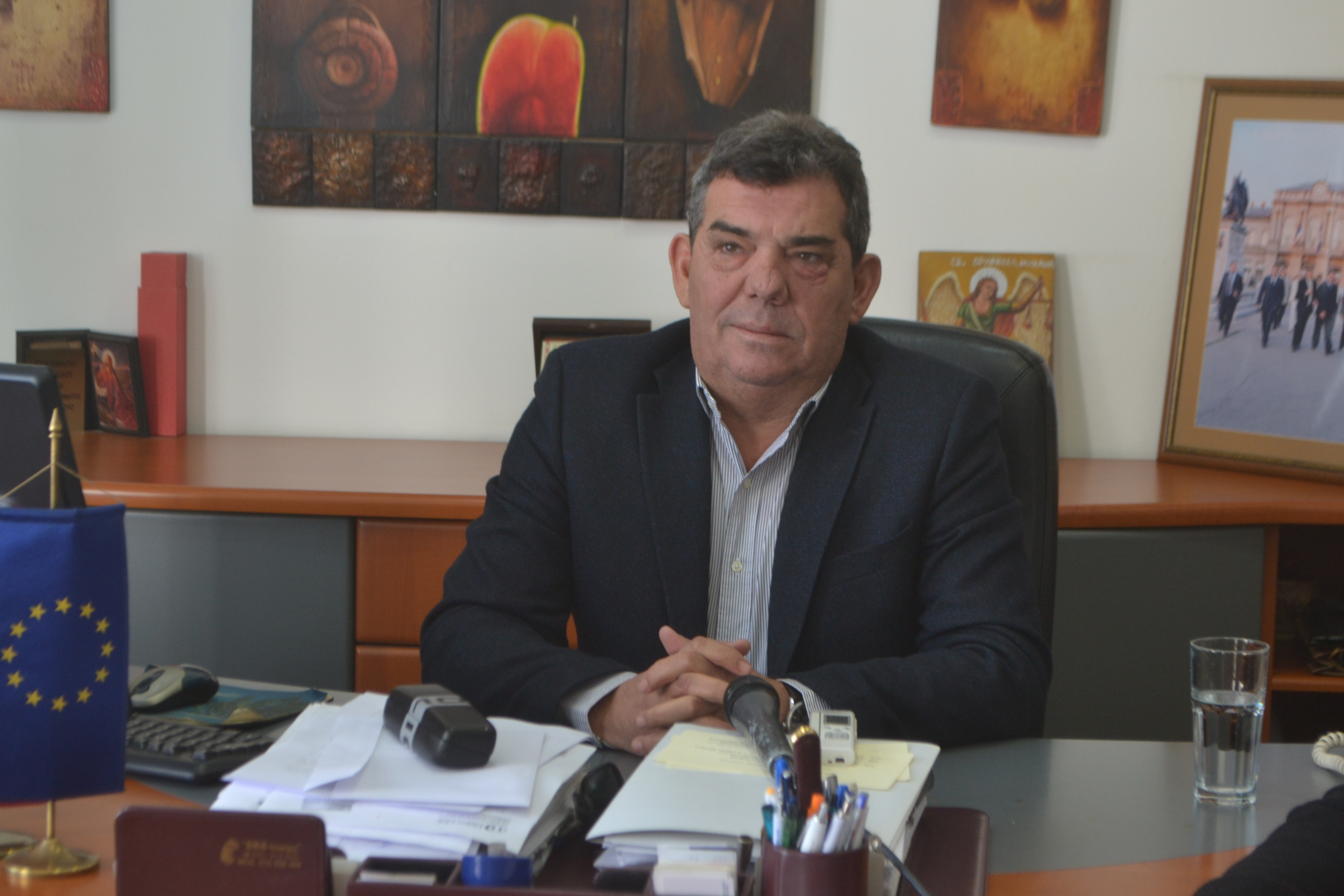
- Zoran Damjanovski in 2017

4th 5th 6th Mayor of Kumanovo
- In office 2005 – October 2017
- Prime Minister: Vlado Bučkovski (2005-2006); Nikola Gruevski (2006-2016); Emil Dimitriev (2016-2017) Zoran Zaev (2017-present)
- Deputy: Viktor Cvetkovski (2011-2012); Maksim Dimitrievski (2012-2016); Aleksandar Arsikj (2017-present)
- Preceded by: Slobodan Kovachevski

Personal details
- Born: Зоран Дамјановски; 5 July 1956 (age 70) Kumanovo; SFRY (today: Macedonia)
- Party: SDUM
- Children: 3
- Education: Ss. Cyril and Methodius University in Skopje; University of Ljubljana
- Occupation: Doctor, Politician
- Nickname: Cic
- Ethnicity: Macedonian

Military service
- Allegiance: (Socialist Federal Republic of Yugoslavia) SFRY
- Branch/service: Yugoslav People's Army
- Rank: Private

Zoran Damjanovski is a Mayor of Kumanovo Municipality in Macedonia serving his third term.

== See also ==
- Mayor of Kumanovo
- List of mayors of Kumanovo
- Kumanovo Municipality
- Kumanovo shootings
- Timeline of Kumanovo

Government offices
Preceded by Slobodan Kovachevski himself himself	Mayor of Kumanovo; 2005–2009 (first term); 2009-2013 (second term); 2013-2017 (third term)	Succeeded by himself himself incumbent
