= Boris Protić =

Mayor of Kumanovo Municipality in Macedonia

Boris Protić Борис Протиќ

2nd Mayor of Kumanovo
- In office 1996–2000
- Prime Minister: Branko Crvenkovski, Ljubčo Georgievski
- Preceded by: Blage Kiprijanovski
- Succeeded by: Slobodan Kovačevski

Personal details
- Born: Boris Protik; May 18th, 1941 Kumanovo, Kingdom of Bulgaria
- Died: June 15, 2002 (61) Pčinja, Kumanovo, Republic of Macedonia
- Party: SDUM
- Occupation: Politician
- Ethnicity: Macedonian

Boris Protić was a Mayor of Kumanovo Municipality in Macedonia.

== See also ==
- Mayor of Kumanovo
- List of mayors of Kumanovo
- Kumanovo Municipality
- Kumanovo shootings
- Timeline of Kumanovo

Government offices
Preceded by Blage Kiprijanovski	Mayor of Kumanovo; 1996-2000	Succeeded by Slobodan Kovachevski
