= Tode Ilich =

Tode Ilich Тоде Илиќ

Mayor of Kumanovo
- In office April 12, 1984 – April 14, 1986

Personal details
- Born: April 7, 1943 Nikuljane, Kumanovo, SR Macedonia
- Died: January 14, 2014 (aged 70) Kumanovo
- Resting place: Kumanovo Town Cemetery
- Party: Communist Party of Yugoslavia
- Occupation: Politician
- Ethnicity: Serb from Macedonia

Military service
- Allegiance: (Socialist Federal Republic of Yugoslavia) SFRY
- Branch/service: Yugoslav People's Army
- Rank: Private

Tode Ilich was a mayor of Kumanovo Municipality, Macedonia. Prior to his public office function he was also director of the Zitomel company in his native town.

== See also ==
- Kumanovo Municipality

Political offices
Preceded by	Mayor of Kumanovo; 1984-1986	Succeeded by Blage Kiprijanovski
