= For Our Macedonia =

For Our Macedonia За наша Македонија
- Abbreviation: ZNAM
- Leader: Maksim Dimitrievski
- Founder: Maksim Dimitrievski
- Founded: 9 October 2023
- Registered: 23 December 2023
- Split from: Social Democratic Union of Macedonia
- Headquarters: Skopje, Bulevar Sveti Kliment Ohridski 66
- Ideology: Social democracy Left-wing populism
- Colours: Blue; Red; Yellow
- Assembly: 6 / 120
- Mayors: 1 / 81
- Local councils (Note: Also with coalitions.): 44 / 1,345
- Skopje city council: 1 / 45

Website
- dvizenjeznam.org.mk

For Our Macedonia (abbr. ZNAM, lit. 'I Know'; Macedonian: За Наша Македонија, romanized: Za naša Makedonija;) is a political party in North Macedonia founded by former SDSM member and current Mayor of Kumanovo, Maksim Dimitrievski.

== History ==
On 9 October 2023, the founding congress of the ZNAM party was held. At the congress, representatives of 10 civic associations signed the initiative to form a party. Maksim Dimitrievski was elected president, and Katerina Todoroska and Emil Janeski were appointed as part of the working Presidency.

On 23 December 2023, the registration of the ZNAM party was completed.

The movement has announced its intention to participate in the 2024 presidential and parliamentary elections.

== Ideology ==
Maksim Dimitrievski describes his views as socially and economically left-wing, but his national views as moving towards centre and sometimes right-wing.

Dimitrievski said that the main goal of his party would be to unite citizens and return the country to the right path, "to the foundations of our statehood". The party's goal, he said, is not to be in opposition, but to win power, and the first step from this position will be the abolition of the Criminal Code, adopted under the "European flag".

Dimitrievski said his movement could attract both SDSM and VMRO-DPMNE supporters, "but most of them will be undecided citizens who have not been involved in politics and have results to show for their work".

== Election results ==
=== Presidential elections ===
Election	Party candidate	First round		Second round		Result
Election	Party candidate	Votes	%	Votes	%	Result
2024	Maksim Dimitrievski	83,855	9.52%	—N/a	—N/a	Lost ✗

=== Assembly elections ===
Election	Party candidate	Votes	%	Seats	±	Result	Government
2024	Maksim Dimitrievski	56,232	5.74%	6 / 120	New	▲6th	Government
