= Kumanovo Fortress =

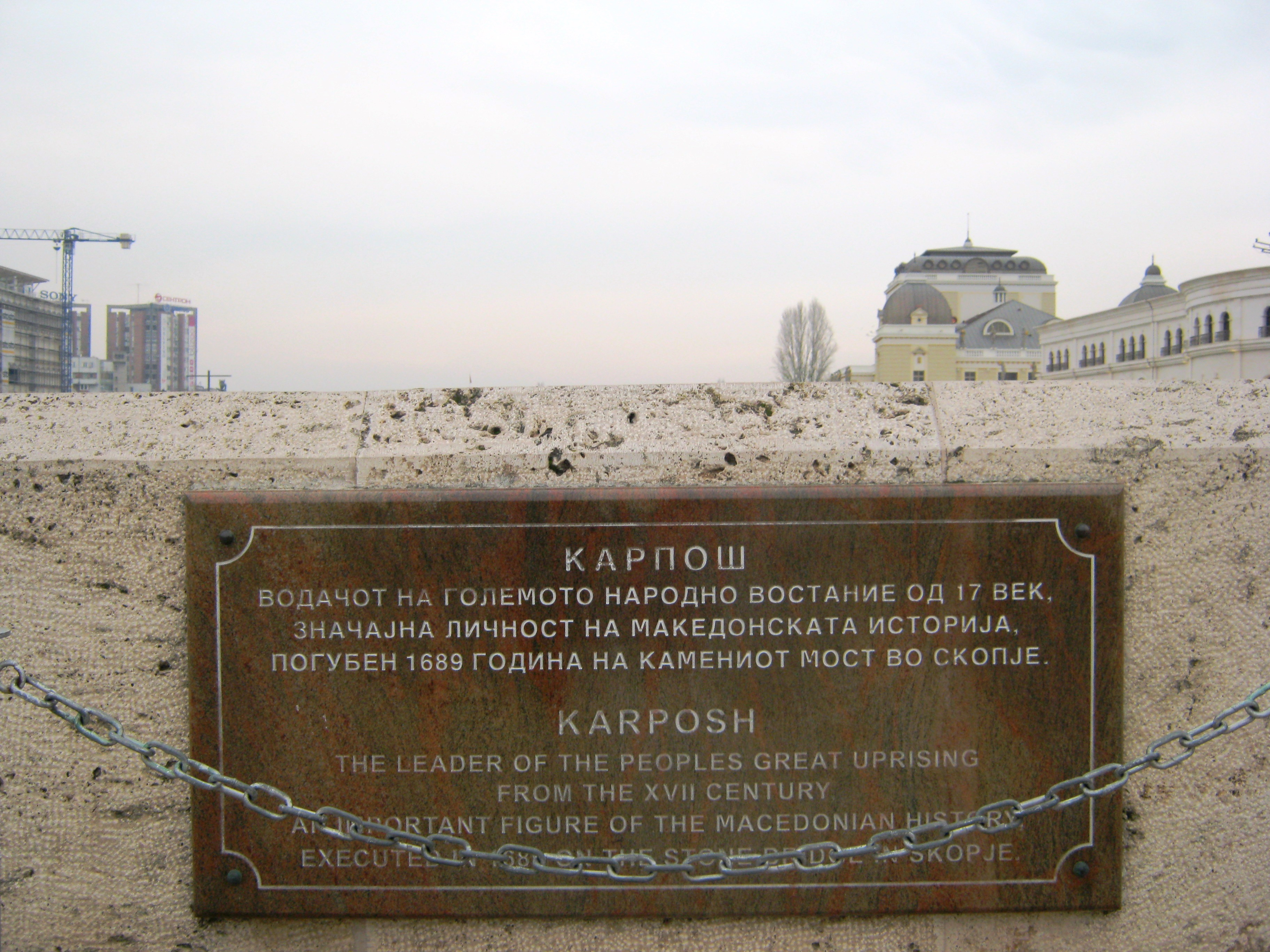
Place were the Rebel leader was executed

Kumanovo Fortress was a palisade or fortress built in the late 17th Century, in order to halt the strong Ottoman forces during the great uprisings of 1689 situated in Ottoman Macedonia. On November 26, 1689 Arambasha Karposh and his rebel forces mounted a defence of Kumanovo Fortress against Selim Giray, but were unsuccessful.

== See also ==
- Karposh's Rebellion
