= Slobodan Kovačevski =

Macedonian politician

1st Republic of Macedonia Ambassador to Montenegro
- In office 2006–2010
- Prime Minister: Nikola Gruevski
- Preceded by: New Office
- Succeeded by: Aleksandar Vasilevski

3rd Mayor of Kumanovo
- In office 2000–2005
- Prime Minister: Ljubčo Georgievski, Vlado Bučkovski
- Preceded by: Boris Protikj
- Succeeded by: Zoran Damjanovski

Personal details
- Born: Kumanovo, SR Macedonia, SFR Yugoslavia
- Party: SDUM
- Occupation: Politician

Slobodan Kovačevski (Macedonian: Слободан Ковачевски) was The Mayor of Kumanovo Municipality in Macedonia from 2000 to 2005. He was Macedonian Ambassador in Montenegro from 2006 to 2010.

Diplomatic posts
| New title | Macedonia Ambassador to Montenegro; 2006–2010 | Succeeded by Aleksandar Vasilevski |
Government offices
| Preceded by Boris Protikj | Mayor of Kumanovo; 2000–2005 | Succeeded by Zoran Damjanovski |
