= Public swimming pool Kumanovo =

Swimming venue in Kumanovo, North Macedonia

- Full name: Sports and re-creative center City Swimming Pool - Kumanovo
- Location: Kumanovo, North Macedonia
- Owner: Kumanovo Municipality
- Operator: Kumanovo Municipality
- Capacity: 500

Construction
- Built: 2011 - 2016
- Opened: 2 August 2016
- Cost: 200m MKD; ~ 3.3m €

Public swimming pool Kumanovo is a sport venue in Kumanovo, North Macedonia, that contains an Olympic-size indoor swimming pool and an outdoor swimming pool open for the general public. The venue was financed by the Kumanovo Municipality and it was completed and opened for public on August 2, 2016.
