= Maksim Dimitrievski =

Mayor of Kumanovo, North Macedonia

- Максим Димитриевски
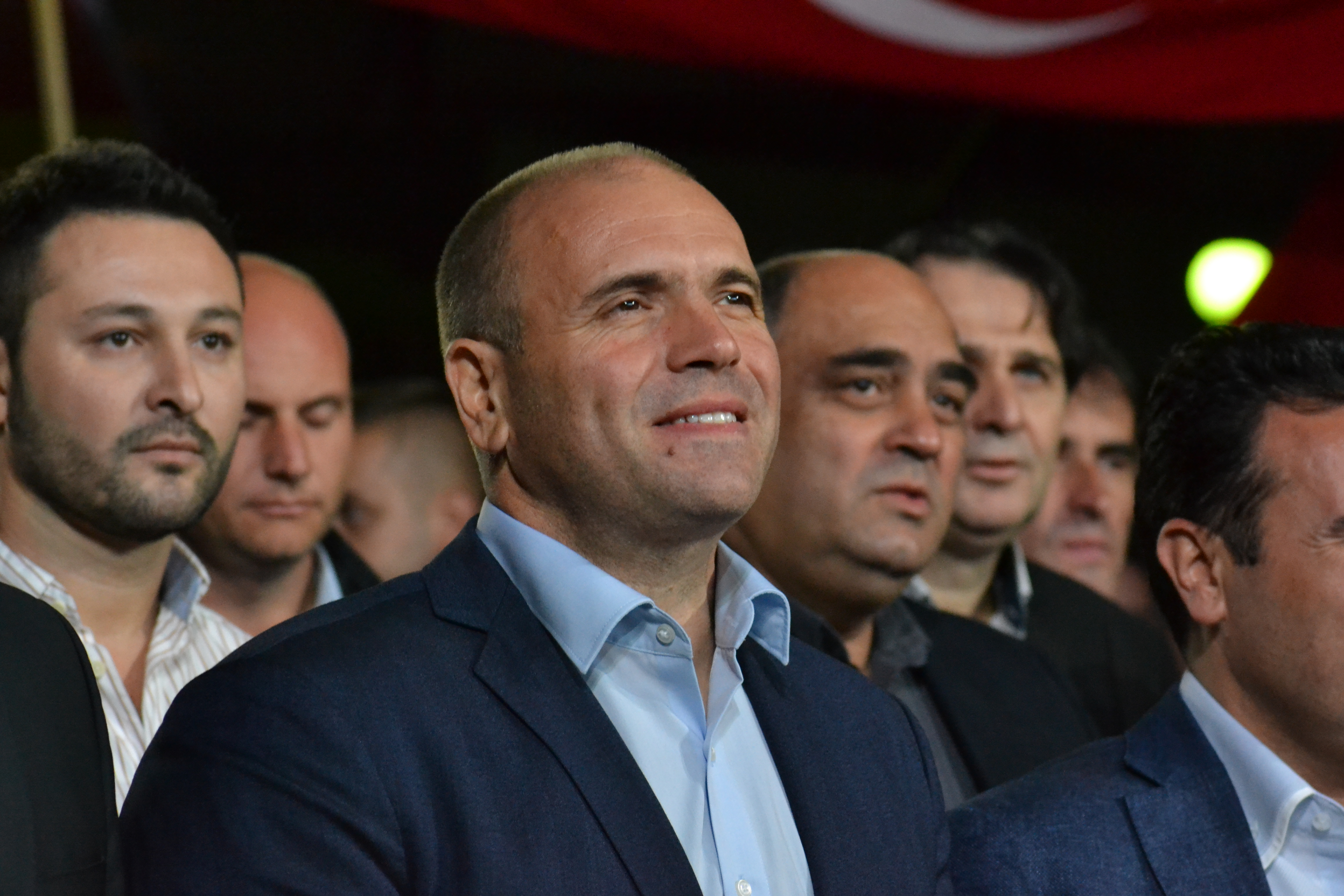
- Dimitrievski in 2017

Mayor of Kumanovo Municipality
- Incumbent
- Assumed office 15 October 2017
- Preceded by: Zoran Damjanovski

Member of the City Council of Kumanovo
- In office April 2009 – October 2012

President of the Council of Kumanovo Municipality
- In office October 2012 – December 2016
- Preceded by: Viktor Cvetkovski
- Succeeded by: Aleksandar Arsikj

Member of the Assembly of the Republic of Macedonia
- In office 28 December 2016 – 1 November 2017

Personal details
- Born: Максим Димитриевски; 29 November 1975 (age 50) Kumanovo, SR Macedonia; SFR Yugoslavia
- Party: For Our Macedonia (2023–present)
- Other political affiliations: Social Democratic Union (2008–2021)
- Spouse: Nadica Dimitrievska
- Children: 3
- Education: Ss. Cyril and Methodius University in Skopje

Maksim Dimitrievski - Makso (Macedonian: Максим Димитриевски-Максо; born 29 November 1975) is the incumbent mayor of Kumanovo Municipality. Previously he was a member of the City Council, President of the Council of Kumanovo Municipality, and a former member of the Assembly of the Republic of Macedonia.

== Early life and career ==
Maksim Dimitrievski was born on 29 November 1975 in Kumanovo. He finished his primary and secondary education in his hometown and graduated from the Faculty of Law of Ss. Cyril and Methodius University of Skopje.

In 2009, he was a member of the executive committee of the Social Democratic Union of Macedonia, where he began his political career as a young activist.

In 2021, he was re-elected as Mayor of Kumanovo as an independent candidate.

In 2025 local elections, he was re-elected for second time as Mayor of Kumanovo as an candidate for ZNAM.

Dimitrievski has developed business in Bulgaria as a participant in a commercial company.
