= Jezdimir Bogdanski =

Macedonian political commissar and politician (1930–2007)

- Јездимир Богдански
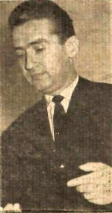

President of the Presidency of SR Macedonia
- In office May 1988 – 28 April 1990
- Preceded by: Dragoljub Stavrev
- Succeeded by: Vladimir Mitkov

Mayor of Kumanovo
- In office 1963–1969
- Preceded by: Saltir Putinski
- Succeeded by: Metodi Petrovski

Personal details
- Born: 17 November 1930 Kumanovo, Kingdom of Yugoslavia
- Died: 25 October 2007 (aged 76) Skopje, Macedonia
- Party: Communist Party of Macedonia
- Education: University of Zagreb
- Awards

Jezdimir Bogdanski (17 November 1930, Kumanovo – 30 October 2007) was a Macedonian politician and a participant in the National Liberation War.

== See also ==
Kumanovo

== Honours ==
- YUG Commemorative Medal of the Partisans - 1941

Political offices
Preceded by ?	Mayor of Kumanovo; 1963–1969	Succeeded by ?
