= Mayor of Kumanovo =

- Градоначалник на Куманово; Kryetari i Komunës së Kumanovës
- Incumbent; Maksim Dimitrievski since 2017
- Residence: Opshtina Kumanovo
- Term length: Four years
- Formation: 1991 (Republic of Macedonia); 1941 (PR Macedonia); 1918 (Vardarska Banovina)
- Website: Official website

The Mayor of Kumanovo is the Mayor of the Kumanovo Municipality, Macedonia.

== Council ==
The current council was elected in 2013. It has 33 members.

- 12 council members are from SDSM (to include the President of the Council)
- 12 council members are from VMRO DPMNE
- 4 council members are from DUI
- 2 council members are from DPA
- 1 council member is from NDR
- 2 council members are independently elected

== See also ==
- President of the Council of Kumanovo Municipality
- List of presidents of Council of Kumanovo Municipality
