= List of companies in Kumanovo =

This is an incomplete list of major companies or subsidiaries headquartered in Kumanovo, North Macedonia.

== Defunct companies ==
- Biserka
- Jug Turist
- Iskra
- NRIO Nash Vesnik
- Ploshtad
- TV Nova

== See also ==
- Kumanovo
