= Nash Vesnik =

Newspaper

Nash Vesnik Наш Весник
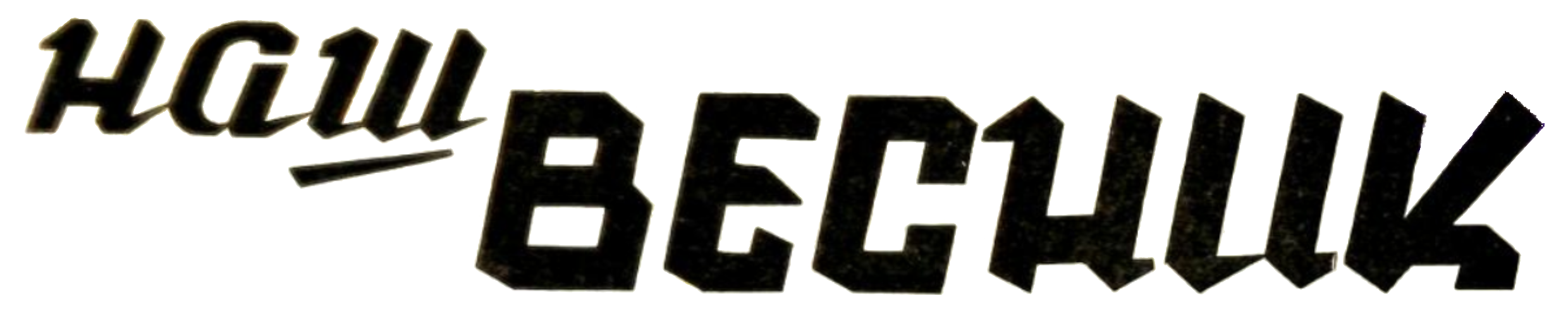

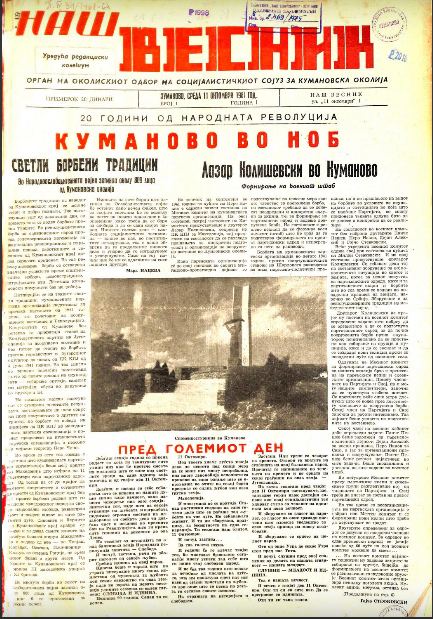
- Nash Vesnik first edition
- Type: Monthly (1961-1962); Twice a month (1962-1970); Weekly (every Friday) (1970-2001)
- Owner: Assembly of Kumanovo Municipality (1989-2001)
- Publisher: NRIO "Nash Vesnik"
- Editor: Ivanka Mugrashanska (1961-1964); Metodi Petrovski (1965-1969); Trajko Pachkov (1969-1979); Boris Burnazovski (1979-1982); Nada Ivanovska (1982-1989); Vojche Krstevski (1989-2001)
- Launched: November 11, 1961
- Ceased publication: 2001
- Language: Macedonian
- Headquarters: 11 Oktomvri bb
- City: Kumanovo
- Country: Macedonia (present-day North Macedonia)
- Circulation: 1500 (as of 1961)
- Sister newspapers: None
- Website: None
- Free online archives: Наш Весник

Nash Vesnik (Macedonian: Наш Весник, lit. 'Our Newspaper') was a local regional newspaper in the Socialist Federal Republic of Yugoslavia and later the Republic of Macedonia, now known as North Macedonia. First it was a monthly newspaper. Because of a great interest, it started to be published twice a month. Since April 1970, it was published weekly every Friday and since 1971, it became an official newspaper of the local government in Kumanovo. In 1989, the responsibility of the newspaper went to the Assembly of Macedonia.

The newspaper was financially supported by the government. In 2018, the Director of the local Library in Kumanovo has announced that the newspaper will be digitized and available for reading in the library.

== See also ==
- TV Kumanovo
