= Jug Turist =

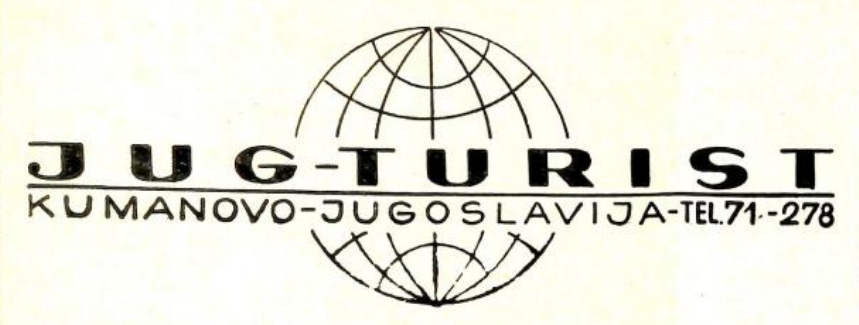
- Native name: Југ Турист
- Industry: Transport
- Founded: 1947
- Defunct: 2013
- Headquarters: Kumanovo, Macedonia

Jug Turist (Macedonian Cyrillic: Југ Турист) was a transport company in Kumanovo, Macedonia established in 1947. The company was taken over in 2013 by Rule Turs from Skopje.

== History ==
In the period from 2004 till 2009 the Directors of the company has damaged the company with bad business decisions for 500,000 euros. in 2013 one of the drivers was attacked in Štip.

== See also ==
- List of companies in Kumanovo
- Transport in the Republic of Macedonia
