= Kumanovo Prison =

Prison in North Macedonia

Kumanovo Prison Казнено-поправна установа Куманово
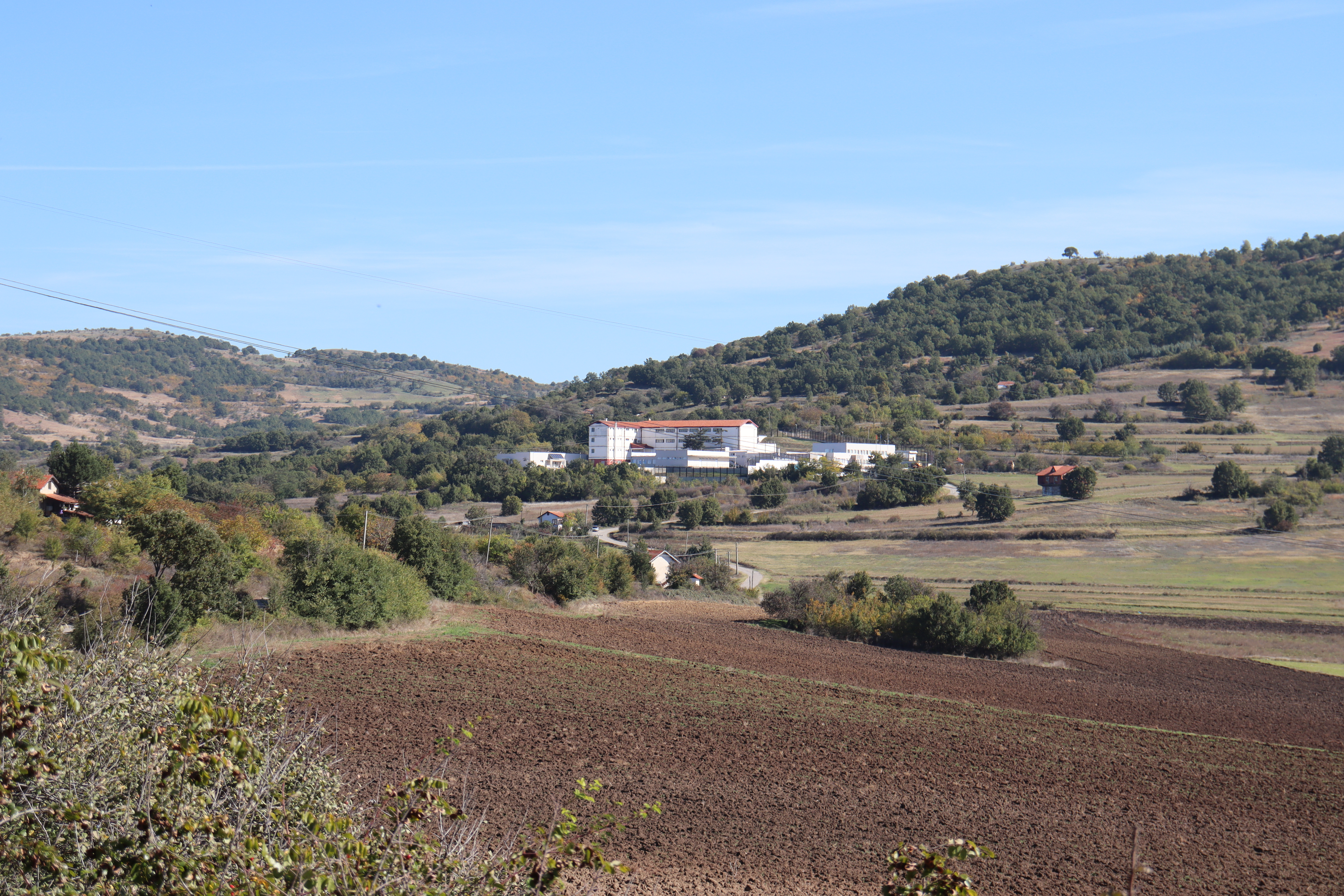
- Interactive map of Kumanovo Prison Казнено-поправна установа Куманово
- Location: K'shenje, near Kumanovo
- Status: Operational
- Security class: semi-open
- Population: 250
- Opened: 2013
- Managed by: Ministry of Justice of North Macedonia

Kumanovo Prison (Macedonian: Казнено-поправна установа Куманово) is a Macedonian prison in the village of K'shenje near Kumanovo, North Macedonia. It opened in 2013.

The facility was constructed in two stages. The first, in 2008 and 2009, involved the completion of the prison building, sub-station and treatment plant, at an estimated cost of 72 million MKD. The second phase began in 2011 and included construction of additional rooms and facilities, among them an administration facility, prisoner workshop, religious room and sporting fields. The total cost was 234 million MKD. The project was funded with a loan from the Development Bank of the Council of Europe and the budget of North Macedonia.

== Prison complex ==
The entire prison complex is enclosed by a four-meter-high fence. The 5,000-square-meter institution has separate heating and water supply systems, and solar collectors for the heating of water for the kitchen and bathrooms of prisoners.

== Security ==
The institution implemented surveillance technology to minimize the need for prison security staff.

== Sanitation criticisms ==
In late 2014, the prison was accused of poisoning the nearby environment due to its lack of sanitation infrastructure. Allegations made by the Helsinki Committee for Human Rights in North Macedonia cited expert findings from the Institute of Public Health that water from both within the prison and surrounding areas was not safe for drinking due to the presence of E.coli bacteria. In a statement from the executive director of the Helsinki Committee, the following was said: "The water had a strange color and small pieces of unknown material. The Committee sent the water for laboratory examination and the obtained results showed that water was not safe for drinking."

== See also ==
- Buildings in Kumanovo
- Kumanovo
