= Kokino =

Bronze Age archaeological site in the Republic of North Macedonia

Coordinates: 42.263°N 21.954°E

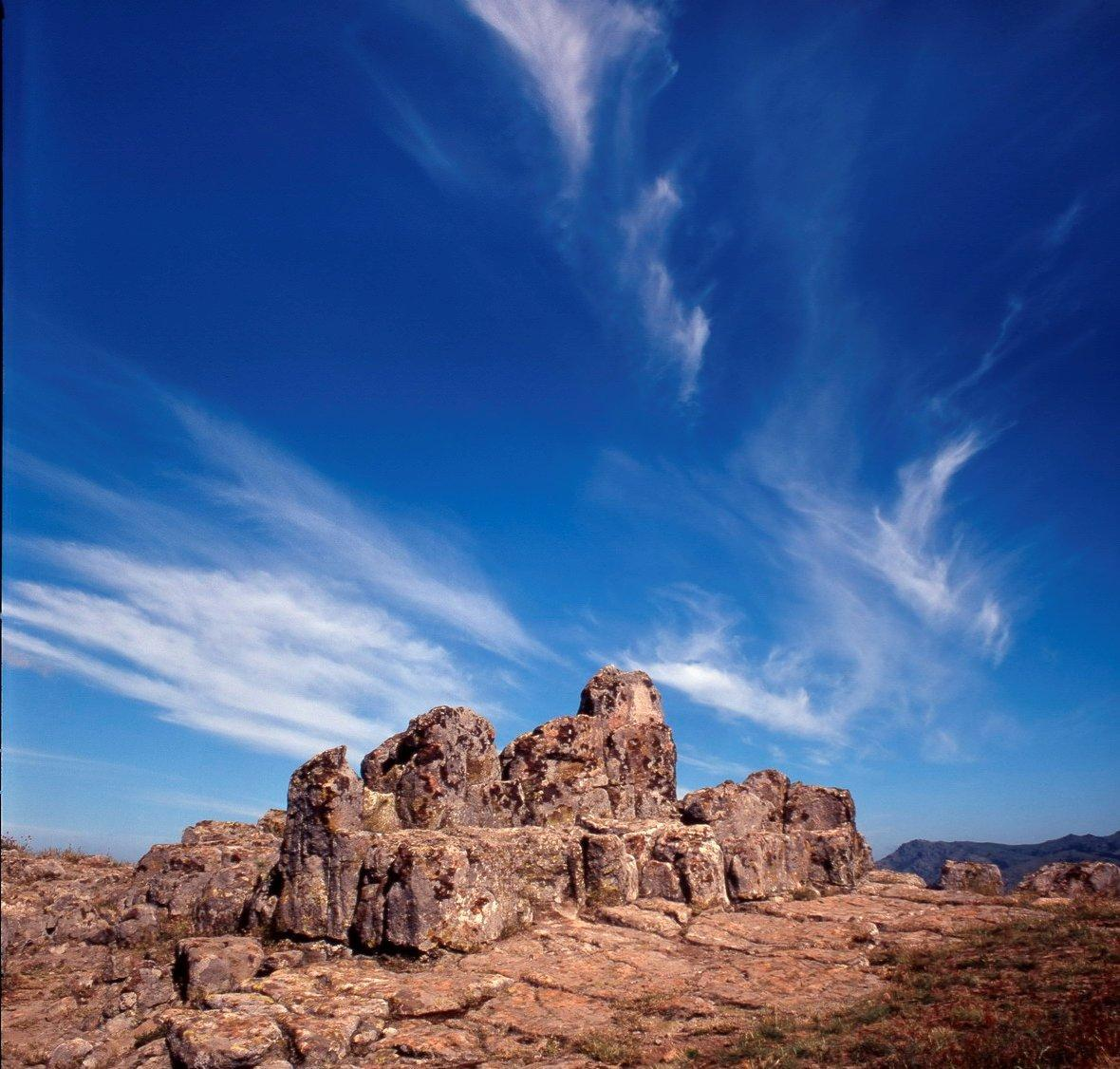
The summit of Tatićev Kamen

Kokino (Macedonian: Кокино) is a Bronze Age archaeological site in North Macedonia, approximately 30 km from the town of Kumanovo, and about 6 km from the Serbian border, in the Staro Nagoričane Municipality. It is situated between about 1010 and 1030 m above sea level on the Tatićev Kamen (Татиќев камен) summit and covers an area of about 90 by 50 meters, overlooking the eponymous hamlet of Kokino.

== History ==
It was discovered by archeologist Jovica Stankovski, director of the national museum in Kumanovo, in 2001. In 2002, Stankovski together with Gorje Cenev (who is the head of a planetarium at a Youth Cultural Center in Skopje) published the claim that the site contains a "megalithic observatory and sacred site" (мегалитска опсерваторија и светилиште).

== Archaeological site ==
The wider Kokino archaeological site covers about 30 hectares. The oldest archaeological finds date from about the 19th century BC, corresponding to the early European Bronze Age. It shows signs of occupation for the period from the 19th to the 7th centuries BC. Finds from the Middle Bronze Age (c. 16th to 14th centuries BC) are the most numerous (mainly ceramic vessels, stone-mills, a few molds, and a pendant). An agglomeration from the Iron Age was discovered in 2009. The remains of vessels filled with offerings were found deposited in cracks in the rocks, which gave rise to the interpretation of the site as a "holy mountain".

== Megalithic observatory ==
The Kokino "megalithic observatory" should be distinguished from the wider Kokino archaeological site. The claimed archaeoastronomical site has a combined area of about 5000 square meters and consists of two platforms with an elevation difference of 19 meters. The claim of the site representing an astronomical observatory was made by Stankovski and by Gjore Cenev in 2002. According to this interpretation, the site includes special stone markers used to track the movement of the Sun and Moon on the eastern horizon. The observatory used the method of stationary observation, marking positions of the Sun at the winter and summer solstice, as well as the equinox. Four stone seats or "thrones" are placed in a row on the lower platform. According to Cenev, a stone block with a marking on the upper platform marks the direction of sunrise on summer solstice when viewed from one of the seats. Kokino was briefly mentioned in a poster made by NASA's "Sun-Earth Connection Education Forum" in 2005, although in a recent survey of ancient "observatories", the Kokino site was described as "a particularly problematic case".

== Protection ==
The Cultural Heritage Protection Office of Macedonia's Ministry of Culture declared the site a "property under temporary protection" on 13 November 2008 (Decision nr. 08-1935/6). In 2009, Minister of Culture Elizabeta Kancheska-Milevska declared Kokino "one of the priorities of the Ministry of Culture’s 2009 programme". In 2009, the Republic of Macedonia also suggested the site be inscribed on UNESCO's World Heritage Site list. After its formal nomination in 2011 for inclusion on the World Heritage List, the Kokino site's nomination dossier was rejected because the number of possible observing points and markers could indicate an astronomical alignment by chance.

== Bibliography ==
- Cenev, Gjore (2002), Мегалитска обзерваторија на Кокино, Муѕејски Гласник, Народен Музеј на Куманово, vol. 7-9, 2002, 49 – 68.
- Cenev, Gjore (2004), The Sky Over Macedonia, MKC, p 38-40, 85-114, Skopje.
- Cenev, Gjore (2007), Archeo-Astronomical Characteristics of the Kokino Archaeological sites, Astrophysical Investigations, Institute of Astronomy at Bulgarian academy of science, no 9, Sofija.
- Cenev, Gjore, Megalithic observatory Kokino, Publications of the Astronomical Observatory of Belgrade, Vol. 80, p. 313-317
- Stankovski Jovica (2002), Татиќев Камен – мегалитска опсерваторија и светилиште, Музејски гласник бр.7 - 9, Народен музеј - Куманово, 29-39.
- Stankovski, Jovica (2003) Три мегалитни споменици во кумановскиот регион, Пирајхме 2, Народен Музеј Куманово.
- Stankovski, Jovica (2007), Кокино - светилиште и стара опсерваторија, Зборник посветен на К. Јорданов, Институт по тракологија, Sofija.
- Volcevska, Biljana, Kokino, Megalithic Ancient Observatory, World Heritage Studies, Cottbus 2011.
