= Adzi Tepe Airport =

Adzi Tepe Airport Аеродром Аџи Тепе
- IATA: none; ICAO: none

Summary
- Airport type: Sport; Military
- Serves: Kumanovo
- Location: Kumanovo, North Macedonia
- Coordinates: 42°09′29″N 021°41′36″E

Map
- Location in North Macedonia

Adzi Tepe Airport (Аџи Тепе Аеродром) is an airport in Kumanovo, North Macedonia.

== Events ==
Airshow Kumanovo is held at the airport.

== See also ==
- Kumanovo
