= TV Festa =

TV Festa ТВ Феста
- Country: North Macedonia
- Broadcast area: Kumanovo, Lipkovo
- Headquarters: Kumanovo, North Macedonia

Programming
- Language(s): Albanian

Links
- Website: tvfesta.net

Availability

Terrestrial
- Digital: Channel ?

TV Festa is an Albanian language local television channel in Kumanovo, North Macedonia. The station started broadcasting on 21 March 1996, its founder was journalist Nexhat Aqifi.

== See also ==
- Kumanovo
