= Biserka =

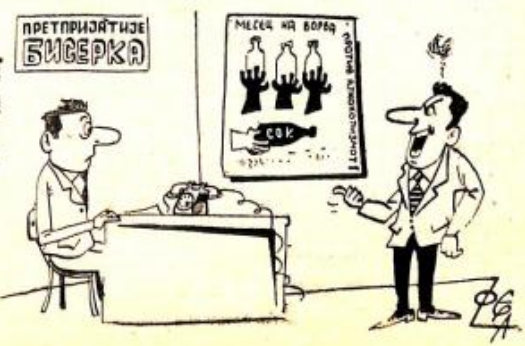
Naš Vesnik newspaper caricature (1962) - Biserka

Biserka (Macedonian: Бисерка) is a former hospitality company from Kumanovo, North Macedonia. The company was founded in 1954 consisting of a few bars and restaurants and 30-40 employees.

Later, the company added the only hotel in the town, Hotel Kumanovo, and the local spa Kumanovska Banja with an old restaurant. Shortly after, hotels and restaurants were added to Biserka such as: Mostar, Lovec, and Palas. The restaurants Skopje, Evropa, Bratstvo, Invalidski an and Jachkov an, were also added to the company. This helped the company to grow stronger and invest in new enterprises.

In 1960/61 Biserka built the restaurant Kristal in the center of the town, rated category "C" with 1000 seats for guests. Investments continued with Hotel Ku-ba, which is category "B" with 104 beds and a restaurant for 1000 guests. In 1965 the bar Kristal was opened in the basement of the Hotel Kristal.
