= TV KRT Dalga, Kumanovo =

TV KRT Dalga ТВ КРТ Далга
- Country: North Macedonia
- Broadcast area: Kumanovo; Lipkovo; Staro Nagorichane
- Headquarters: Kumanovo, North Macedonia

Programming
- Language(s): Macedonian

Ownership
- Owner: Biljana Zafirovska
- Key people: Gordana Milkovska

History
- Closed: 6 March 2019

Availability

Terrestrial
- Analog: Channel 015
- Digital: Channel 015

TV KRT Dalga (or just KRT) (North Macedonia Cyrillic: ТВ КРТ Далга) was a local television channel in Kumanovo, North Macedonia.

== See also ==
Kumanovo
