= Chetiri Bandere Monument =

- Споменик Четири Бандере
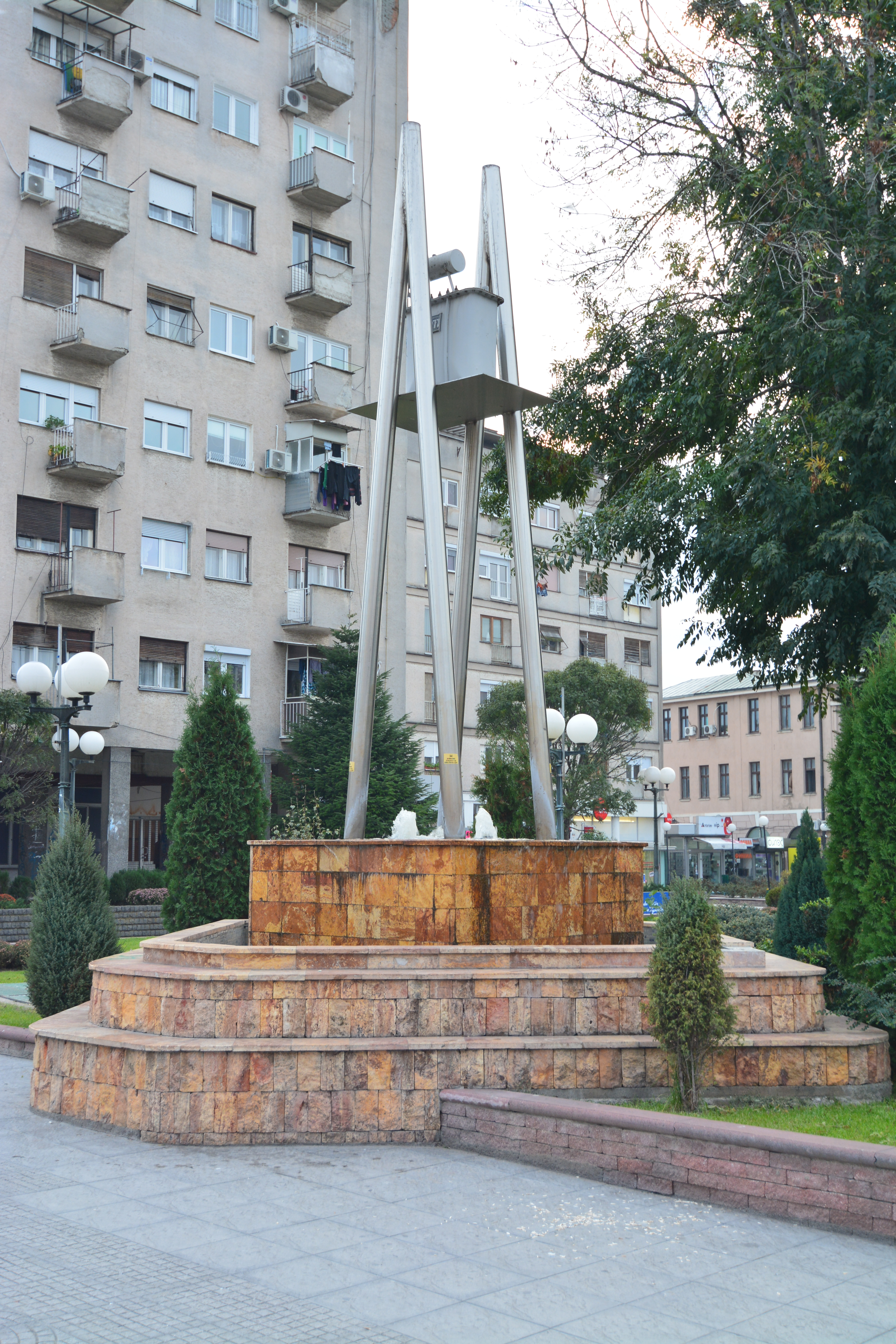
- Chetiri Bandere Monument on Nova Jugoslavija Square
- Location: Kumanovo, North Macedonia
- Dedicated to: Famous point of meeting for local citizens

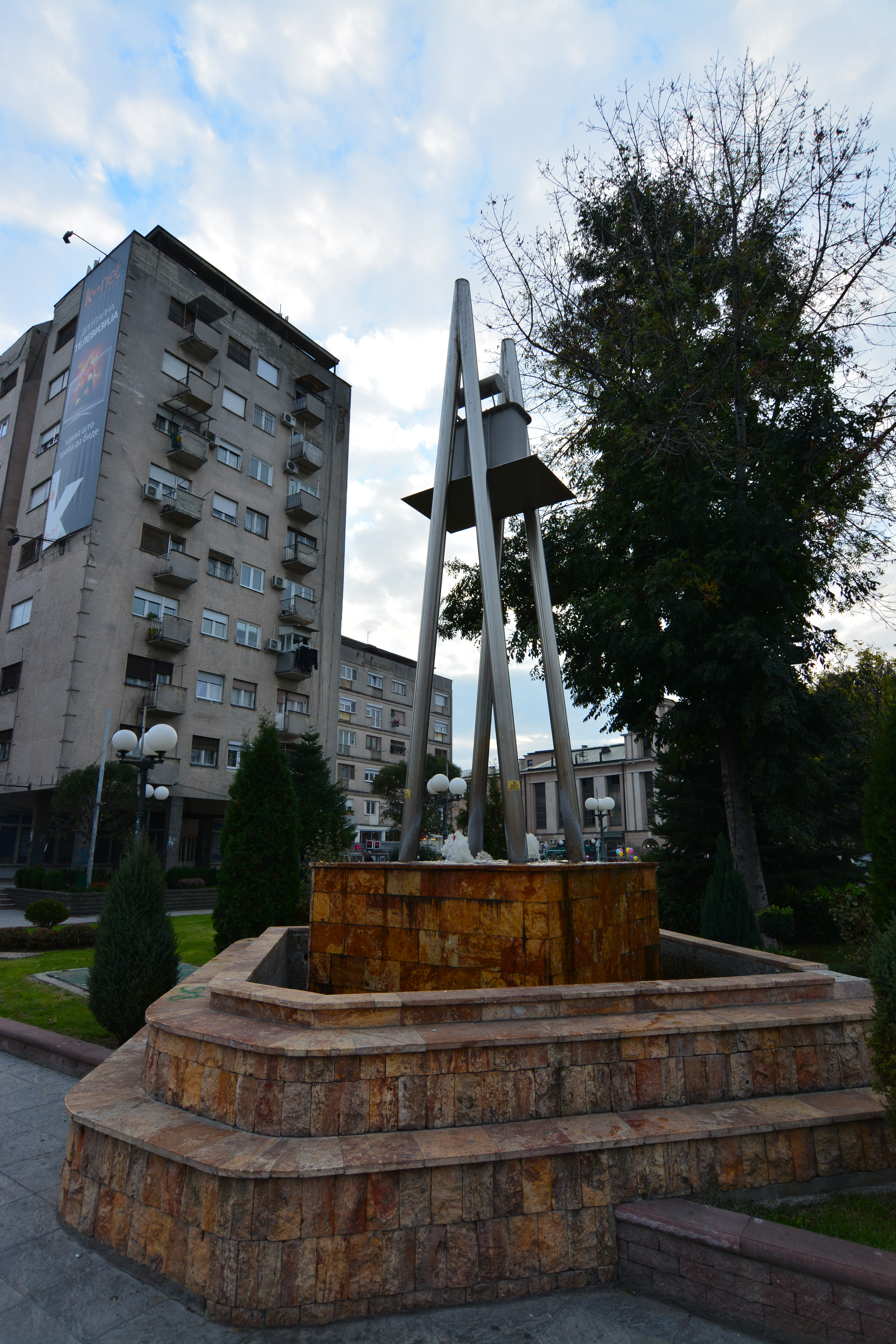
Chetiri Bandere

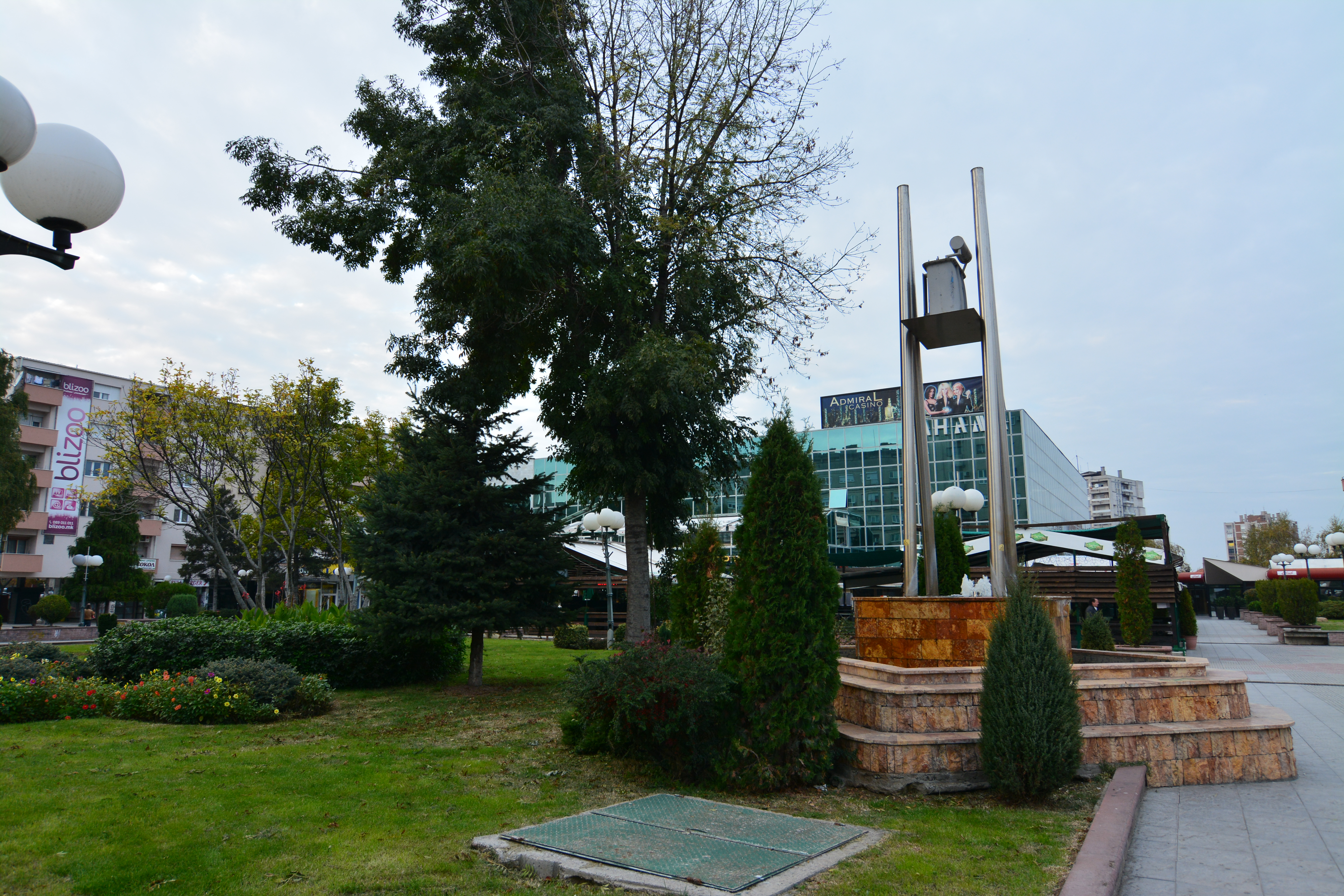
Chetiri Bandere 2

Chetiri Bandere Monument (English: Four Pools) (Macedonian Cyrillic: Четири бандере) is a monument in Kumanovo, North Macedonia. The monument is a replica of the city's first transformer which functioned from 1926 until the mid 1950s. It was located in the centre of the city so in that way became a symbol of it.

== See also ==
Kumanovo
