= Batko Gjorgjija =

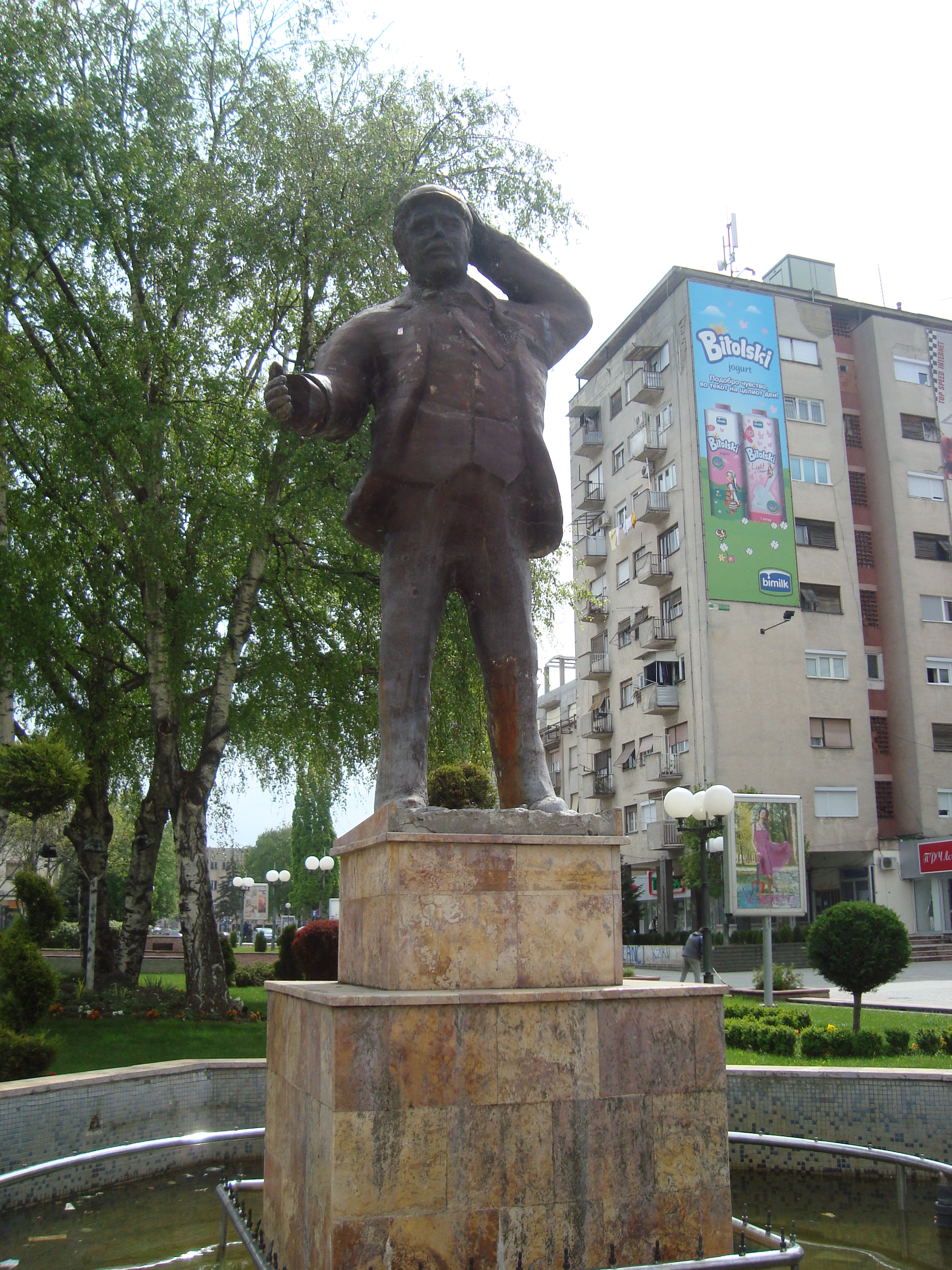
Statue of Batko Gjorgjija in Kumanovo

Batko Gjorgjija or Uncle Gjorgjija is a historical figure of Kumanovo, North Macedonia, who had been a great mocker and bohemian and preferred leading a loose life rather than working. It is said in the most popular folk song that he had died with three wishes: for a pretty woman, a brandy and an expensive cart. The Days of Comedy take place every year in honor of Batko Gjorgjija.
