= Kumanovska Banja =

Thermal spring in Macedonia

Kumanovska Banja Кумановска Бања
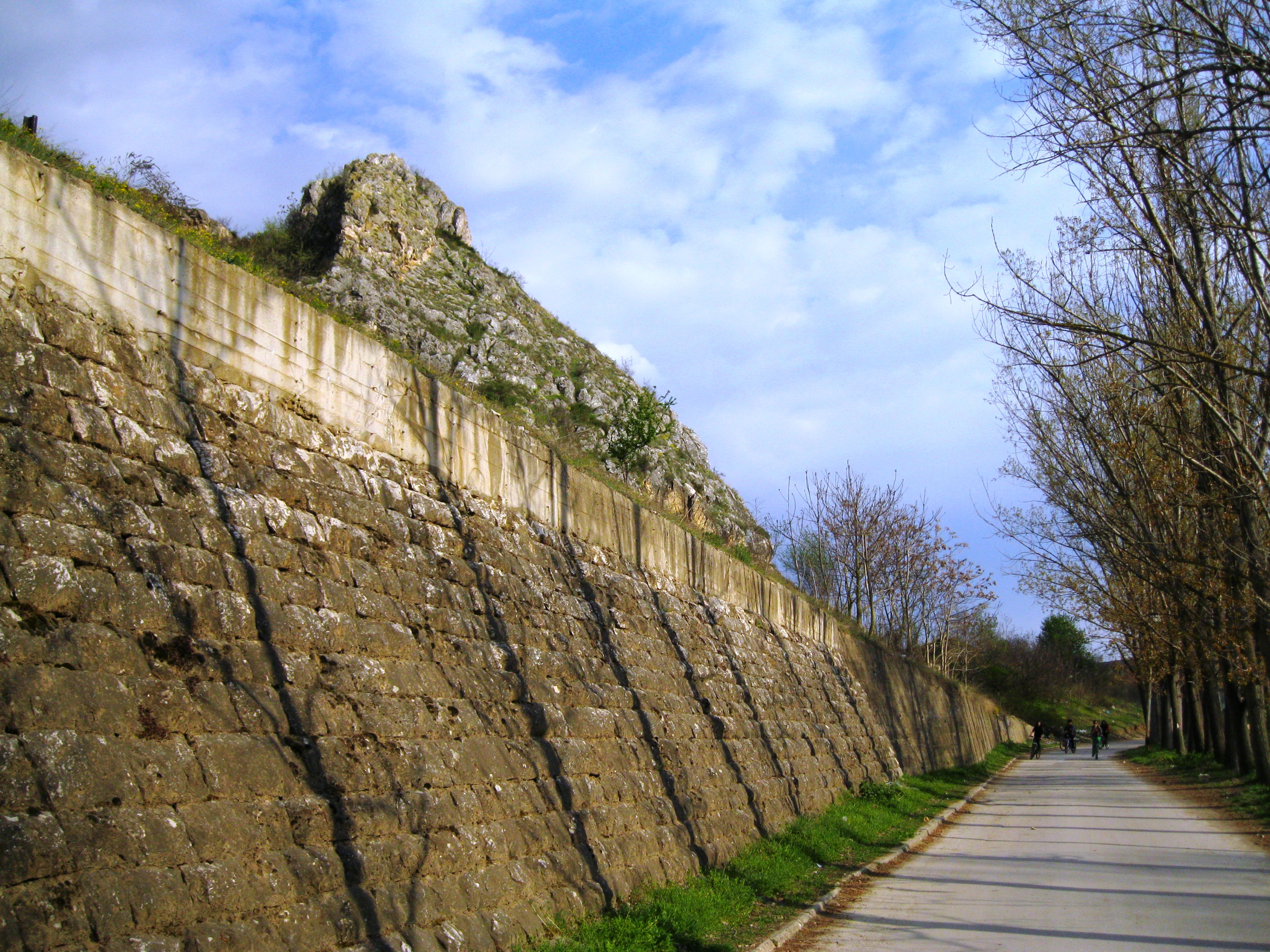
- Street near Kumanovska Banja
- Type: Urban park
- Location: Proevce, Kumanovo, North Macedonia
- Status: Open all year

Kumanovska Banja (Macedonian: Кумановска Бања) or Kisela Voda (Macedonian: Кисела Вода) is a mineral spa in the Proevce 3 km from Kumanovo, North Macedonia. The first registered analysis of the water was in 1920 by Aleksej Scherbakov in the State Laboratory in Belgrade. Kingdom of Serbs, Croats and Slovenians. Analysis proved that the water is Alkaline earth water, with temperature of 28 degrees Celsius and 2.5 liters flow per second. He published the results with the title Кисењаци код Жепче и Куманова (Kisenjaci kod Žepče i Kumanova, Oxygen workers at Žepče and Kumanovo) in 1928. The next analysis took place in 1952 by Aleksandar Butkov, the foundlings stated that the temperature is 30 degrees Celsius and flow of 2.37 liters per second. Second water source was discovered that same year by the road to the village of Zubovce with flow of 0.181 liters per second and the temperature is 27 degrees Celsius. In 1954 the Kumanovo communist local government gave the Kumanovska Banja to Biserka company. The spa has not operated since the summer of 2012. The spa has been operating again since 2015.
