= K3 Television =

K3 Television К3 Телевизиjа
- Country: North Macedonia
- Broadcast area: (Northeastern Macedonia); Kumanovo; Kriva Palanka; Kratovo; Staro Nagorichane; Rankovce; Lipkovo
- Network: Mediation and Consulting Company NVSP DOOEL Skopje
- Headquarters: Kumanovo, North Macedonia

Programming
- Language(s): Macedonian

Ownership
- Owner: Vladislav Stajkovikj
- Key people: Elena Mihajlovska; Irena Beleshkovska
- Sister channels: Radio Slobodna Makedonija

History
- Launched: December 28, 2013 (11 years ago)
- Closed: 27 March 2019
- Former names: Zlaten Kanal (Kriva Palanka)

Availability

Terrestrial
- Digital: Channel 013

K3 Television (Macedonian: К3 Телевизиjа, romanized: K3 Televizija) was a regional Television channel in Northeast part of North Macedonia, with headquarters in Kumanovo. It started to operate in 2015.

== Line up ==
- News (Macedonian Cyrillic: Вести)

== See also ==
- Kumanovo
