= Sredorek (Roma neighbourhood) =

Sredorek (Macedonian: Средорек) is a Roma neighborhood in Kumanovo, North Macedonia. The population is about 3500. Most of the Roma inhabitants of the neighborhood are Sunni Muslims, there was an unsuccessful attempt of building a mosque.
