= Gradište, Kumanovo =

Gradište Градиште
- Village
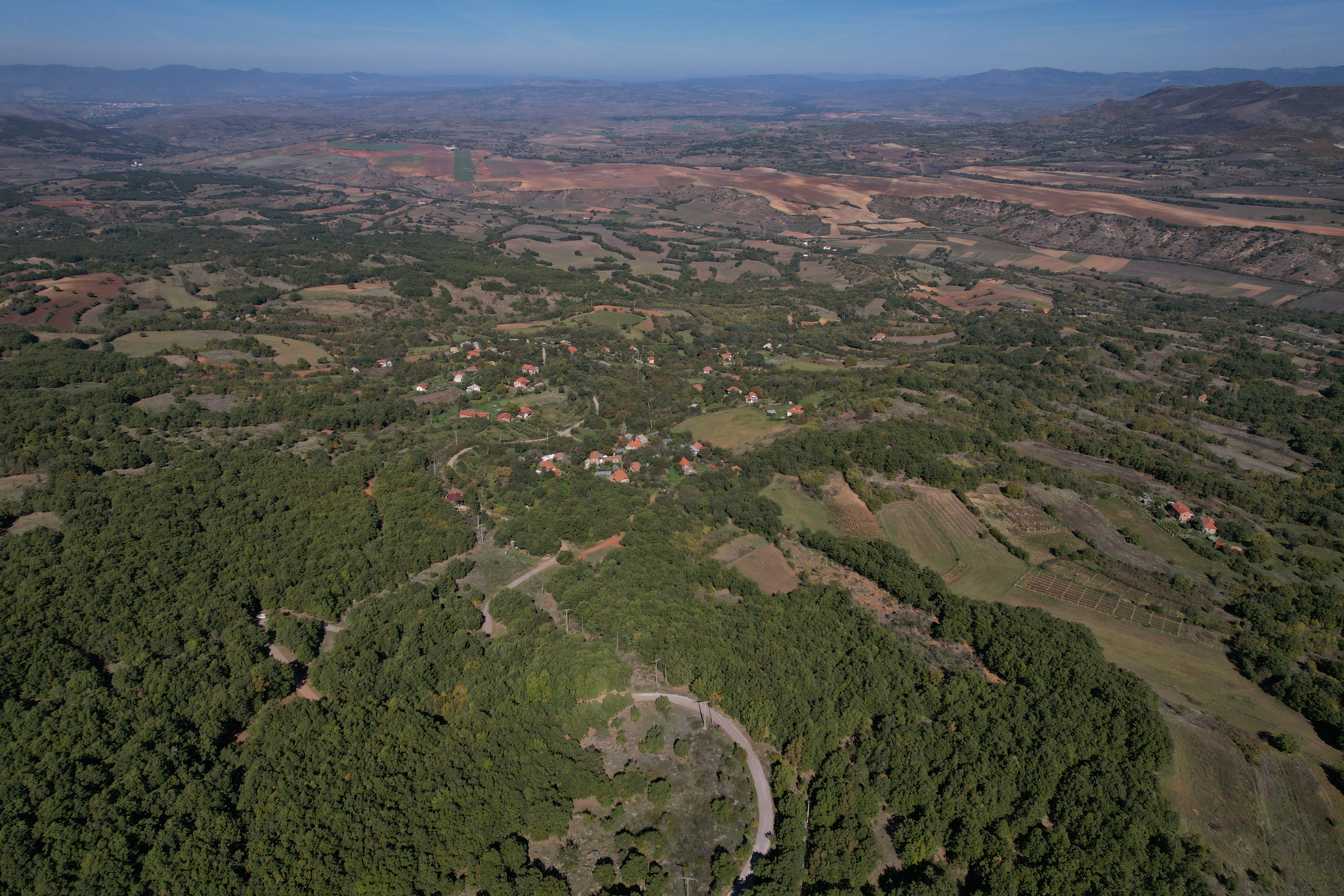
- Airview of the village

- Location within North Macedonia
- Coordinates: 42°01′23″N 21°53′16″E
- Country: North Macedonia
- Region: Northeastern
- Municipality: Kumanovo

Population (2021)
  - Total: 127
- Time zone: UTC+1 (CET)
  - Summer (DST): UTC+2 (CEST)
- Postal code: 1309
- Car plates: KU
- Website: .

Gradište (Macedonian: Градиште) is a village in the municipality of Kumanovo, North Macedonia.

== History ==
Ancient ritualistic Hellenistic sites dating to the Macedonian Empire have been found in Gradište. This includes a ritual dining complex. The complex contained bones from wild boars, goats, and other animals. These are believed to suggest ritual feasting was done at the site. Pottery, including pithoi, have also been found, such as one depicting Demeter.

== Demographics ==
As of the 2021 census, Gradište had 127 residents with the following ethnic composition:

- Macedonians 119
- Albanians 1
- Persons for whom data are taken from administrative sources 7
