= Helsinki Committee for Human Rights of the Republic of North Macedonia =

Non-governmental organization

The Helsinki Committee for Human Rights of the Republic of North Macedonia, also known as the Macedonian Helsinki Committee (MHC), is a non-governmental organization that promotes human rights and monitors human rights violations in the North Macedonia in accordance with the Helsinki Accords.

The Committee was founded on October 6, 1994, in Skopje. In 1995, the MHC became a member of the International Helsinki Federation for Human Rights until the IHF's dissolution in 2007.
