= Ploshtad =

Newspaper in Kumanovo, North Macedonia

Ploshtad Плоштад
- Owner: Marjan Petrushevski
- Founder: Marjan Petrushevski
- Editor: Marjan Petrushevski
- Launched: January 11, 2013; 13 years ago
- Language: Macedonian
- City: Kumanovo
- Country: Macedonia (present-day North Macedonia)
- Free online archives: No

Ploshtad (Macedonian: Плоштад) was a weekly newspaper in Kumanovo, Macedonia (present-day North Macedonia) that started to work since 2013. Newspaper editor was Marjan Petrushevski. The newspaper price was 20 MKD.
