= TV Nova (Kumanovo) =

TV Nova ТВ Нова
- Country: North Macedonia
- Broadcast area: Kumanovo
- Network: Nova DOOEL Kumanovo
- Headquarters: Kumanovo, North Macedonia

Programming
- Language: Macedonian
- Picture format: 16:9 (576i, SDTV); 16:9

History
- Closed: 2012
- Former names: TV Zora (ТВ Зора)

Availability

Terrestrial
- Analog: Closed

TV Nova was a local television channel in Kumanovo, North Macedonia. Its director was Marjan Stoshevski. TV Nova was robbed in 2012 and lost some of its equipment, but it did not interfere with the work of the station.

== See also ==
Television in North Macedonia
