= TV Kumanovo =

TV channel in Kumanovo, North Macedonia

TV Kumanovo ТВ Куманово
- Country: North Macedonia
- Broadcast area: Kumanovo; Lipkovo; Staro Nagorichane
- Affiliates: Nash Vesnik, Radio Kumanovo
- Headquarters: Kumanovo, North Macedonia

Programming
- Language(s): Macedonian

Ownership
- Owner: NRIO "Nash Vesnik"
- Key people: Tatjana Arsovska, Stole Bozinovski

History
- Launched: 15 April 1994; 31 years ago
- Closed: 6 December 2006; 18 years ago

TV Kumanovo (Macedonian: ТВ Куманово) was a local terrestrial analog television channel in Kumanovo, North Macedonia.

== See also ==
- Television in North Macedonia
