= Kumanovo =

Kumanovo Куманово (Macedonian) Кumanovë (Albanian)
- Town
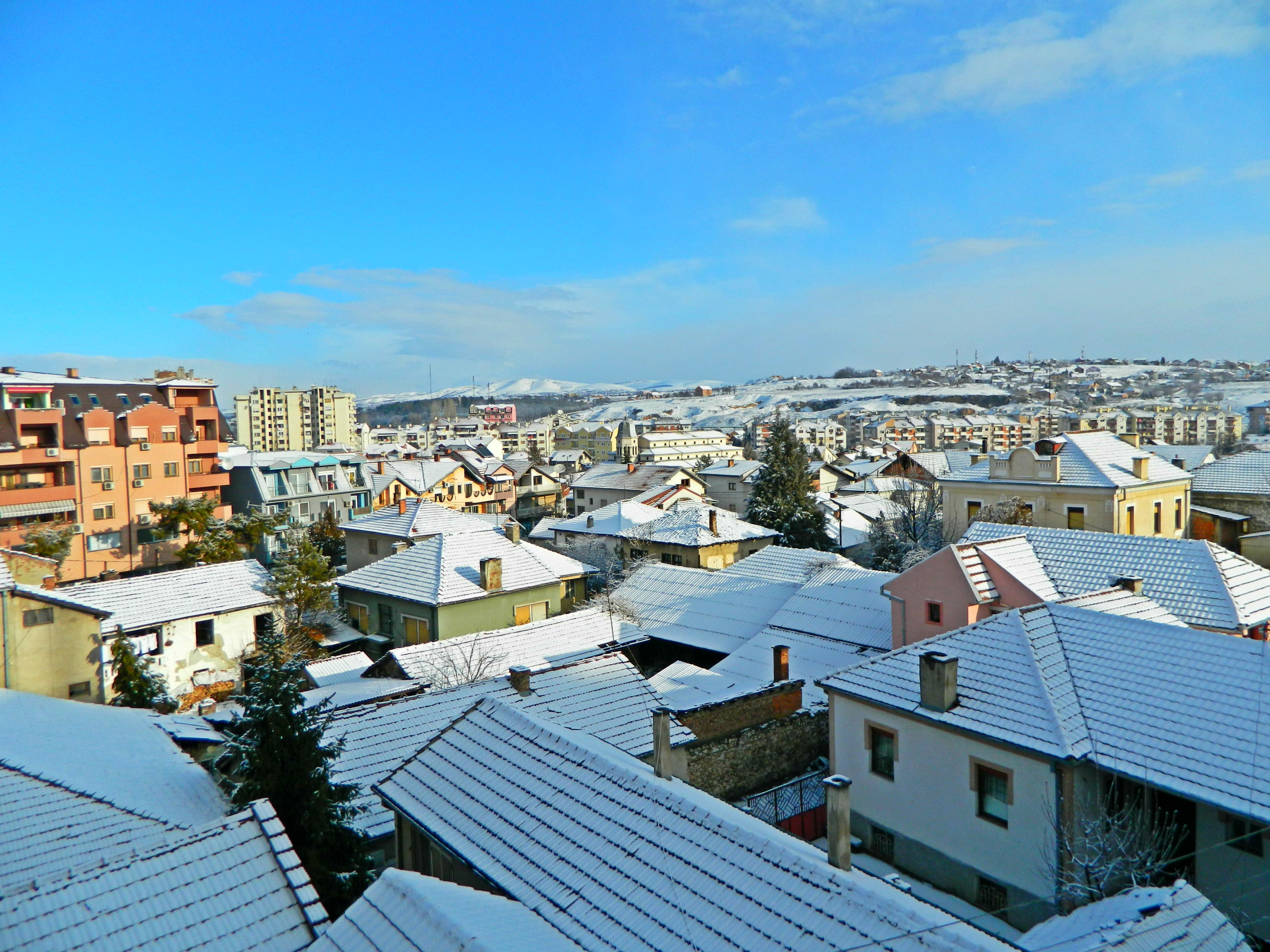
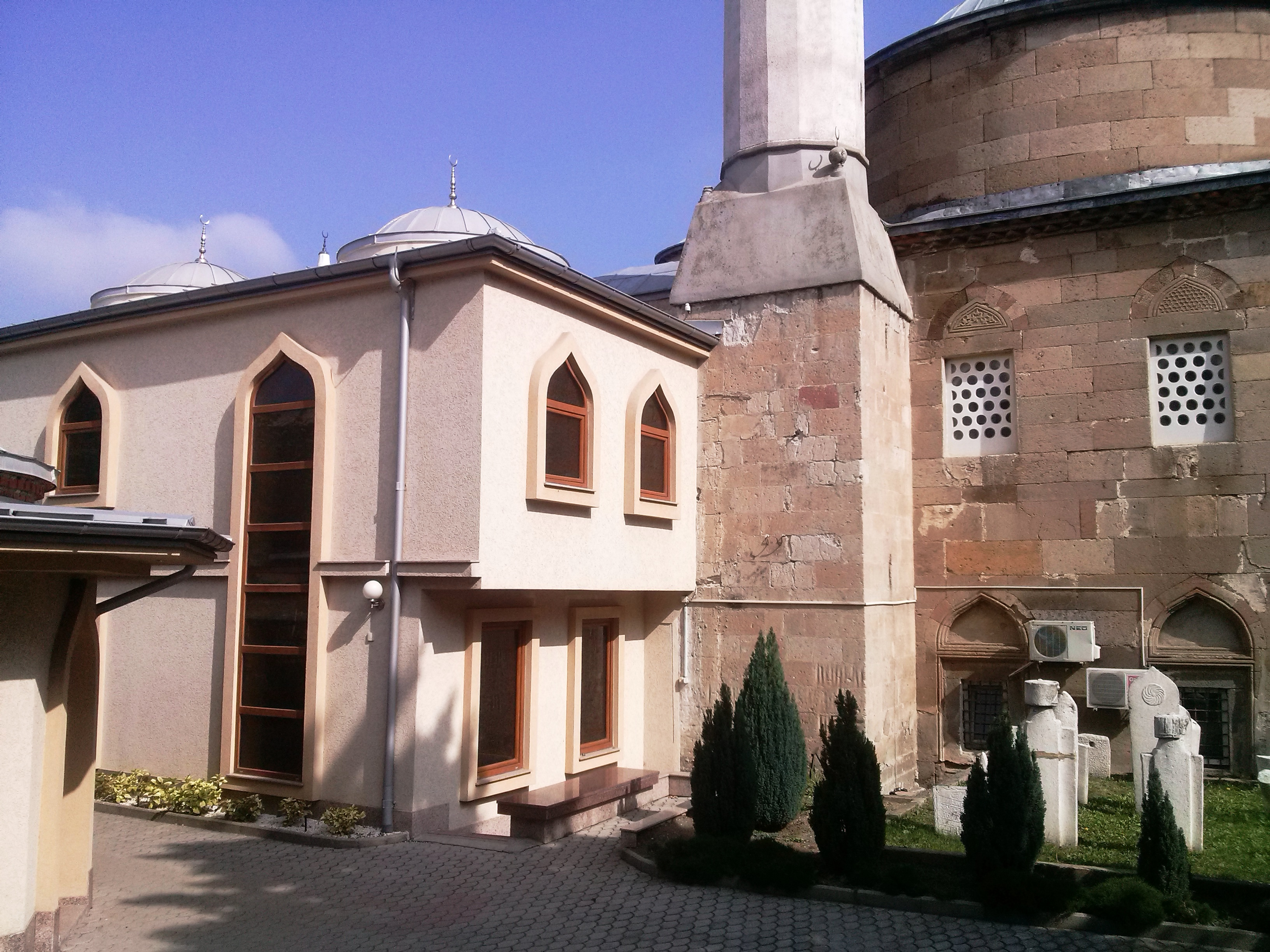
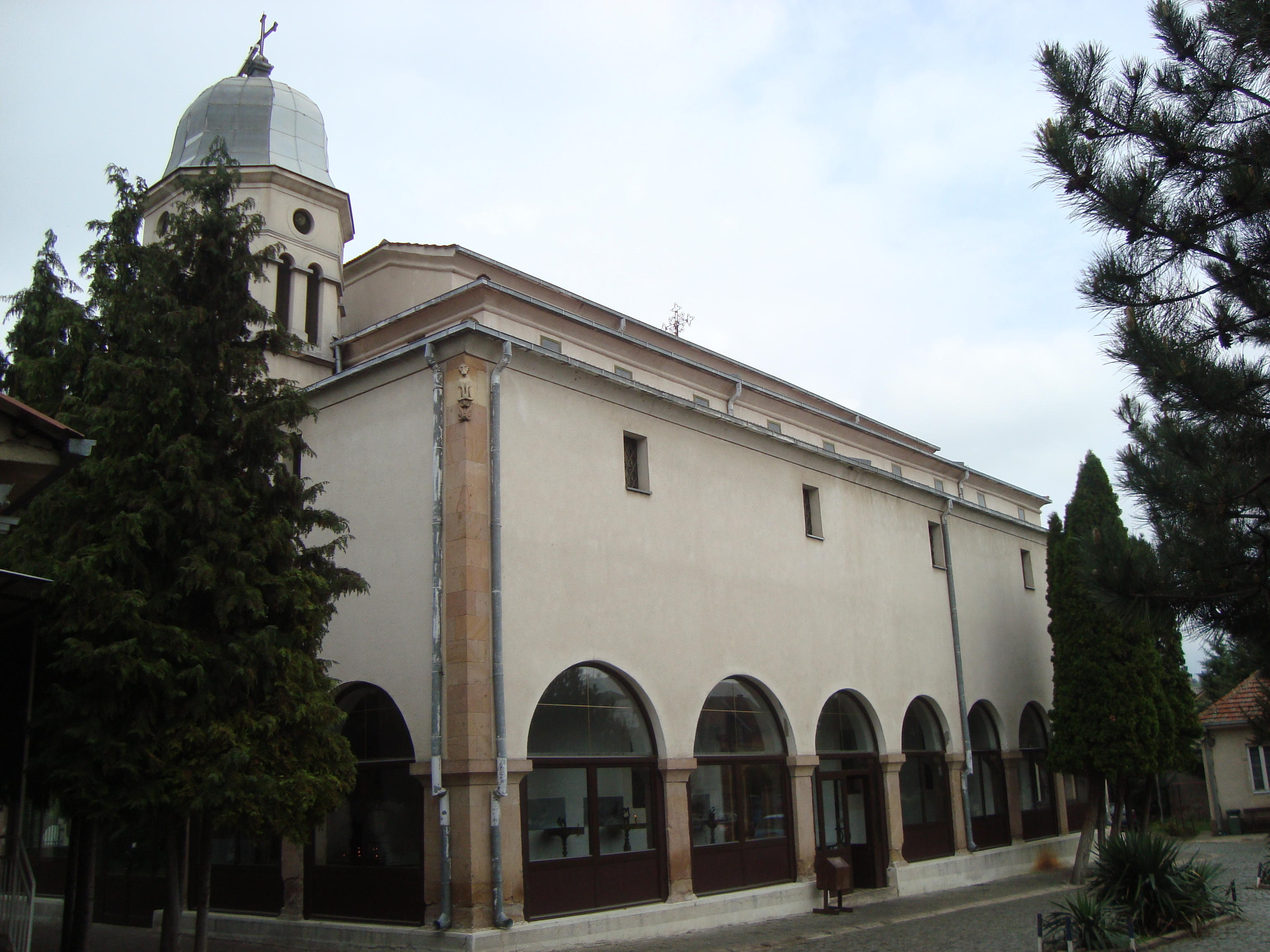
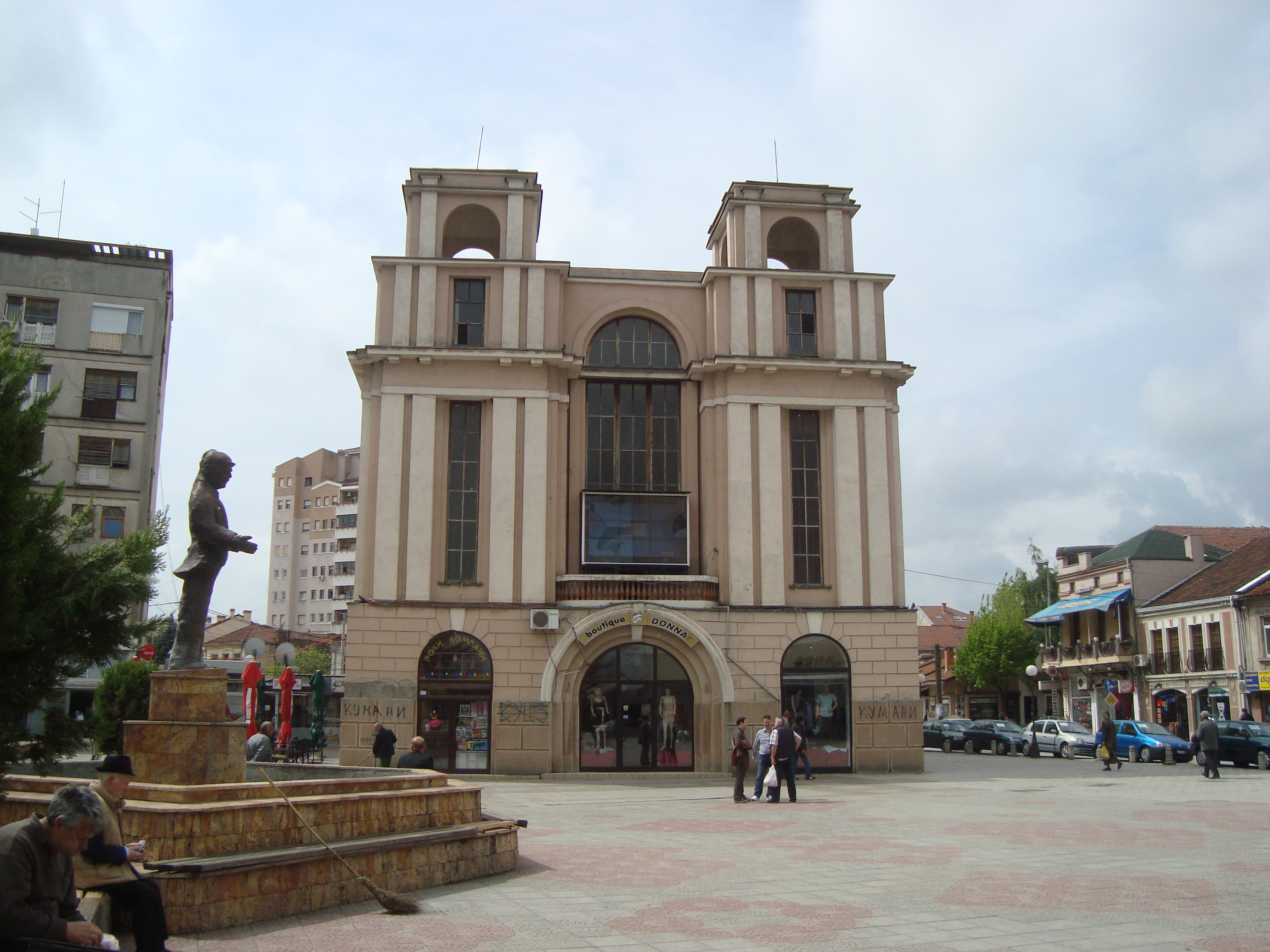
- View of the city Old Mosque St. Nikola Church Nova Jugoslavija Square

- Flag Seal
- Nickname: Kumanovska Republika (Kumanovo Republic)
- Map of Kumanovo

- Location of Kumanovo within North Macedonia Kumanovo (Balkans)
- Coordinates: 42°08′09″N 21°43′05″E
- Country: North Macedonia
- Region: Northeastern
- Municipality: Kumanovo
- Founded: 12th century
- Incorporated: 1519
- Named after: tribe Cumans

Government
  - Type: Town Assembly
  - Mayor: Maksim Dimitrievski (ZNAM)
  - Town Council: Members: Ivana Gjorgjievska – Council President

Area
  - Town: 509.48 km^{2} (196.71 sq mi)
- Elevation: 340 m (1,120 ft)

Population (2021)
  - Town: 75,051
  - Density: 207.04/km^{2} (536.2/sq mi)
  - Metro: 98,104
- Demonym: Kumanovec Kumanovac
- Time zone: UTC+1 (CET)
- Postal codes: 1300
- Area code: +389 (0) 31
- Vehicle registration: KU
- Patron saints: St. George
- Date of Liberation: 11 November 1944
- Climate: Cfa
- Website: kumanovo.gov.mk

Kumanovo (Macedonian: Куманово [kuˈmanɔvɔ]; Albanian: Kumanovë, Albanian definite form: Kumanova; also known by other alternative names) is the second-largest city in North Macedonia after the capital Skopje and the seat of Kumanovo Municipality, the largest municipality in the country. Kumanovo lies 340 metres (1,115 feet) above sea level and is surrounded by the Karadag part of Skopska Crna Gora mountain on its western side, Gradištanska mountain on its southern side, and Mangovica and German mountain on the eastern side. The Skopje Airport also serves Kumanovo.

It has many historical sites. One of its most important is the 4,000-year-old megalithic astronomical observatory of Kokino, located 30 km (19 mi) northeast of Kumanovo and discovered in 2001. It is ranked fourth on the list of old observatories by NASA.

In 1912, during the First Balkan War, Serbian forces won a decisive victory over the Ottomans north of the town. The two-day Battle of Kumanovo ended Ottoman authority in Vardar Macedonia which contributed to the region's integration into Serbia, and consequently into Yugoslavia. The entire region of Macedonia was split in three between Serbia, Greece and Bulgaria after the Treaty of Bucharest in 1913.

During World War II, the communist resistance in Vardar Macedonia began in Kumanovo on 11 October 1941. The rapid economic, administrative and cultural expansion of Kumanovo began in 1945. The town's metal-processing, tobacco, agriculture, footwear and textile industries made it an economic, trading and cultural center during the time of SFR Yugoslavia.

It was the site of the 1999 Kumanovo Agreement between FR Yugoslavia and NATO about bringing in a NATO peacekeeping contingent in Kosovo.

It is internationally known for a jazz festival hosting bands from all over the world.

== Etymology ==
The name of the city in Macedonian, Serbian and Bulgarian is Kumanovo (Куманово). The name in Albanian is Kumanovë or Kumanova. Kumanovo is known as Cumanuva in Aromanian. Kumanovo derives from the name of the Cumans, a western branch of Kipchaks, the tribe that settled in the area in the early 12th century.

== Geography ==
Kumanovo is situated in the northern parts of North Macedonia, 30 km (18 mi) northeast of the capital city of Skopje. The coordinates of the city are approximately 42°05'N and 21°40'E. Kumanovo lies 340 metres (1,115 feet) above sea level and is surrounded by:

- Karadag part of Skopska Crna Gora mountain on its western side
- Gradištanska mountain on its southern side
- Mangovica and German mountain on the eastern side

Veleška Maalo (or Veleško Maalo) is an old neighbourhood of Kumanovo. The name comes from the merchants from the town of Veles, who passed through the neighbourhood to sell their products by the rivers Vardar and Pčinja, and the Konjarinja villages Studena, Bara and Krasta. The main street, which today is named Narodna Revolucija, was their shortest way to the center of the city.

Karapsko maalo was located across today's south side of Goce Delčev High School through to the end of Moša Pijade street. The name of the neighborhood came from the Ottomans. Every house in the neighborhood had a yard; neighboring yard were connected with doors, used by anyone chased by the Ottomans. Macedonians, komits and revolutionaries used this scheme to escape to the towns outskirts and the town itself. The Ottomans called it the dark or the secret neighborhood.

=== Military installations ===
The military base Boro Menkov is one of the military installations of ARM in Kumanovo. The base was established by the JNA.

MB Hristijan Todorovski - Karpoš is the second base in Kumanovo, it was also established by the JNA and was inherited by the ARM. Today, part of the installation is converted into a university, and another part was inherited by the Ministry of Interior. There was an idea of turning the base into an economic industrial zone.

In Kumanovo's Elezov kamen area there is also a Military Warehouse Base that operates today.

=== Police station ===
Kumanovo has a police station, under the Ministry of Internal Affairs. The current police chief is Nikica Petruševski.

=== Climate ===
Kumanovo has a humid subtropical climate (Köppen climate classification: Cfa) with warm to hot summers and chilly winters. Precipitation is more or less evenly distributed throughout the year.

Climate data for Kumanovo
Month	Jan	Feb	Mar	Apr	May	Jun	Jul	Aug	Sep	Oct	Nov	Dec	Year
Mean daily maximum °C (°F)	4.0 (39.2)	7.6 (45.7)	12.6 (54.7)	17.6 (63.7)	22.3 (72.1)	26.6 (79.9)	29.4 (84.9)	29.6 (85.3)	25.7 (78.3)	18.9 (66.0)	11.5 (52.7)	5.3 (41.5)	17.6 (63.7)
Daily mean °C (°F)	0.4 (32.7)	2.9 (37.2)	7.2 (45.0)	11.7 (53.1)	16.1 (61.0)	19.8 (67.6)	22.1 (71.8)	22.1 (71.8)	18.5 (65.3)	13.0 (55.4)	7.0 (44.6)	1.9 (35.4)	11.9 (53.4)
Mean daily minimum °C (°F)	−3.2 (26.2)	−1.7 (28.9)	1.9 (35.4)	5.8 (42.4)	10.0 (50.0)	13.1 (55.6)	14.8 (58.6)	14.6 (58.3)	11.4 (52.5)	7.1 (44.8)	2.6 (36.7)	−1.5 (29.3)	6.2 (43.2)
Average precipitation mm (inches)	38 (1.5)	35 (1.4)	38 (1.5)	42 (1.7)	59 (2.3)	49 (1.9)	38 (1.5)	32 (1.3)	38 (1.5)	45 (1.8)	55 (2.2)	48 (1.9)	517 (20.5)
Source: Climate-Data.org

== History ==
=== Prehistory ===
The Kumanovo area has been inhabited for thousands of years. The Kostoperska Karpa, a large basaltic megalithic site, dates back to the Chalcolithic age. Kostoperska Karpa is found along an ancient route from Skopje to Sofia.

In the nearby town of Gradište, ancient ritualistic Hellenistic sites dating to the Macedonian Empire have been found. This includes a ritual dining complex. The complex contained bones from wild boars, goats, and other animals. These are believed to suggest ritual feasting was done at the site. Pottery, including pithoi, have also been found, such as one depicting Demeter.

=== Middle Ages ===
The first written mentioning of the individual modern villages of the Kumanovo region originate in the 14th century. These are, for the most part, found in Serbian charters, such as those of King Stefan Milutin, Emperor Stefan Dušan, Sevastokrator Dejan, Jevdokija Dejanović and Dejan's sons, Jovan and Konstantin.

In this time, the Kumanovo region (old Žegligovo) received its geographical location and certain settlement picture.

According to a charter of the monastery of Arhiljevica dated 1355, sevastokrator Dejan held a major domain (oblast) east of Skopska Crna Gora. It included the old župe (counties) of Žegligovo and Preševo (modern Kumanovo region with Sredorek and Kozjačija).

=== Ottoman period ===
The town was first mentioned in 1530 according to registry of Turkish Devlet Arşivleri as a village in Nogoriçe town, within Kaza of İştip, but was established slightly earlier, in 1519. It was founded by Turkish colonists from Asia Minor and initially was settled by Turks and later by Muslim Albanians. Slavic population entered the town in the late 18th century but its number rose just during early 19th century. Evliya Çelebi described it in 1660–61: "The colony of Kumanovo is situated on the territory of the Skopje sanjak and represents one county. The city is embellished with many rivers and 600 tile-roof houses. The mosque in the downtown is beautiful, there are tekke, madrassa, hammam, a number of shops and water mills; and the climate is pleasant and agreeable. There are many vineyards and gardens".

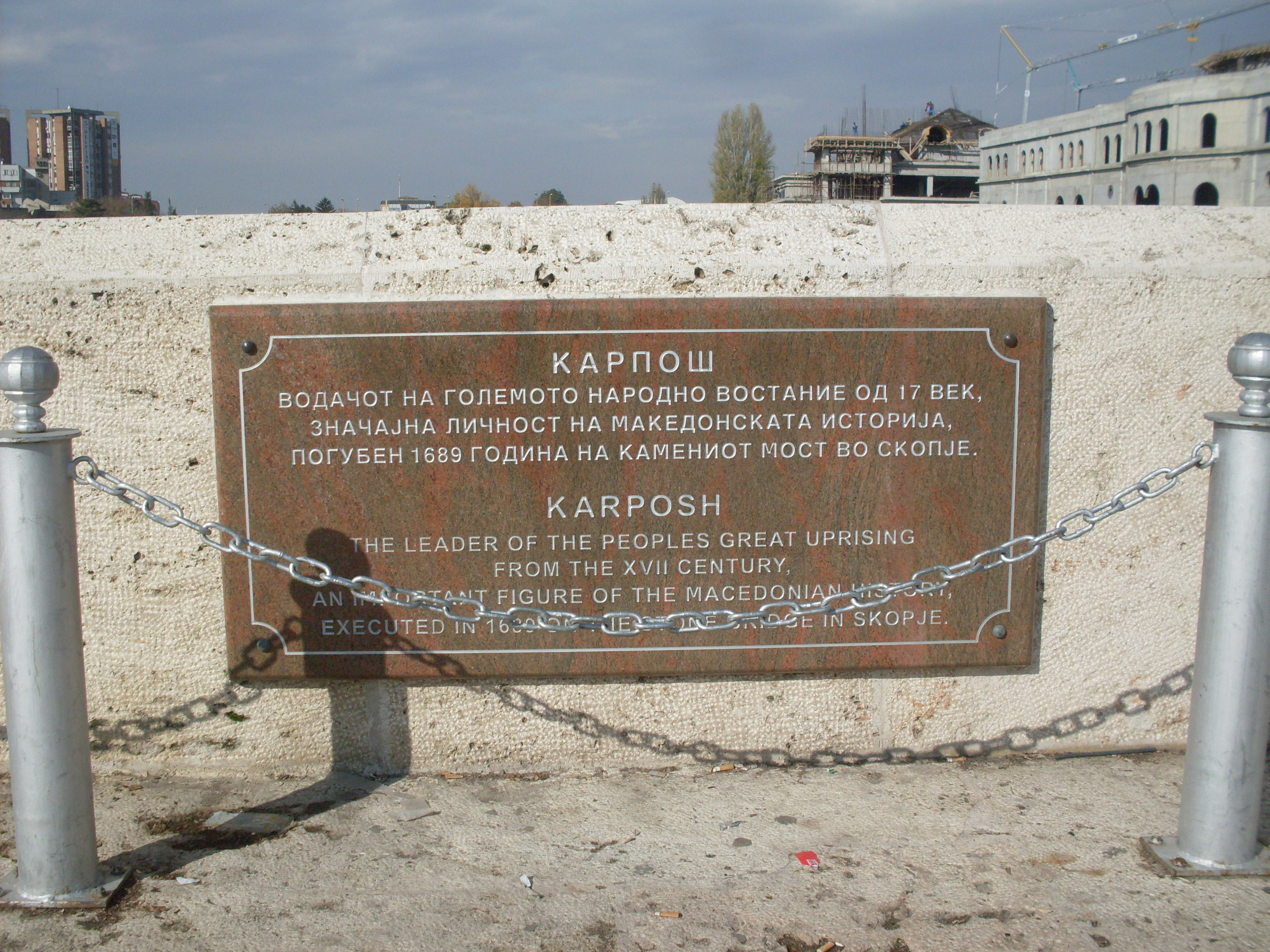
Commemoration plaque at Skopje dedicated to Karposh's Rebellion.

In 1689, Karposh, a brigand commander in the region of Dospat (present-day Bulgaria), who served as an Ottoman Christian auxiliary force commander, took advantage of the weakening of the Ottomans and discontent that arose concerning higher Ottoman taxation policies, and organized a revolt while Austria staged an attack on the Ottomans. Karposh's Rebellion quickly spread, resulting in the liberation of Kratovo, Kriva Palanka, Kumanovo, Kaçanik and other towns. Then, together with the Austrian army led by Emperor Leopold I, the local Christian population fought to liberate Skopje and Štip. Later changes in the military and political situation in the Balkans had crucial downwards effect on the revolt. The Austrian army was forced to withdraw and the reinforced Ottomans attacked the rebels, taking Kriva Palanka, the rebel stronghold, and then attacked Kumanovo and its newly constructed fortress, where they captured Karposh and put him to death on the Stone Bridge across the Vardar.

Kumanovo became an urban settlement and administrative center of the region at the end of the 16th century or the beginning of the 17th century. Following the turbulent events (including the Karpoš Uprising in 1689) the city experienced a period of stagnation, and by the end of 18th century Kumanovo epitomized an Ottoman provincial town.

In an 1861 book Austrian diplomat Johann Georg von Hahn stated that the town had 650 dwellings, of which 300 were Muslim and 350 were Christian Bulgarian, in addition to 30 Gypsy in the outskirts, while the total population of the town was 3,500.

The Kumanovo Uprising, led by Serb district chiefs of Kumanovo and surrounding districts, was active from 20 January to 20 May 1878 (4 months). The chiefs swore oath in the local church and appealed to Prince Milan IV of Serbia to aid the uprising, and they pledged their devotion and loyalty, and union with Serbia. The rebels were finally defeated by brigadier-general Hafuz Pasha.

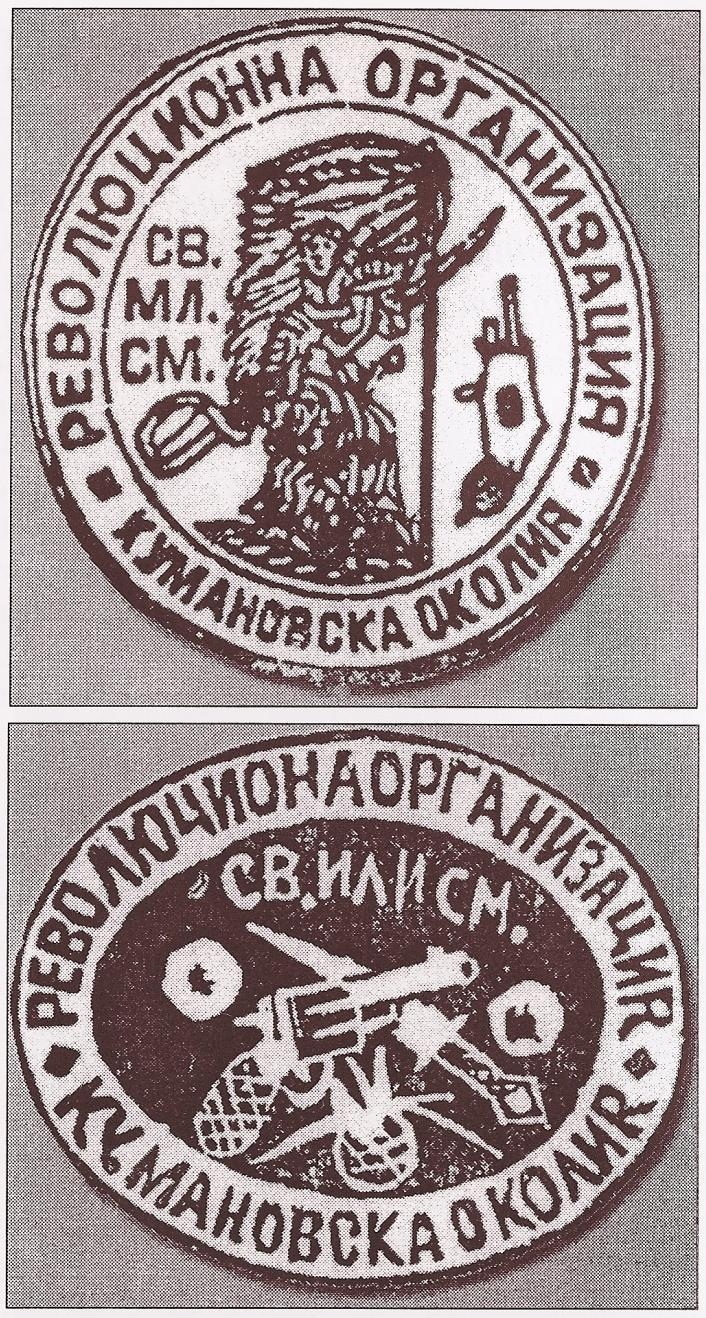
IMRO Kumanovo Seals

The Skopje Revolutionary district of the Internal Macedonian Revolutionary Organization (IMRO) decided in 1894 that it would organize a committee in Kumanovo, which was later established in the house of Jordan Jovčev, member of the local Bulgarian school board. The committee included also the chief Bulgarian teacher in the town Iliya Levkov, the secretary of the Bulgarian metropolitan deputy Traiche Mitev, priest Andon, his son and Bulgarian teacher Psaltir Popandontov, the merchant Zafir Tasev, elder of the Kumanovo Bulgarian community the Bulgarian teacher Zafir Shaklev and Angel Prekodolka. They organized the assassination of Serbian priest Atanasije Petrović.

=== First Balkan War ===
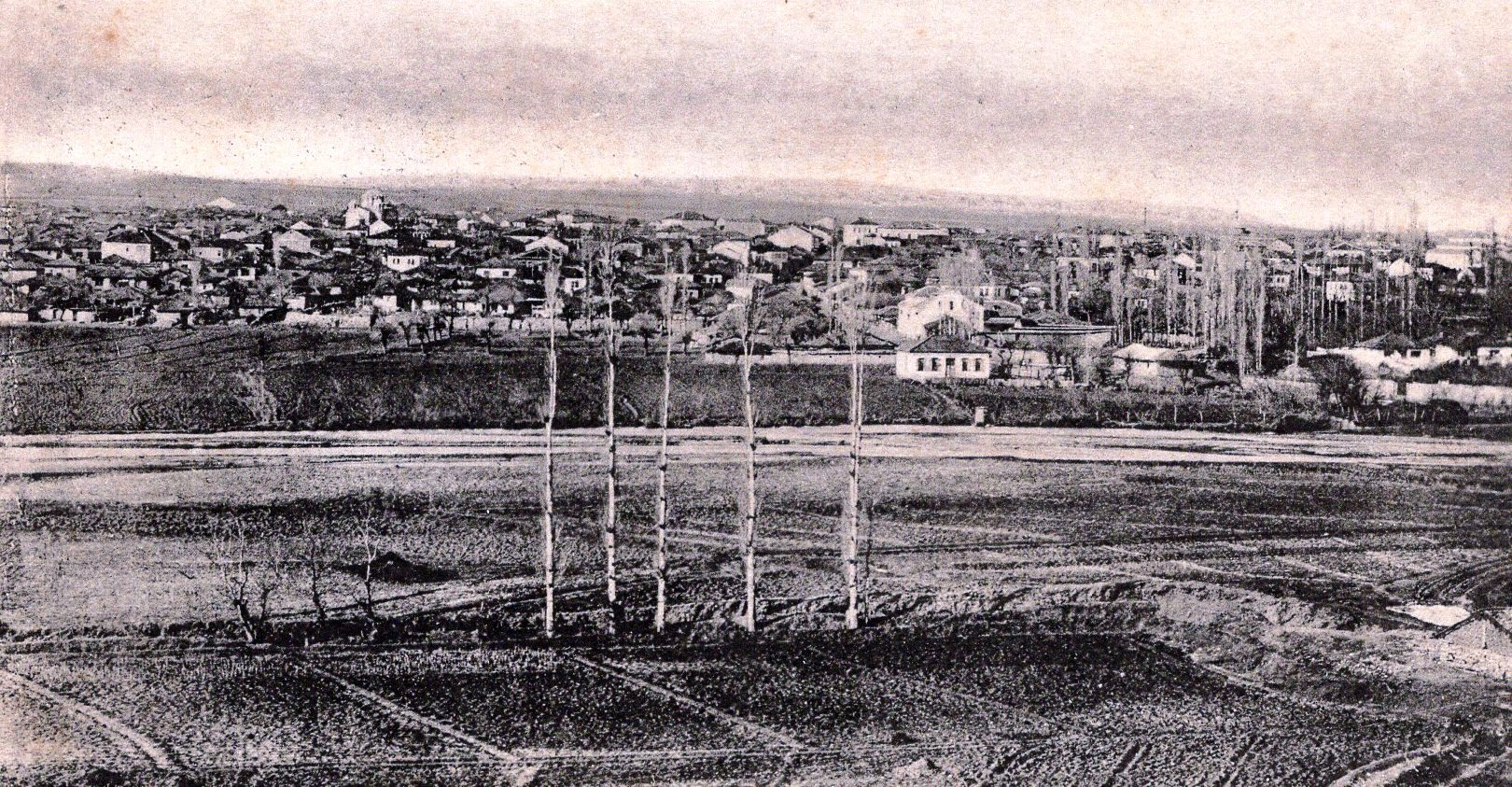
View of Kumanovo, c. 1913

In October 1912, during the First Balkan War, Serbian forces under the command of General Radomir Putnik won a decisive victory over the Ottomans north of the town. The two-day Battle of Kumanovo ended Ottoman authority in Vardar Macedonia and contributed for region's integration into Serbia, and consequently, into Yugoslavia. The entire region of Macedonia was split in three among Serbia, Greece and Bulgaria after the Treaty of Bucharest in 1913.

=== World War II ===
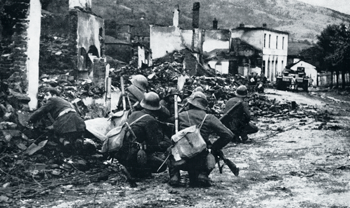
Bulgarian soldiers in the battle for Kumanovo (10 November 1944)

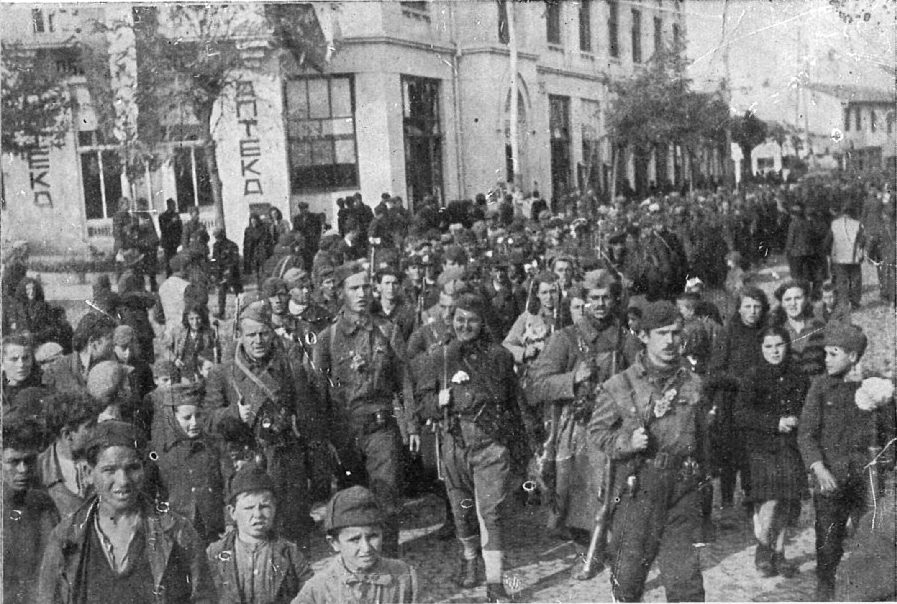
Partisans marching through liberated Kumanovo (11 November 1944)

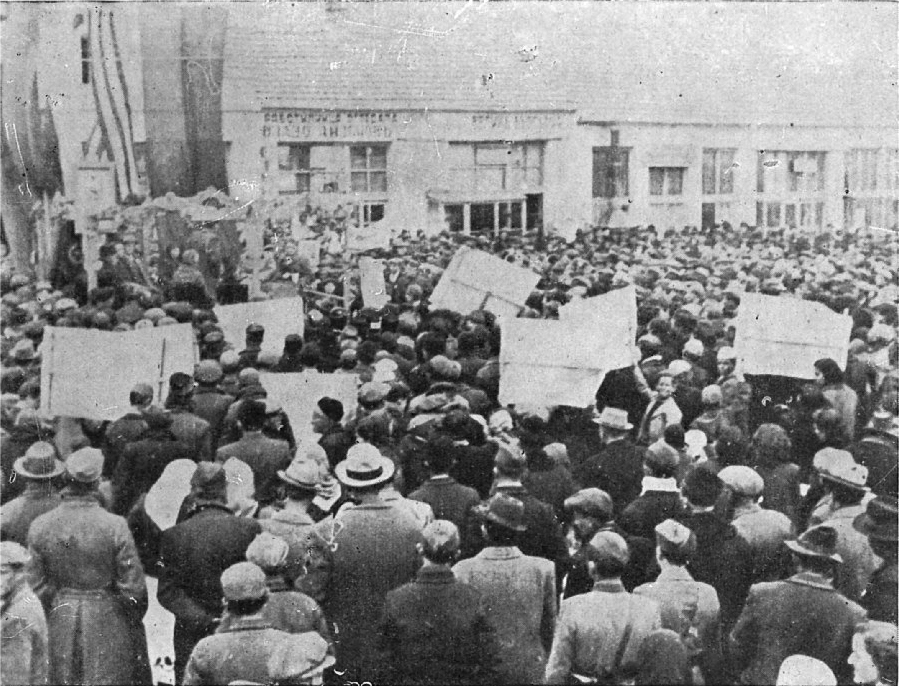
Crowd celebrating the liberation (November 1944)

The communist resistance in Kumanovo and Prilep began on 11 October 1941. The struggle ended with victory and formation of the Macedonian socialist federated state within the Yugoslav Federation (SFRY). One of the famous partisans from Kumanovo was Hristijan Todorovski Karpoš. After 1945 Kumanovo experienced fast economic, administrative and cultural development.

=== Modern history ===
It developed economically in the late 19th century (agriculture, handcrafts and trade). Still, industrial development occurred only at the end of the Second World War. The rapid economic, administrative and cultural expansion of Kumanovo began in 1945. Today, it is a modern city with approximately 100,000 inhabitants. It was also the site of the 9 June 1999 Agreement signed between FR Yugoslav Generals and the NATO Generals about bringing in a NATO peacekeeping contingent in Kosovo called, the Kosovo Force, or KFOR (Kumanovo Agreement).

=== 2001 Albanian insurgency and Inter-community relations ===
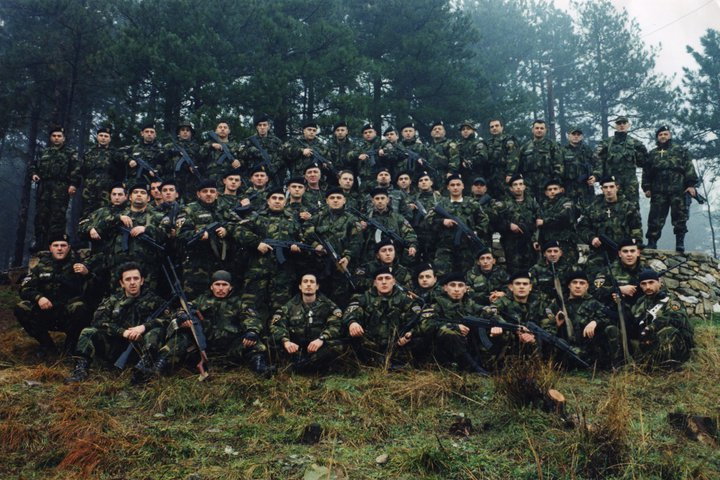
Macedonian Armed forces in July 2001 near Kumanovo

The Albanian insurgency in Macedonia first started in the mountains outskirts of Tetovo and then spread in May 2001 to the region of Kumanovo mostly to the north. The armed conflict in Kumanovo mainly resulted in a division of the educational system along ethnic lines. All the Albanian-language students left the schools and demanded new schools to be opened. Following this process there is a visible separation in the town affecting the inter-community relations.

==== 2015 clashes ====
A group claiming to be the National Liberation Army had claimed responsibility for a grenade attack on Kumanovo's police station in December 2014. During a police raid on 9 May 2015, a shootout erupted between Macedonian police forces and an armed group. Eight Macedonian policemen and 10 ethnic Albanians were killed, while 37 officers were wounded and hospitalized. The attack ended on 10 May 2015 in an operation by the police. Thirty men were arrested and charged with terrorism by Macedonian authorities.

== Economy ==
Agriculture and trade developed mainly in the 19th century. After the Second World War the town's metal-processing, tobacco, agriculture, footwear and textile industries have made it an economic, trading and cultural center during the time of SFR Yugoslavia.

== Infrastructure ==
=== Railway ===
A railway connection exists between Skopje with Serbia via Kumanovo. In 2013, rehabilitation of the railway section between Kumanovo and the village of Beljakovce will commence, which is part of the Railway Corridor VIII that will connect North Macedonia with Sofia, Bulgaria and the Black Sea to the East and Tirana, Albania and the Adriatic Sea to the West.

=== Roads ===
License plate of Kumanovo

A 40 kilometre (25 miles) highway exists between Skopje and Kumanovo, going near Kumanovo in the north and crossing the border with Serbia. On the section Kumanovo-Miladinovci there is a Pay tool.

Section of the Pan-European Corridor X was put into use in 2010 connecting Kumanovo to the border crossing Tabanovce. The 7.6 kilometres (4.7 miles) highway was built for 4 years and at a cost of 15.5 million Euros.

Another important road goes from Kumanovo to Kriva Palanka and then to the border with Bulgaria.

=== Air Travel ===
Skopje International Airport is 20 km (12 mi) south of Kumanovo.

The E-75 motorway is accessible from Kumanovo.

Sofia Airport is 190 km (118 mi) from the city and Thessaloniki International Airport is 240 km (149 mi).

Near Kumanovo is Adzi Tepe Airport which is without a paved runway.

== Culture ==
=== Monuments and Landmarks ===
Kumanovo has several prehistoric monuments dating back to the prehistoric period, including:

- Gradište, an archaeological site from the Bronze Age near the village of Pelince
- Near the village of Mlado Nagoričane is another interesting site dating from the period of Neolith.
- Near the village of Lopate is the Drezga place that represents a Roman necropolis.
- One of the most important sites located near the Kumanovo is the 4,000-year-old megalithic astronomical observatory of Kokino, located 30 km (19 mi) northeast of Kumanovo and discovered in 2001. It is ranked fourth on the list of old observatories by NASA.
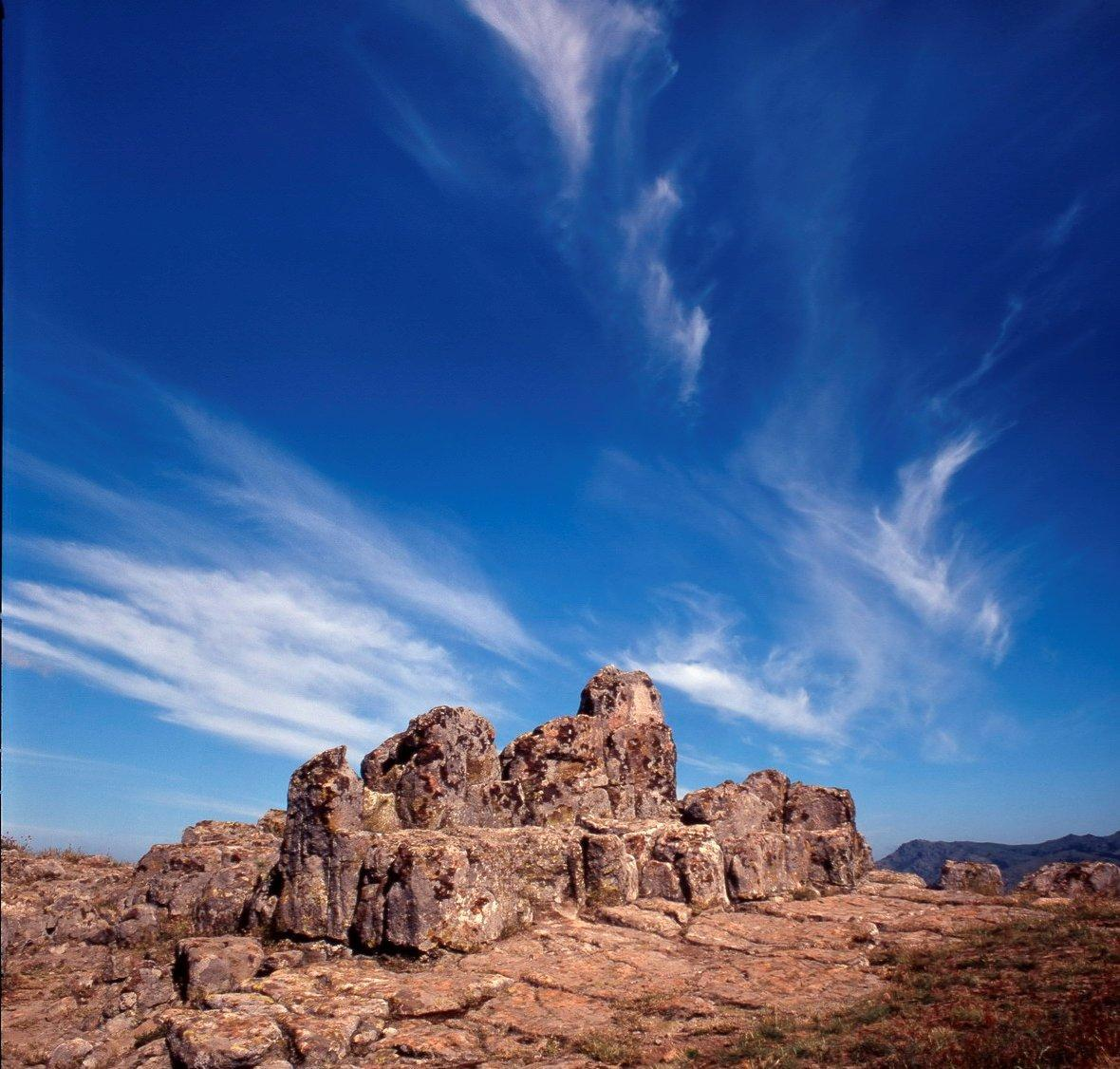
  Megalithic Observatory Kokino
- Sculpture of Batko Gjorgjija in the city center
- Monument Four Poles also located in the center of the city on the main square,
- Memorial Ossuary and
- House Museum of Hristijan Todorovski Karpoš.

The oldest and biggest church in the town is the St. Nicholas. There are icons from the 13th century in the church. The church represents a masterwork of Andreja Damjanov, an important Macedonian renaissance architect.

- Church Holy Trinity built in 1902,
- Church of St. George,
- Church of St. Petka in the village of Mlado Nagoričane,
- the Karpino Monastery,
- the Ascension of Holy Mother in the village of Matejče,
- Eski Mosque built in 1532,
- Monument Zebrnjak,
- Kumanovska Banja in the village of Proevce and
- Sports Hall Sokolana.
- Chetiri Bandere Monument

Other landmarks are:

- statue of Woman Fighter
- Zanatski dom
- Kasapski Krug
- ASNOM memorial center in the village Pelince

=== Cultural organizations ===
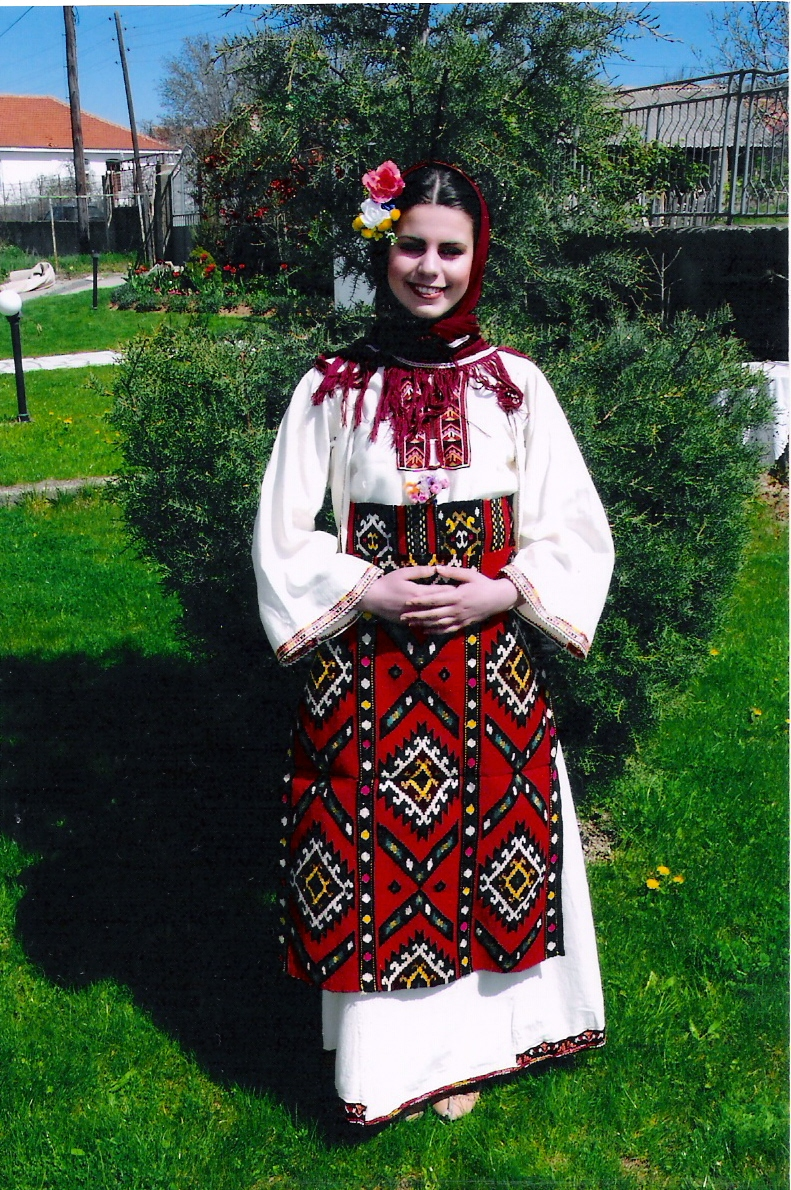
Kumanovo female folk dress

The oldest folklore assemble in North Macedonia, KUD "Panče Pešev" is placed in Kumanovo. This year the assemble is celebrating 80 years of existence.

Kumanovo has

- a library "Tane Georgievski Library"
- Cultural center Trajko Prokopiev
- Museum
- Theatre.

Several painting colonies and exhibitions take place every year in Kumanovo or in nearby villages.

Kumanovo is distinguished by its jazz festival which features bands from all over the world. In 2002 the Macedonian bands Foltin and Dragan Dautovski Quartet performed, and in 2003 Macedonian jazz pianist Simon Kiselicki performed in his 'Beneventan Trio'. Every year Kumanovo has a "Days of Comedy" festival, sponsored by the Macedonian Ministry of Culture, featuring comedies from several Macedonian theatres and also from neighbouring Serbia and Bulgaria. Kumanovo municipality was organizing the manifestation "City of Culture 2006".

== Demographics ==
=== Historical ===
Table below showing historic demographic development according to Yugoslav and Macedonian census data:

City of Kumanovo population according to ethnic group 1948-2021
Ethnic group	census 1948		census 1953		census 1961		census 1971		census 1981		census 1994		census 2002		census 2021	
Ethnic group	Number	%	Number	%	Number	%	Number	%	Number	%	Number	%	Number	%	Number	%
Macedonians	..	..	14,351	61.5	20,323	66.1	28,789	62.1	36,812	60.5	40,634	62.3	42,840	60.5	43,280	57.7
Albanians	..	..	951	4.1	1,893	6.2	7,827	16.9	12,997	21.4	15,612	23.9	18,277	25.8	17,685	23.6
Serbs	..	..	1,790	7.7	2,808	9.1	3,759	8.1	4,252	7.0	5,097	7.8	4,727	6.7	4,300	5.7
Roma	..	..	1,861	8.0	..	..	3,013	6.5	4,415	7.3	2,987	4.6	4,042	5.7	2,768	3.7
Turks	..	..	3,858	16.5	2,512	8.2	1,791	3.9	936	1.5	241	0.4	256	0.4	125	0.2
Vlachs	..	..	12	0.1	..	..	..	..	44	0.1	85	0.1	108	0.2	88	0.1
Bosniaks	..	..	0	0.0	0	0.0	0	0.0	0	0.0	0	0.0	14	0.0	32	0.0
Others	..	..	516	2.2	3,226	10.5	1,184	2.6	1,386	2.3	577	0.9	578	0.8	645	0.9
Persons for whom data are taken from administrative sources															6,128	8.2
Total	20,242		23,339		30,762		46,363		60,842		65,233		70,842		75,051	

=== Present-day ===
The population of the city of Kumanovo according to the 2002 census numbers 77,561, the majority of which are ethnic Macedonians 62.4% (48,416), with a significant minority of ethnic Albanians 23.7% (18,369) and ethnic Serbs 7.4% (5,746).

The most common mother tongues in the city were the following:

- Macedonian, 45,306 (64.0%)
- Albanian, 18,283 (25.8%)
- Romani, 4,007 (5.7%)
- Serbian, 2,399 (3.4%)
- Turkish, 215 (0.3%)
- others, 632 (0.9%)

The religious composition of the city was the following:

- Eastern Orthodox Christians, 46,766 (66.0%)
- Muslims, 22,483 (31.7%)
- others, 1,593 (2.3%)

== Sport ==
KF Bashkimi 1947 play in the highest Macedonian division; Bashkimi won the 2004–05 Macedonian Football Cup. FK Kumanovo is another team from the city. Milano plays its games at Milano Arena. KF Goblen has played in the Macedonian Second Football League and FK Karpoš 93 in the OFS Kumanovo First Division.

Macedonian National Football Team played friendly match with Egypt in Kumanovo on 29 September 1998. The game took place at Gradski Stadium Kumanovo and the scorers for Macedonian team were Srgjan Zaharievski and Dževdet Šainovski. The match ended 2:2.

RK Kumanovo is the handball club that currently competes in the Macedonian Handball Super League. They won the first ever Macedonian Handball Cup back in 1992–93.

Also, Kumanovo is recognized as a box school center, with few names emerged as famous in the 20th century, with Ace Rusevski and Redžep Redžepovski as a leading names.

== Media ==
=== Telecommunication operators ===
- A1 Macedonia (América Móvil)
- Green Mobile
- IP Systems
- K-Net
- Lycamobile
- Makedonski Telekom (Deutsche Telekom)
- Mtel (Telekom Srbija)
- Multimedia Net
- Telekabel
- Total TV (SBB)

=== TV Stations ===
- TV Plus (in Macedonian)
- Festa (in Albanian)
- Hana (in Albanian) (Closed)
- Nova (in Macedonian) (Closed)
- KTL (in Macedonian) (Closed)
- RTK (in Macedonian) (Closed)
- K3, Regional, HQ in Kumanovo, (in Macedonian) (Closed)
- KRT (in Macedonian) (Closed)

=== Radio stations ===
- Radio Bum (in Macedonian)
- Radio Bravo (in Macedonian)
- Jehona 103.5 FM (in Albanian)
- City FM (in Macedonian) (Closed)

=== Newspapers ===
- Ploshtad newspaper (closed)
- Nash Vesnik (closed)
- Dedo Ivan (closed)
- Oktobris (closed)

== Gallery ==
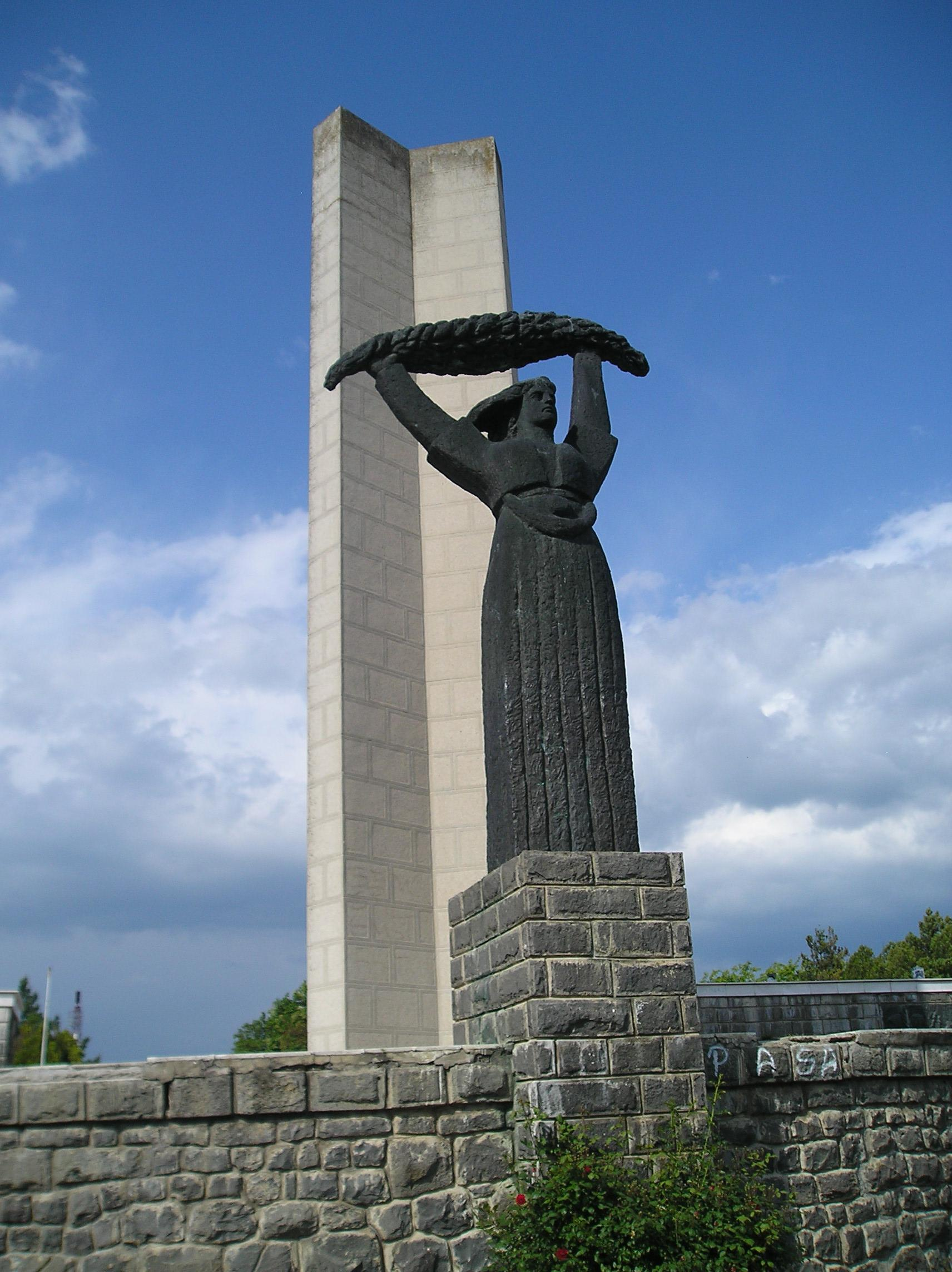
Monument of the Revolution

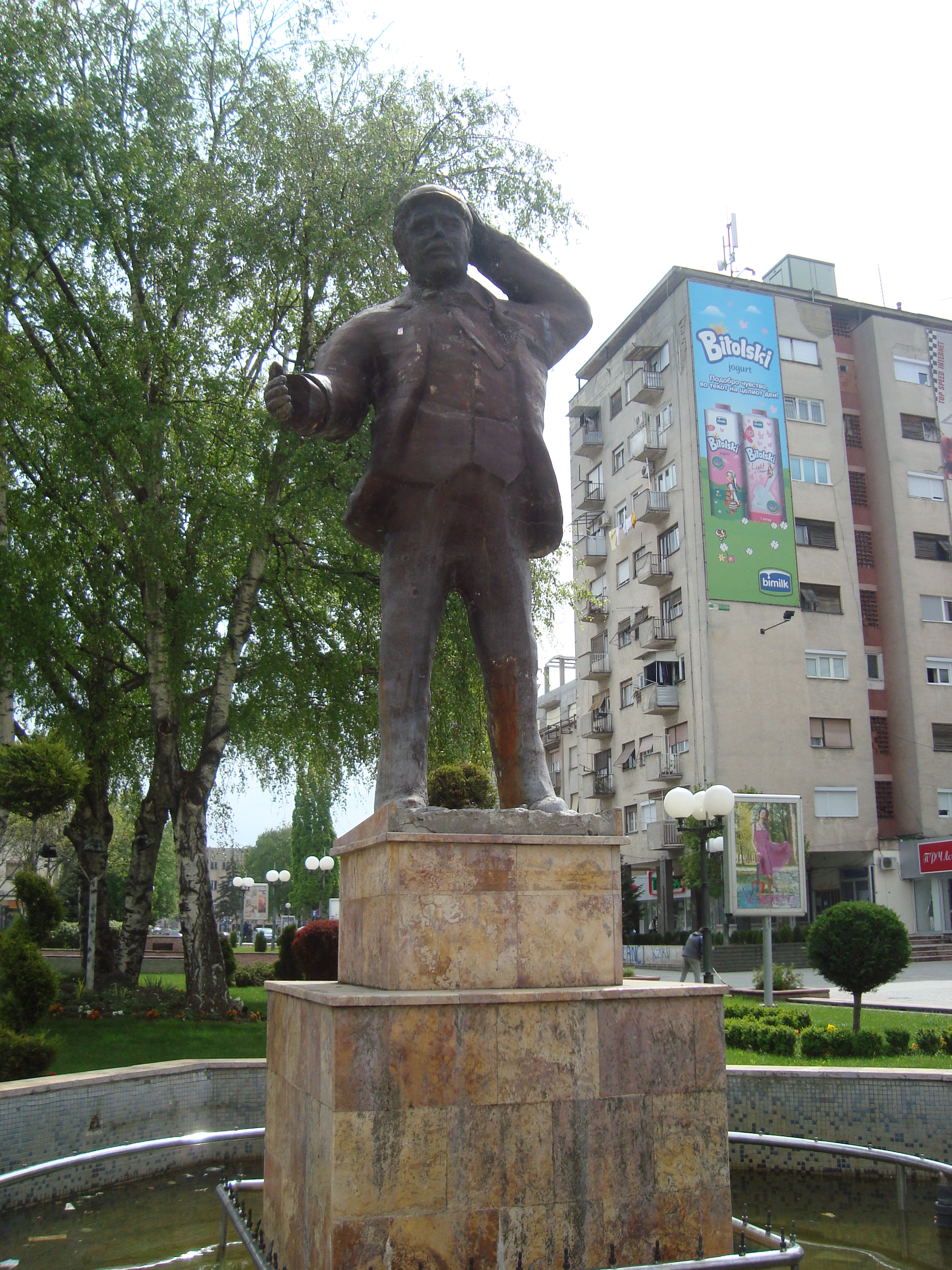
Batko Gjorgjija monument in the square of Kumanovo

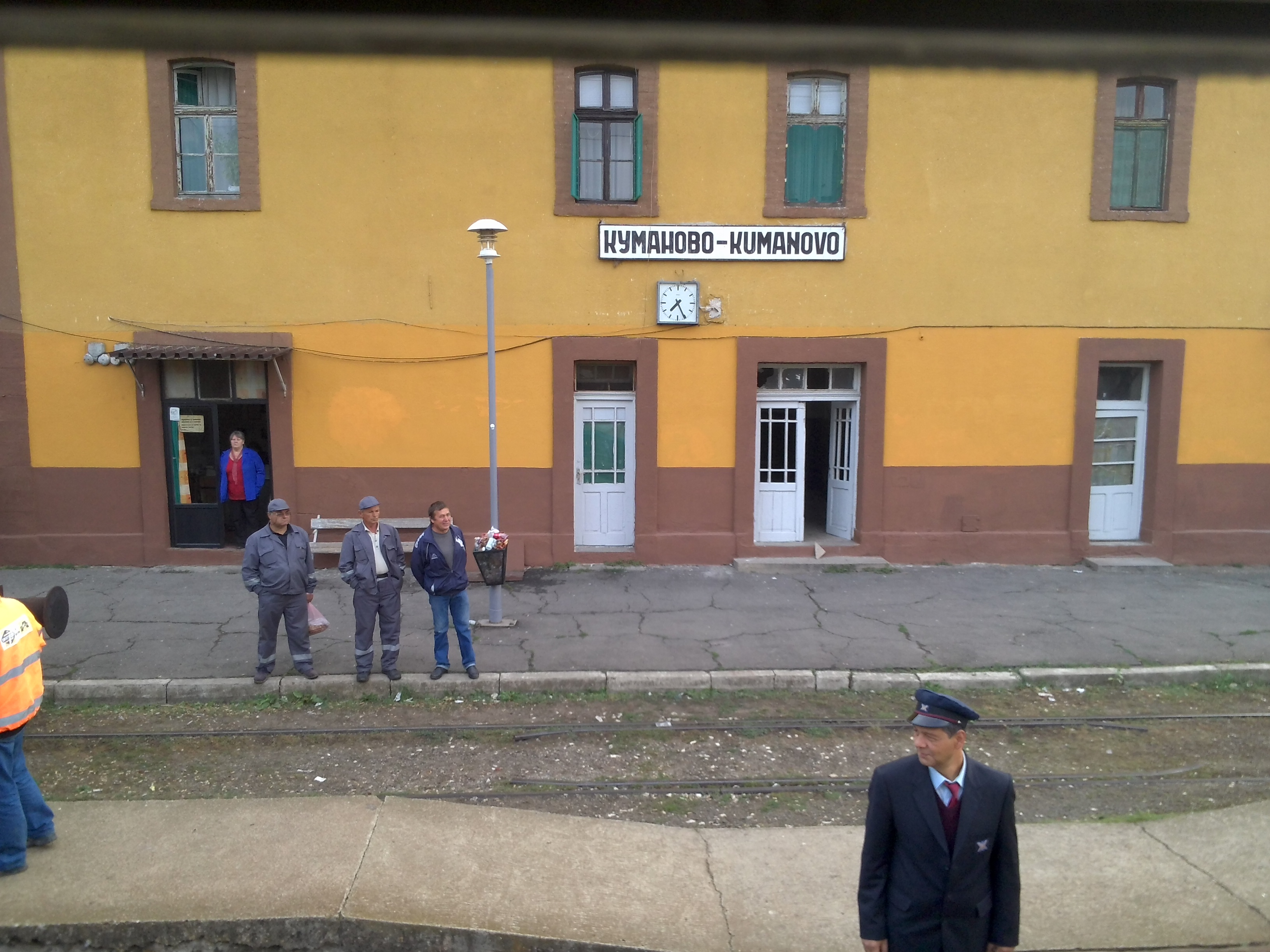
Kumanovo railway station

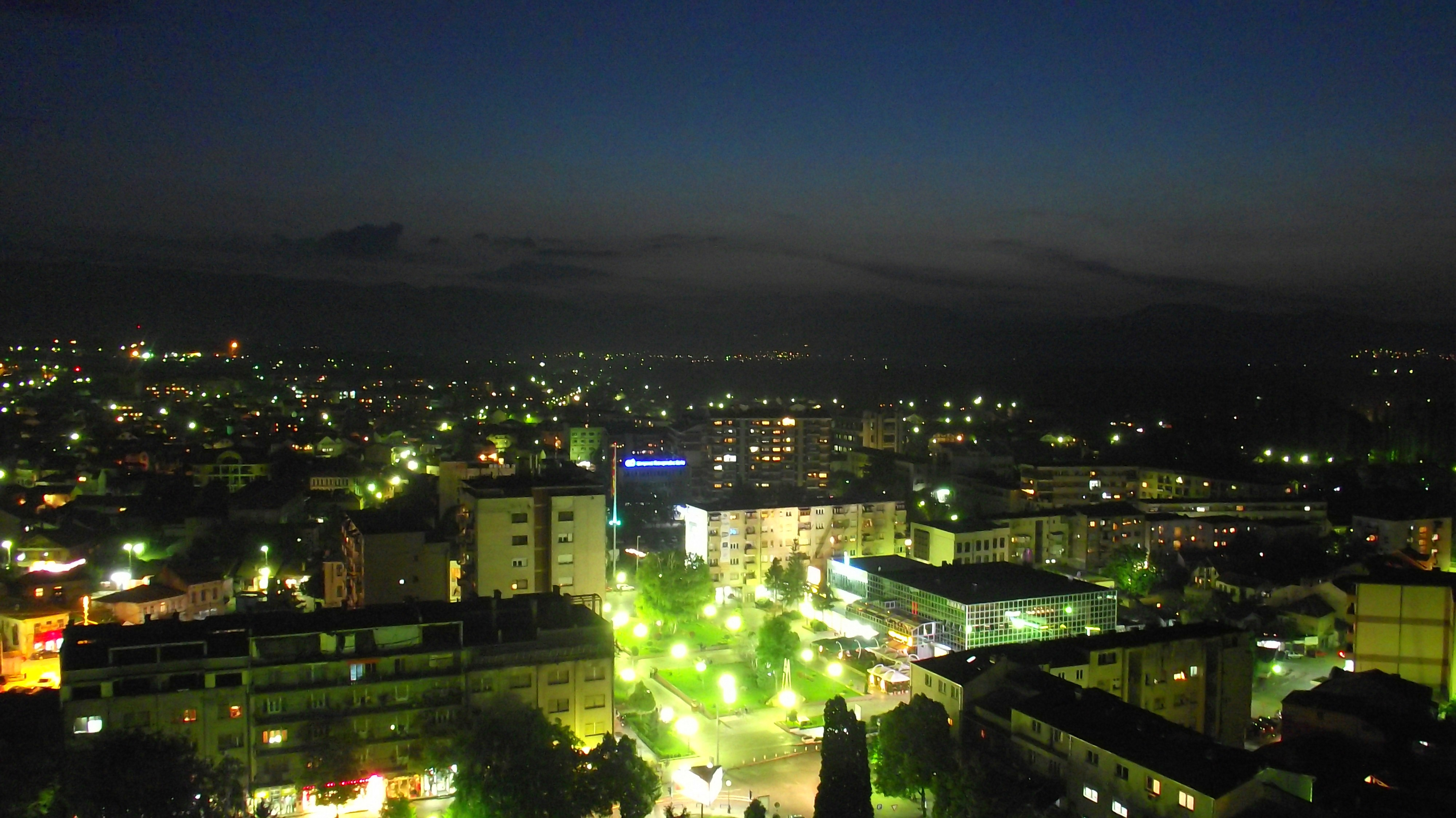
Kumanovo at night

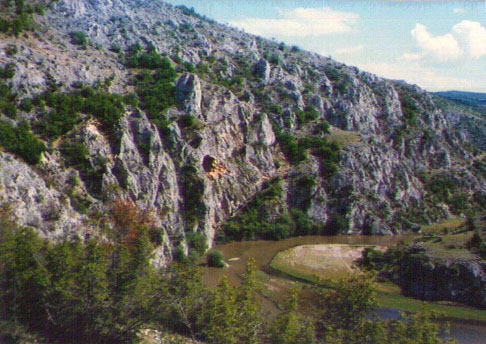
Bislim near Kumanovo

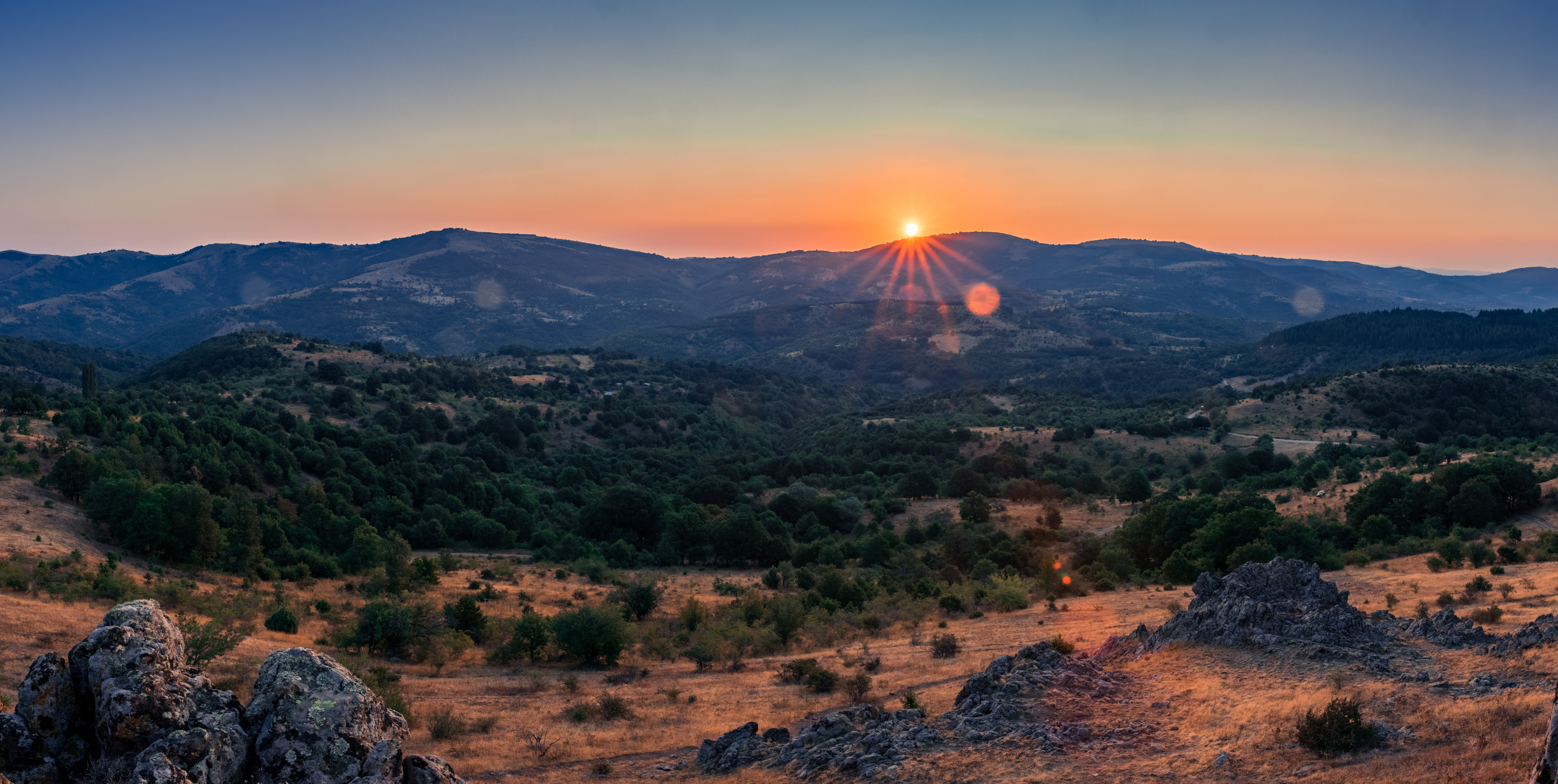
Kokino view

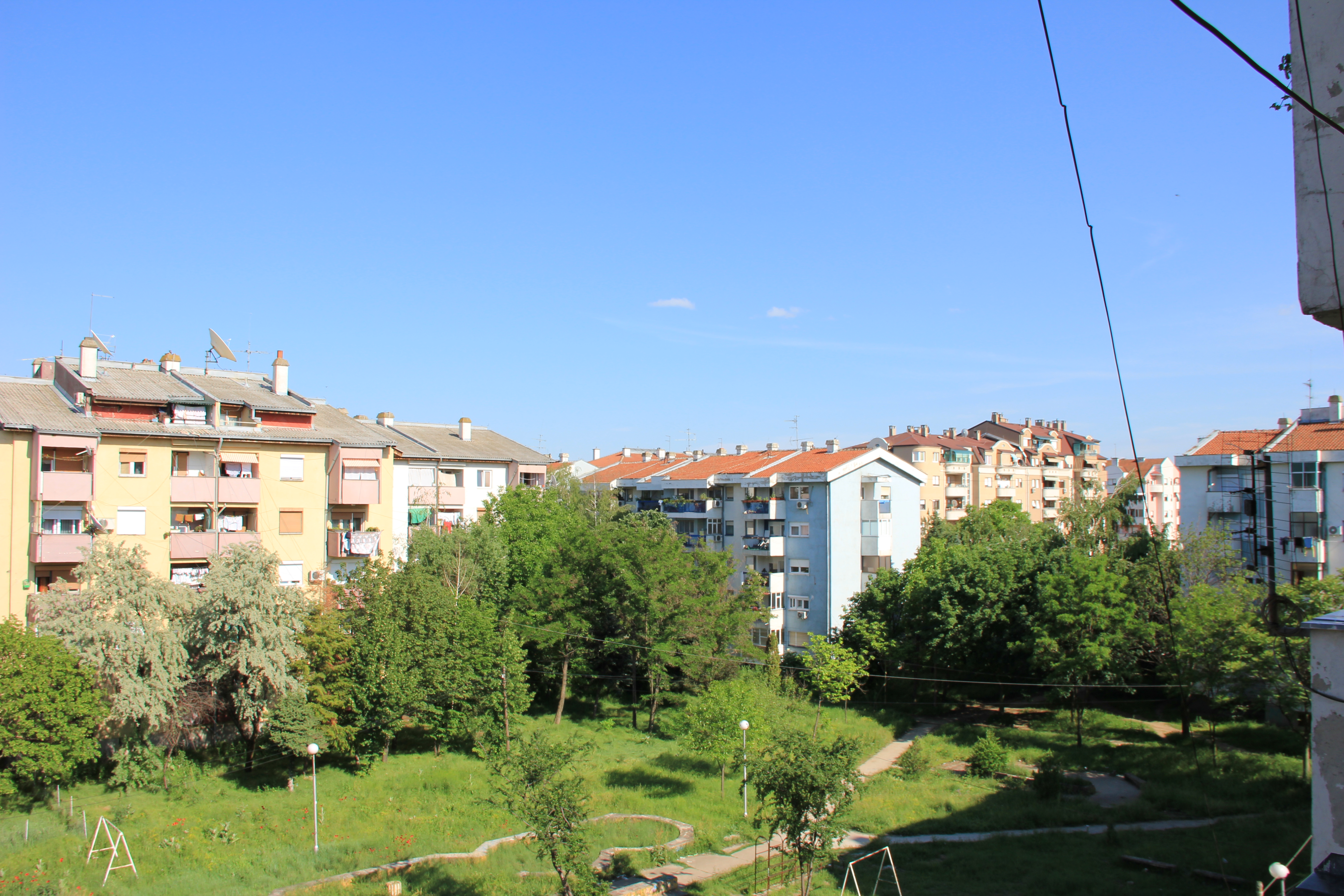
Collective residential area in Kumanovo

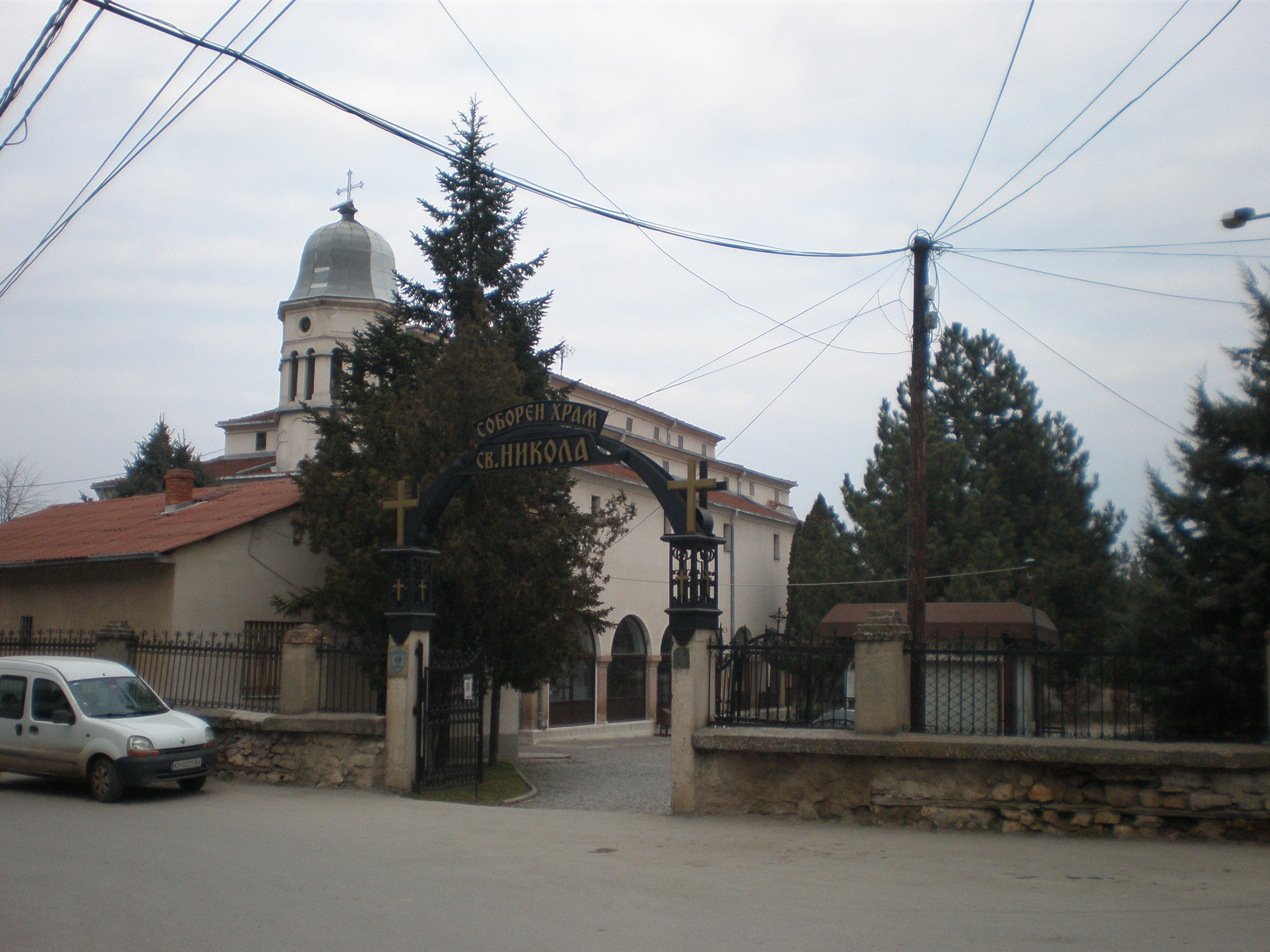
St. Nikola, main church in Kumanovo

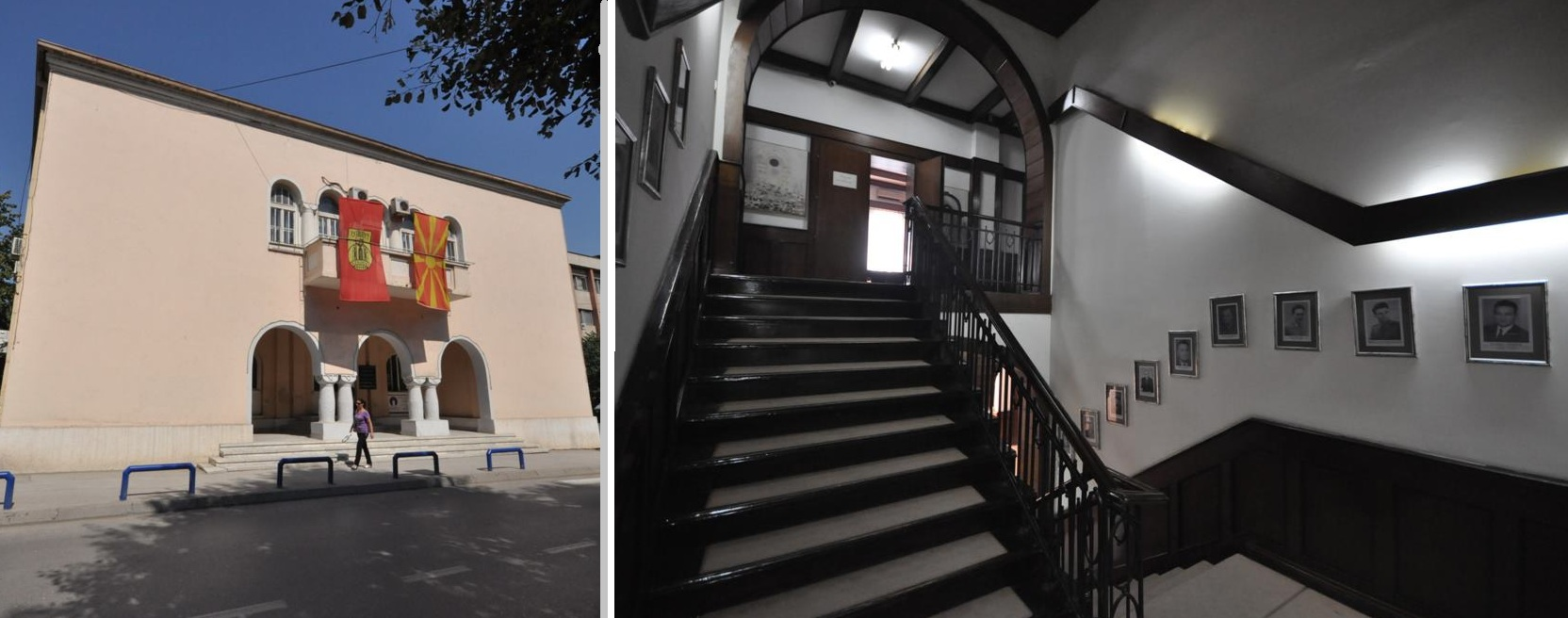
The Municipal Building in Kumanovo (built as an Ottoman police station)

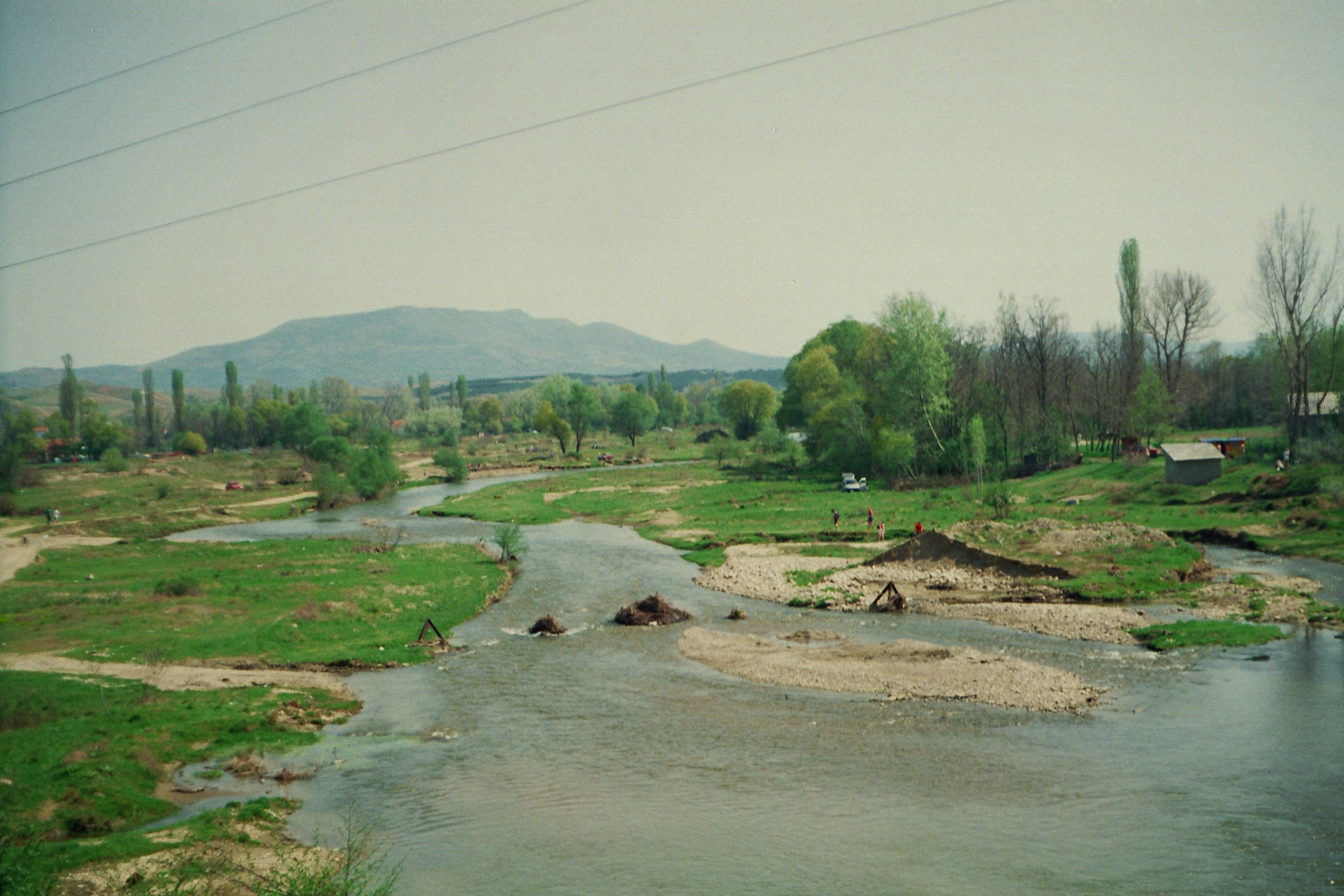
River Pchinja near v.Vojnik

== Diplomatic missions ==
Romania Honorary Consulate

== Twin towns – sister cities ==
Kumanovo is twinned with:

- Banja Luka, Bosnia and Herzegovina
- Bijeljina, Bosnia and Herzegovina
- Câmpina, Romania
- Çorlu, Turkey
- Čukarica (Belgrade), Serbia
- Gabrovo, Bulgaria
- Gjilan, Kosovo
- Gornji Milanovac, Serbia
- Leskovac, Serbia
- Nikšić, Montenegro
- Novi Sad, Serbia
- Pančevo, Serbia
- Plovdiv, Bulgaria
- Vranje, Serbia

== See also ==
- List of mayors of Kumanovo
- Kumanovo dialect
- Kumanovo Municipality
- Buildings and Structures in Kumanovo
- Coat of arms of Kumanovo
- Kumani
- Kumanovo Prison
- Timeline of Kumanovo
- Diocese of Kumanovo and Osogovo
- Muftiship of Kumanovo
