= List of people from Kumanovo =

Below is a list of notable people born in Kumanovo, North Macedonia, or its surroundings.

== Sports ==
- Naser Aliji (born 1993), football player
- Armend Alimi (born 1987), football player
- Saša Ćirić (born 1968), former football striker
- Stole Dimitrievski (born 1993), football goalkeeper
- Marko Dujković (born 1990), basketball player
- Nikola Karakolev (born 1987), basketball player
- Stefan Kimevski (born 1990), handball player
- Mensur Kurtisi (born 1986), football player
- Vlade Lazarevski (born 1983), football player
- Kristijan Manević (born 1987), basketball player
- Igor Mihajlovski (born 1973), former basketball player
- Nataša Mladenovska (born 1986), handball player
- Orhan Mustafi (born 1990), football striker
- Boban Nikolovski (born 1977), football player
- Redžep Redžepovski (born 1962), former boxer
- Ace Rusevski (born 1956), former boxer
- Taulant Seferi (born 1996), football player
- Vujadin Stanojković (born 1962), football coach

== Politics ==
- Dragan Bogdanovski (1929–1998), émigré, activist and one of the founders of VMRO-DPMNE
- Jezdimir Bogdanski (1930–2007), president of SR Macedonia (1988–1990)
- Boris Chushkarov (1916–1982), first director of OZNA for SR Macedonia
- Zoran Damjanovski (born 1956), former mayor of Kumanovo
- Maksim Dimitrievski (born 1975), politician and mayor of Kumanovo
- Teodosiy Dzhartov, mayor
- Ilir Hasani (born 1977), politician and member of Assembly of Macedonia
- Tode Ilich (1943–2014), mayor of Kumanovo (1984–1986)
- Blage Kiprijanovski (born 1948), mayor of Kumanovo (1993–1996)
- Slobodan Kovachevski, mayor of Kumanovo (2000–2005)
- Trajko Loparski, former mayor of Kumanovo
- Stanko Mladenovski (1937–), politician; speaker of the People's Assembly
- Mara Naceva, (1920–2013), Macedonian communist, participant in the World War II in Yugoslavia and a national hero
- Filip Petrovski (born 1972), politician, member of Assembly of Macedonia, civil right activist, director of the National Archives of Macedonia.
- Boris Protikj (1941–2002), mayor of Kumanovo (1996–2000)
- Saltir Putinski, mayor of Kumanovo (1951–1961)
- Oliver Spasovski (born 1976), minister of interior of Macedonia (2015–2016)
- Mirvan Xhemaili (born 1974), politician and member of Assembly of Macedonia

== Arts ==
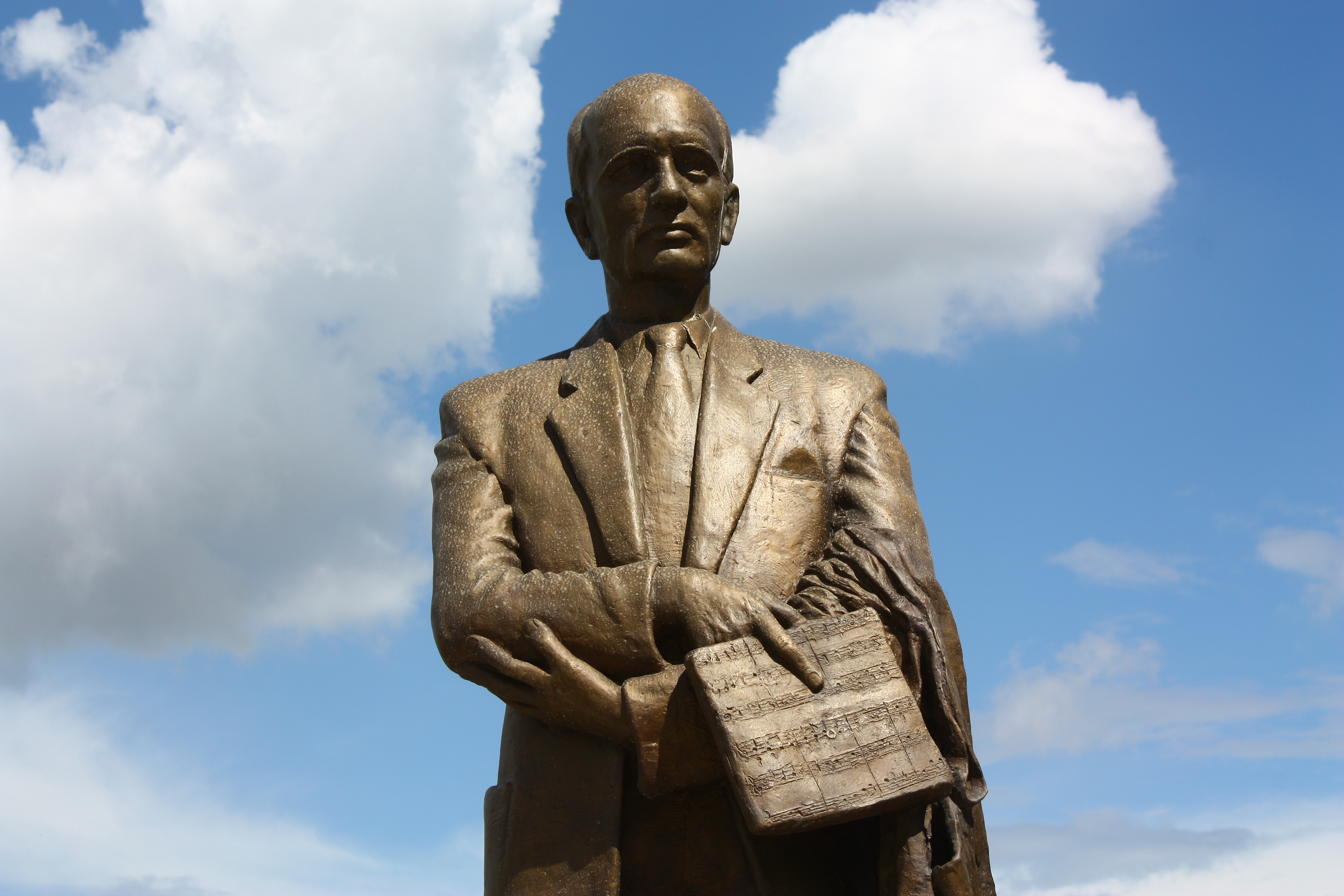
Trajko Prokopiev

- Venko Andonovski (born 1964), writer
- Vladimir Antonov
- Bodan Arsovski (born 1956), rock band member
- Ivan Babanovski (born 1941), intelligence officer and writer
- Bardhi, rapper, singer
- Vanja Bulić (born 1947), journalist and TV presenter
- Jordan Cekov (1921–2019), partisan, journalist, writer
- Slavko Dimevski (1920–1994), writer
- Danilo Kocevski (born 1947), writer
- Toni Mihajlovski (born 1967), actor
- Trajko Prokopiev (1909–1979) writer
- Arif Şentürk (born 1941), folk singer and compiler

== Military ==
- Velika Begovica (fl. 1876–78), rebel leader
- Jovan Dovezenski (1873–1935), commander (vojvoda)
- Goran Georgievski (1969–2005), member of Lions (fl. 2001–04)
- Ismet Jashari (1967–1998), commander of the Kosovo Liberation Army
- Hristijan Todorovski Karpoš (1921–1944), communist partisan during the Second World War
- Xhemail Rexhepi, commander of the National Liberation Army
- Pavle Mladenović, Čiča Pavle (–1905), commander (vojvoda)
- Boban Trajkovski (1973–2001 †), member of Wolves

== Religion ==
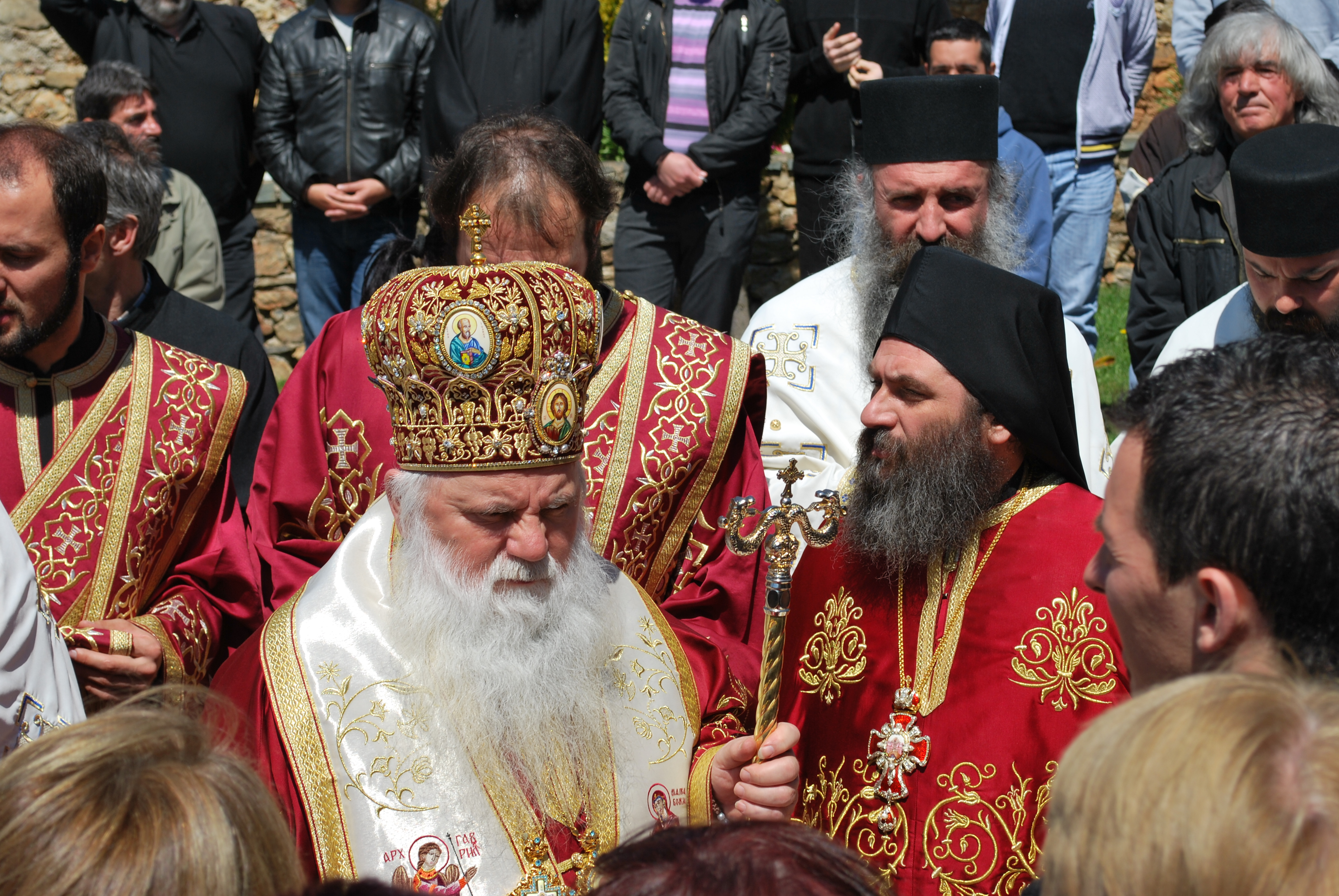
Timotej of Debar and Kichevo

- Hadži-Zaharija (1760–1830) metropolitan of Raška and Prizren (fl. 1819–30)
- Hilarion of Bregalica (1973–), current metropolitan of Diocese of Bregalnica (fl. 2006–present)
- Denko Krstić (1824–1882), influential merchant, born in Mlado Nagoričane
- Dimitrije Mladenović (1794–1890), Orthodox archpriest, born in Proevce (fl. 1833–90)
- Timotej of Debar and Kichevo (born 1951), current metropolitan of Diocese of Debar and Kuchevo (fl. 1995–present)

== Business ==
- Valentin Ilievski, general director of the Messer Group for BiH
- Denko Krstić

== Crime ==
- Nezim Allii, leader of Nezim gang (fl. 2004–2014)
- Bajrush Sejdiu, (born 1968), leader of Bajrush gang (fl. 1990–2008)
- Romeo Zhivikj, Roki, (1962–2004), crime boss (fl. 1980–2004)
