= Dimitrije Mladenović =

Dimitrije
- Churchwarden of the Metropolitan of Skopje for the Kumanovo kaza
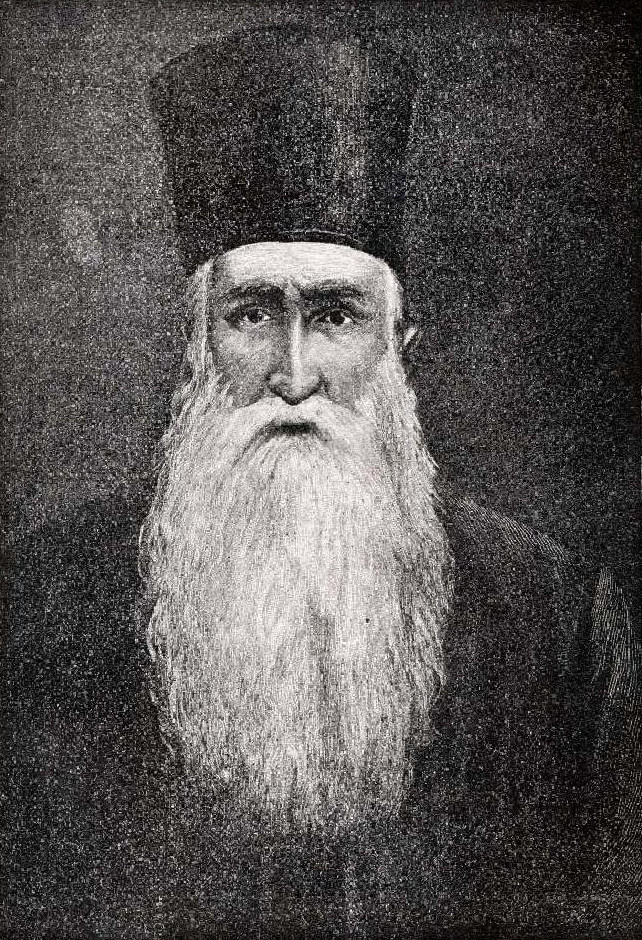
- Church: Ecumenical Patriarchate of Constantinople
- Province: Sanjak of Skopje
- Metropolis: Pajsije of Skopje
- Diocese: Skopje
- See: Constantinople
- Installed: 1833
- Term ended: 1890
- Predecessor: unknown
- Successor: unknown

Personal details
- Born: Dimitrije Mladenović; 1794 Proevce, Kumanovo kaza, Ottoman Empire (today North Macedonia)
- Died: 1890 (aged 95–96) Kumanovo, Ottoman Empire (today North Macedonia)
- Denomination: Eastern Orthodoxy
- Residence: Kumanovo
- Children: Kateriana
- Occupation: Churchwarden

Dimitrije Mladenović (Serbian Cyrillic: Димитрије Младеновић; 1794-1890) was an Ecumenical Patriarchate of Constantinople Protoiereus in the Kumanovo kaza (district) of the Ottoman Empire.

== Life ==
He was born in 1794 in the village of Proevce (now North Macedonia). He became a priest in 1818, then a protojerej (archpriest) in 1830, and finally an ikonom (churchwarden) of the Kumanovo district subordinate to the Metropolitan of Skopje (Patriarchate of Constantinople) in 1833. He was commonly known as the "Old Churchwarden" (Стари иконом).

In the period of 1847–51, the Church of St. Nicholas in Kumanovo was built by the ktitors: ikonom priest Dimitrije, Krsto Puto and his son Denko Krstić, priest Neša, Hadži-Stojilković, and the families of Rikačovci, Šapkalijanci, Borozani and Stojanćeajini.

He was taken down from the position of ikonom in 1855 but returned to the office a year later. In 1860 he and Denko Krstić were called to a hearing in Skopje by the Grand Vizier Mehmed Pasha Kibrizli, to be hanged, but paid for their release. Later in 1871 he was called by the vali in Prizren for questioning of his "immoral lifestyle", allegedly a campaign of the Bulgarian Exarchate, but he was released under a plea of the local population of Kumanovo to the Vali.

After the death of Dimitrije, Denko Krstić succeeded as the ikonom of Kumanovo. His daughter Katerina married Hadži-Vasilje from Vranje, from which marriage the acclaimed historian and ethnographer Jovan Hadži-Vasiljević sprung.

== See also ==
- List of people from Kumanovo

== Sources ==
- Hadži-Vasiljević, Jovan (1909). Južna stara Srbija: istorijska, etnografska i politička istraživanja, knjiga prva. Nova stamparija Davidović. (e-book)
- Hadži-Vasiljević, Jovan (1930). Скопље и његова околина: историска, етнографска и културно политичка излагања. Штампарија "Св. Сава".

Religious titles
Unknown	Ikonom of Ecumenical Patriarchate of Constantinople in Kumanovo (1833–1880)	Succeeded by Denko Krstić
