= Xhemaili =

Xhemaili is an Albanian surname. Notable people with the surname include:

- Blerim Xhemaili (born 1986), Albanian footballer
- Faton Xhemaili (born 1998), Serbian-born Albanian footballer
- Mirvan Xhemaili (born 1974), Macedonian politician
- Riola Xhemaili (born 2003), Swiss footballer

== See also ==
- Xhemajli
