= Hristijan Todorovski Karpoš =

- Христијан Тодоровски Карпош
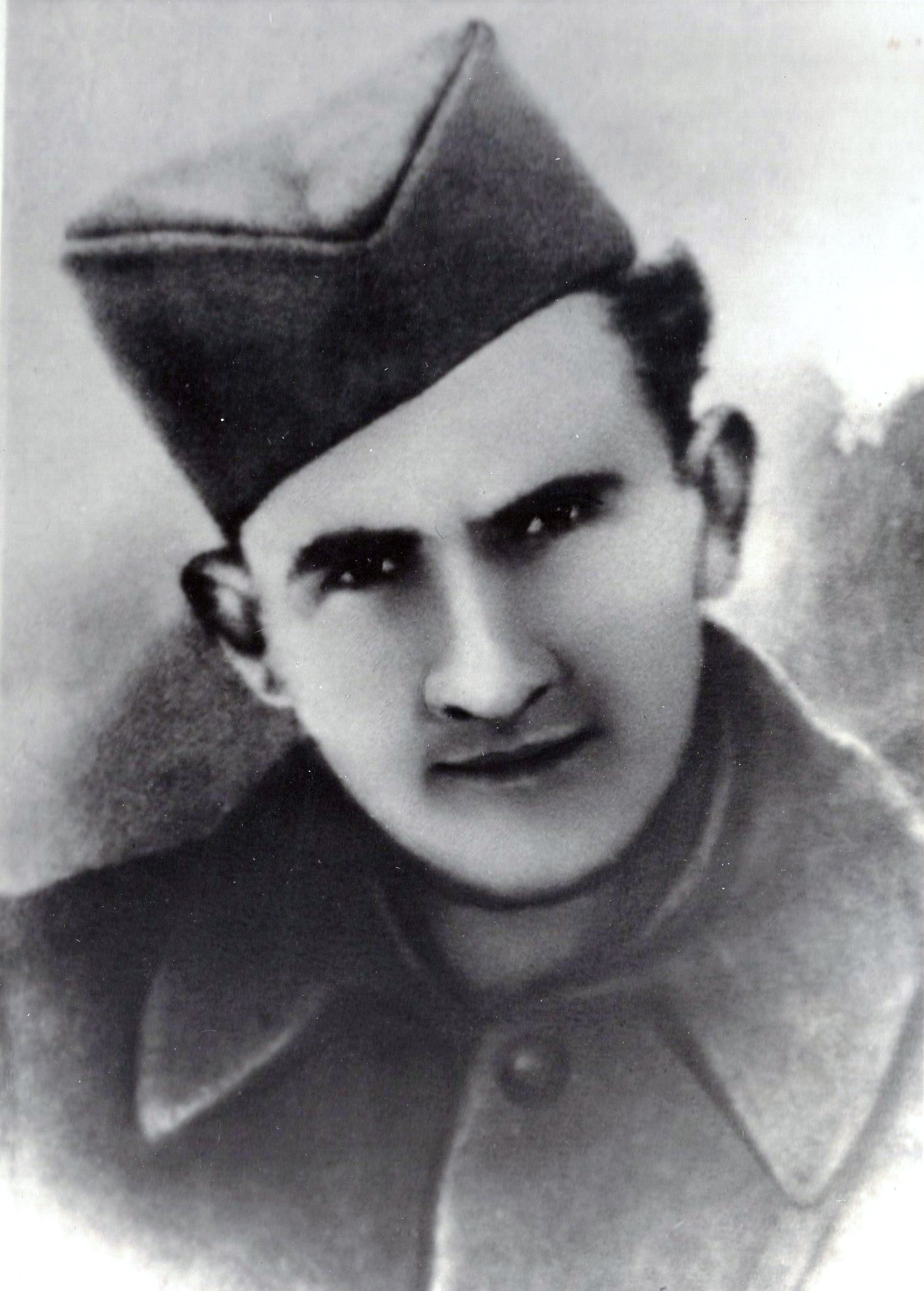
- Karposh during the war
- Born: 3 September 1921; Kumanovo, Kingdom of Yugoslavia
- Died: 7 February 1944 (aged 22); Biljača, Kingdom of Bulgaria (nowadays Serbia)
- Military career
- Allegiance: Yugoslavia
- Branch: PLA of Macedonia
- Service years: 1941-1944
- Rank: commander
- Units: Second south Moravian detachment Kukavian detachment
- Commands: "Jordan Nikolov" battalion

Hristijan Todorovski - Karpoš (3 September 1921 in Kumanovo – 7 February 1944 Biljača) was a Macedonian communist partisan during the Second World War.

== Biography ==
As a student he was accepted in the communist youth organization SKOJ. Because of his progressive ideas, he was expelled from secondary school in 1940 and was not allowed to enroll in any other school in Yugoslavia.

In 1941, he participated in the gathering of weapons and participated in the distribution of the illegal pamphlets and the bulletin "Dedo Ivan" which was published by the Kumanovo communist organization. He was a member of the First Kumanovo partisan detachment, and participated in the battle with the Bulgarian police on 11 October 1941. After that he became a member of the partisan headquarters for Kumanovo. Then he went to the Second south Moravian detachment, and late in the Kukavian detachment. In the second half of 1942, he was sent as a courier in Kumanovo, and he used his arrival to form a new detachment with whom he achieved successful actions.

From the end of 1943 he became the commander of the Kumanovo "Jordan Nikolov" battalion of the NOV of Macedonia and had several successful actions against the Vardar Chetnik Corps, especially in Pelince, near Kumanovo.

Hristijan Todorovski died on 7 February 1944 while leading a raid on the Bulgarian police station in Biljaca, near Preševo.

== Trivia ==
In 2009, marking 490 years of the first mention of the name Kumanovo and 65 years of the liberation of Kumanovo, the Municipality of Kumanovo organized a cultural and artistic program to honor the "five impressive people from Kumanovo in the 20th century". Todorovski Karpoš was one of the five, along with Vasil Iljoski, Trajko Prokopiev, Vladimir Antonov and Saltir Putinski. The plaque was received by Todorovski Karpos' grandson, Vladimir Todorovski.

== Gallery ==
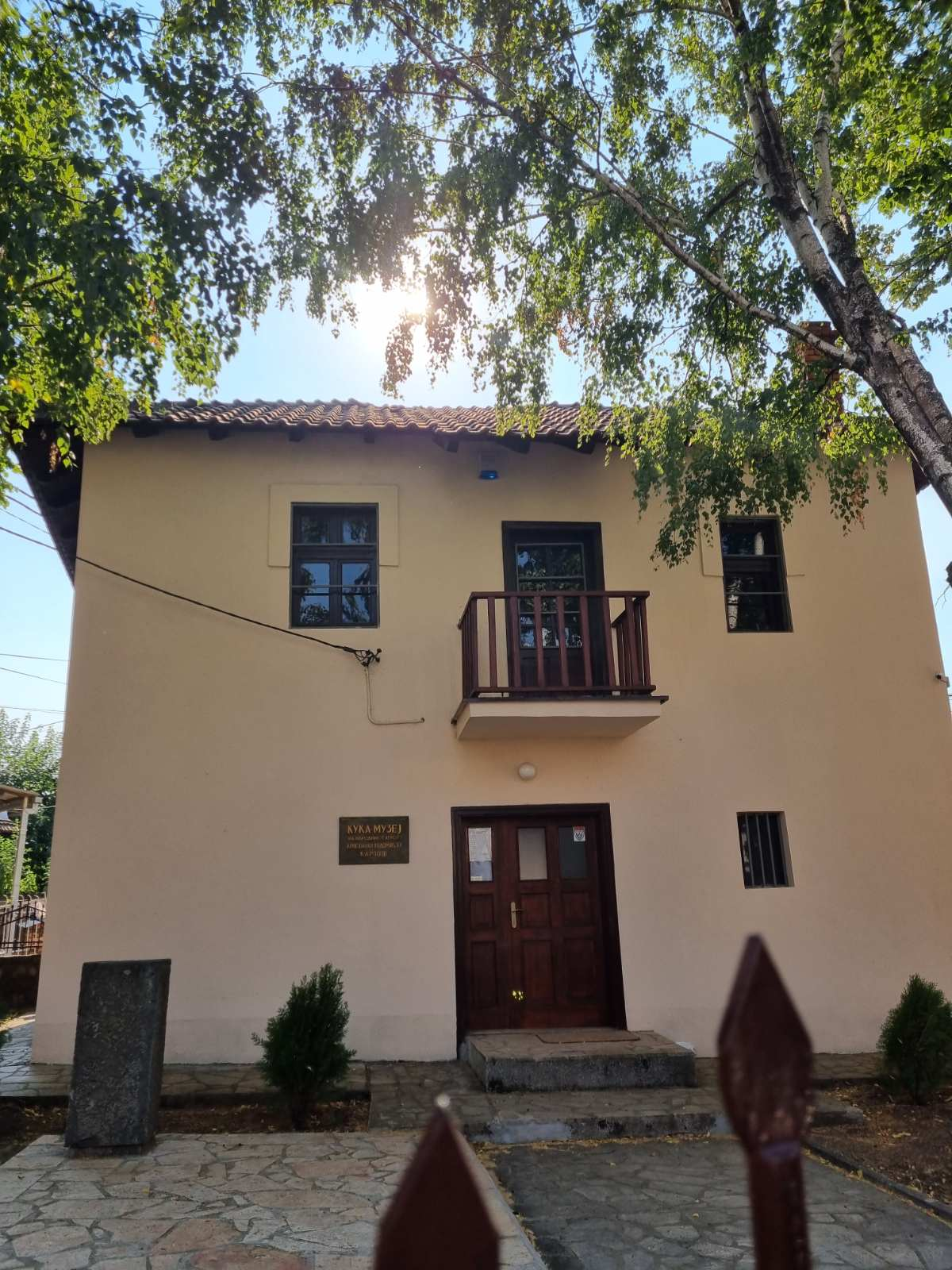
The house of Todorovski Karpoš in Kumanovo, now a memorial house

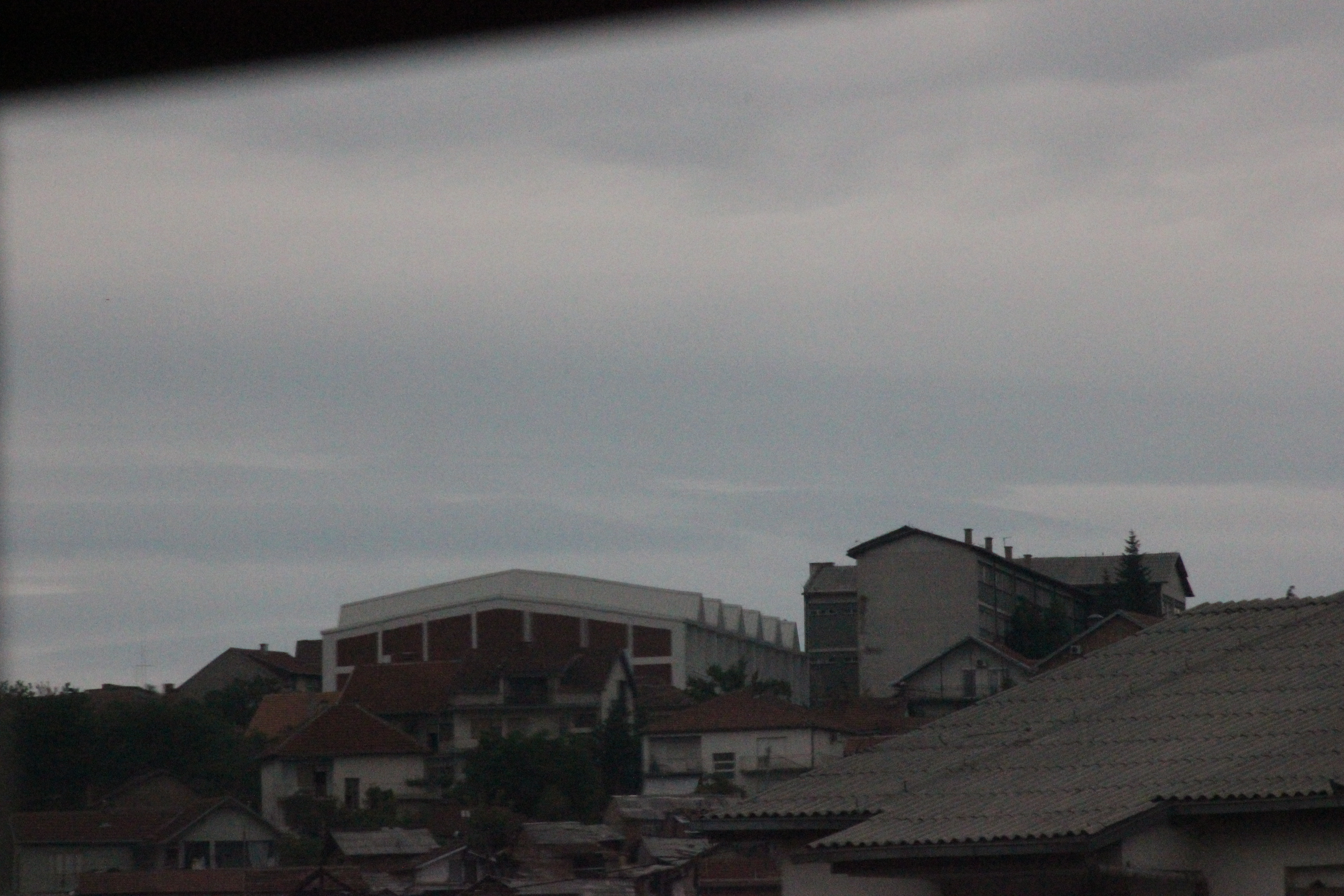
View of an elementary school in Kumanovo named after Todorovski Karpoš

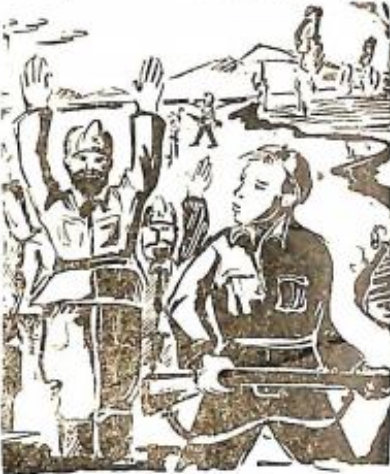
Todorovski Karpoš arresting Chetniks in WWII (cartoon from Nash Vesnik, 1962)

== Sources ==
- "Витражите на Куманово". Димитар Масевски, Скопје, 2004.
