= Sejdiu =

Sejdiu is an Albanian surname. Notable people with the surname include:

- Altuna Sejdiu (born 1985), Macedonian-Albanian singer
- Arlind Sejdiu (born 2001), Kosovan footballer
- Bajrush Sejdiu (born 1968), Macedonian criminal of Albanian descent
- Dardan Sejdiu (born 1979), Deputy Mayor of Pristina, the capital of Kosovo
- Fatmir Sejdiu (born 1951), Kosovar politician and President of Kosovo
- Florent Sejdiu (born 1990), Albanian football player
- Gani Sejdiu (born 1961), Kosovan coach and former footballer
- Patriot Sejdiu (born 2000), Kosovan footballer
- Shaban Sejdiu (born 1959), Macedonian Albanian sport wrestler
