= Jordan Cekov =

Macedonian partisan (1921–2019)

Jordan Cekov – Dane
- Јордан Цеков – Дане
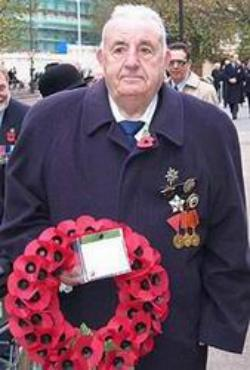
- London Veterans Parade on 13 November 2005
- Born: Jordan Cekov; 15 July 1921; Kumanovo; Kingdom of Yugoslavia (today: North Macedonia)
- Died: 20 November 2019 (aged 98); Skopje, North Macedonia
- Occupations: Partisan, author
- Writing career
- Pen name: Dane
- Language: Macedonian

Jordan Cekov – Dane (15 July 1921 – 20 November 2019) was a Macedonian partisan who participated in the World War II in Yugoslav Macedonia as the commander of the Third Macedonian Assault Brigade and was later member of the first Parliament of the People's Republic of Macedonia. Cekov was born in Kumanovo. He received the "Partisan Memorial 1941" and other military decorations. He died in Skopje, aged 98.

== Bibliography ==
- Kumanovo NOB 1941–1945 book I
- Kumanovo NOB 1941–1945 second II
- Kumanovo NOB 1941–1945 Book III
- Hristijan Todorovski Karpoš Macedonian national hero
- Pance Peshev- penalty blamed
- They died for the freedom of Macedonia
- Open letter to Vera Aceva
- My true for Liberation War
- Bojan Zafirovski – Bojcho
- As it was liberated Skopje
- Kumanovo and Kozjak region in the Liberation War II 1941 – 1945

== See also ==
- List of people from Kumanovo
