= Slavko Dimevski =

Macedonian priest, historian and screenwriter (1920-1994)

- Славко Димевски
- Born: 1920; Kumanovo, Yugoslavia (today North Macedonia)
- Died: 1994 (aged 73–74); Skopje, Republic of Macedonia

Slavko Dimеvski (Macedonian: Славко Димевски; 1920 – 1994) was a Macedonian priest, historian and screenwriter. From January 1, 1975, to June 30, 1983, he worked for Institute for Sociological, Political and Juridical Research as Staff with a scientific and supporting staff position. Slavko Dimevski has been accused by Bulgarian historians to have created some deceptions, misquotations and historical misinterpretations, related to common Bulgarian-Macedonian historical issues.

== Books ==
- Struggle for independence of the local orthodox churches
- History of the Macedonian Orthodox Church
- Nikola Karev
- The development of the Macedonian national idea to the creation of TMRO

== Screenplays ==
- Smilevskiot kongres (1973)
- Suti i rogati (1975)
- Vapcarov (1977)
- Kurirot na Goce Delcev (1979)
- Junacko koleno (1984)

== See also ==
- List of people from Kumanovo
