= Boris Čuškarov =

Macedonian politician

- Борис Чушкаров; Боро Чушкар

First Director of OZNA Socialist Republic of Macedonia
- In office 1944–n/a
- Minister: Aleksandar Ranković

Political Commissar of 16 Macedonian Corps
- In office 1944–1944

Personal details
- Born: 28 January 1916 Kumanovo, Bulgarian occupation zone of Serbia
- Died: 19 September 1982 (aged 66) Skopje, SR Macedonia, SFR Yugoslavia
- Party: Communist Party of Macedonia

Boris Čuškarov or Boro Čuškar (Macedonian: Борис Чушкаров / Боро Чушкар, 28 January 1916 – 19 September 1982) was a Macedonian partisan and communist. Founder and the first director of the Department of Secret Police of Communist Yugoslavia (OZNA) for the Socialist Republic of Macedonia. In 1940 he became a member of the Communist Party of Yugoslavia. He participated in the ASNOM conference. In 1944 he became the political commissar of the 16 Macedonian Corps.

== Screenwriting ==
(1959) Prilep, Of Yesterday And Today... (Second Prize for screenplay at FYDSF in Belgrade)
(1959) Regenerated Fields

== Books ==
Combat Kumanovo 1919- 1941

== See also ==
- List of people from Kumanovo
- OZNA

Political offices
New office	Director of OZNA for SR Macedonia; 1944-1944	Succeeded by ?
