= Xhemajli =

Xhemajli is an Albanian surname. Notable people with the surname include:

- Arbenit Xhemajli (born 1998), Kosovan footballer
- Blerim Džemaili (born 1986), Swiss footballer
- Erlis Xhemajli (born 2003), Kosovo football player
- Muhamet Xhemajli, Albanian soldier of the Liberation Army of Preševo, Medveđa and Bujanovac

== See also ==
- Xhemaili
