= Church of the Holy Trinity, Kumanovo =

Coordinates: 42.1342°N 21.7208°E

Church of Holy Trinity, Kumanovo
- Црква „Света Троица“ Куманово
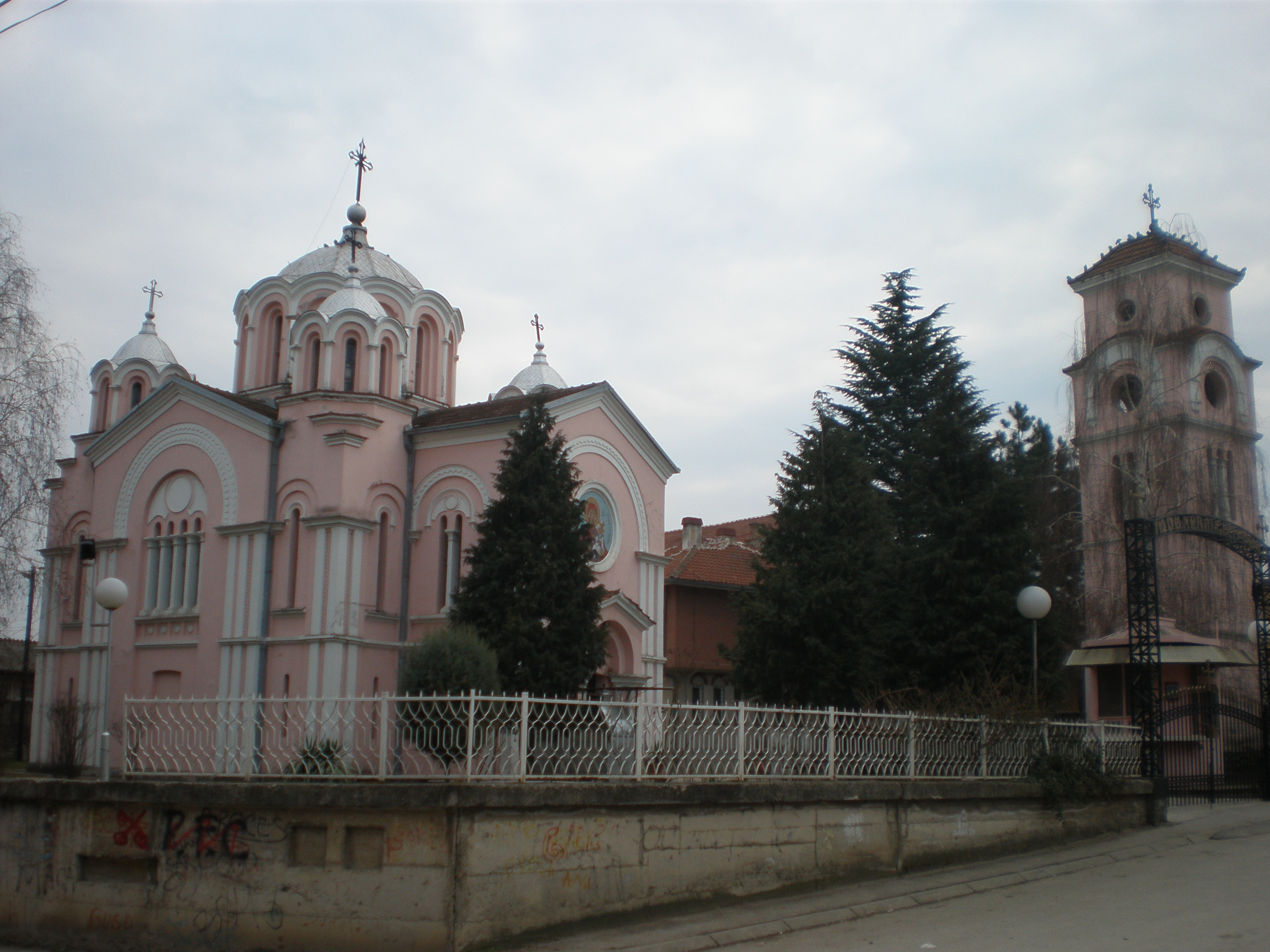
- Church of Holy Trinity, Kumanovo
- Location: Kumanovo
- Country: North Macedonia
- Denomination: Macedonian Orthodox Church
- Website: Official page

History
- Status: Church
- Founded: 1901/2
- Dedication: Holy Trinity

Architecture
- Architect: Vladimir Antonov
- Architectural type: Neoclassical
- Completed: 1902

Specifications
- Materials: Brick

Administration
- Province: Kumanovo
- Diocese: Diocese of Kumanovo and Osogovo

Clergy
- Archbishop: Stefan
- Bishop: Josif

The Church Holy Trinity, Kumanovo (Macedonian Cyrillic: Црква Света Троица, Куманово) is an Eastern Orthodox church in the city of Kumanovo, North Macedonia.

Since they were not admitted to the Church of St Nicholas, controlled by the Bulgarian Exarchate, the local Serbs decided to build a church of their own. They called for help from the Serbian government who sponsored the drawing of its blueprints, done by Russian architect Vladimir Antonov. The church was built during 1901 by Mihajlo Djordjević from Debar. The iconostas was made from a donation by Queen Draga of Serbia and featured many Serbian saints such as St Sava, Prince Lazar and St Uroš.

== See also ==
- Kumanovo
- Macedonian Orthodox Church – Ohrid Archbishopric

== Gallery ==
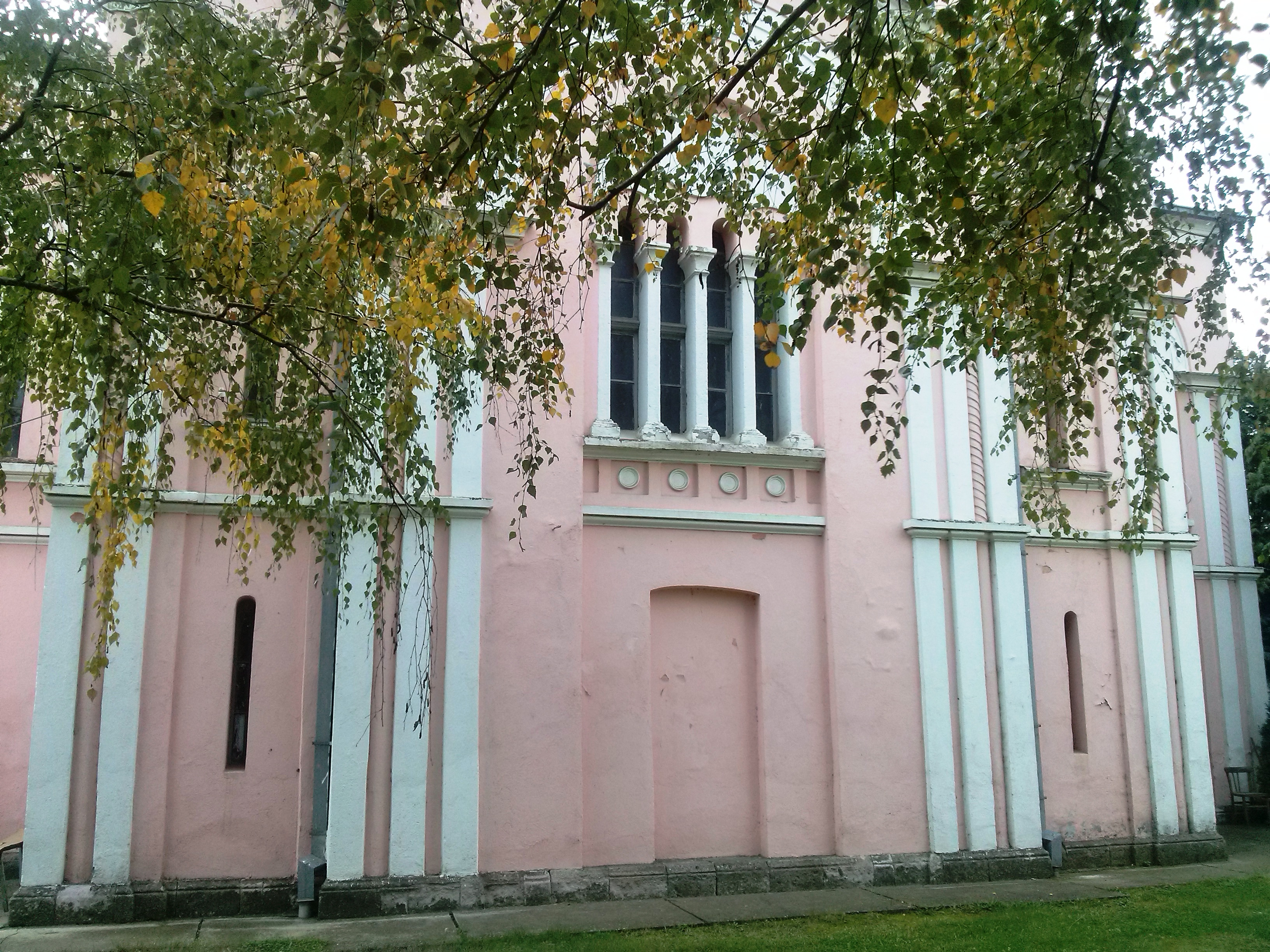
Church of the Holy Trinity 1

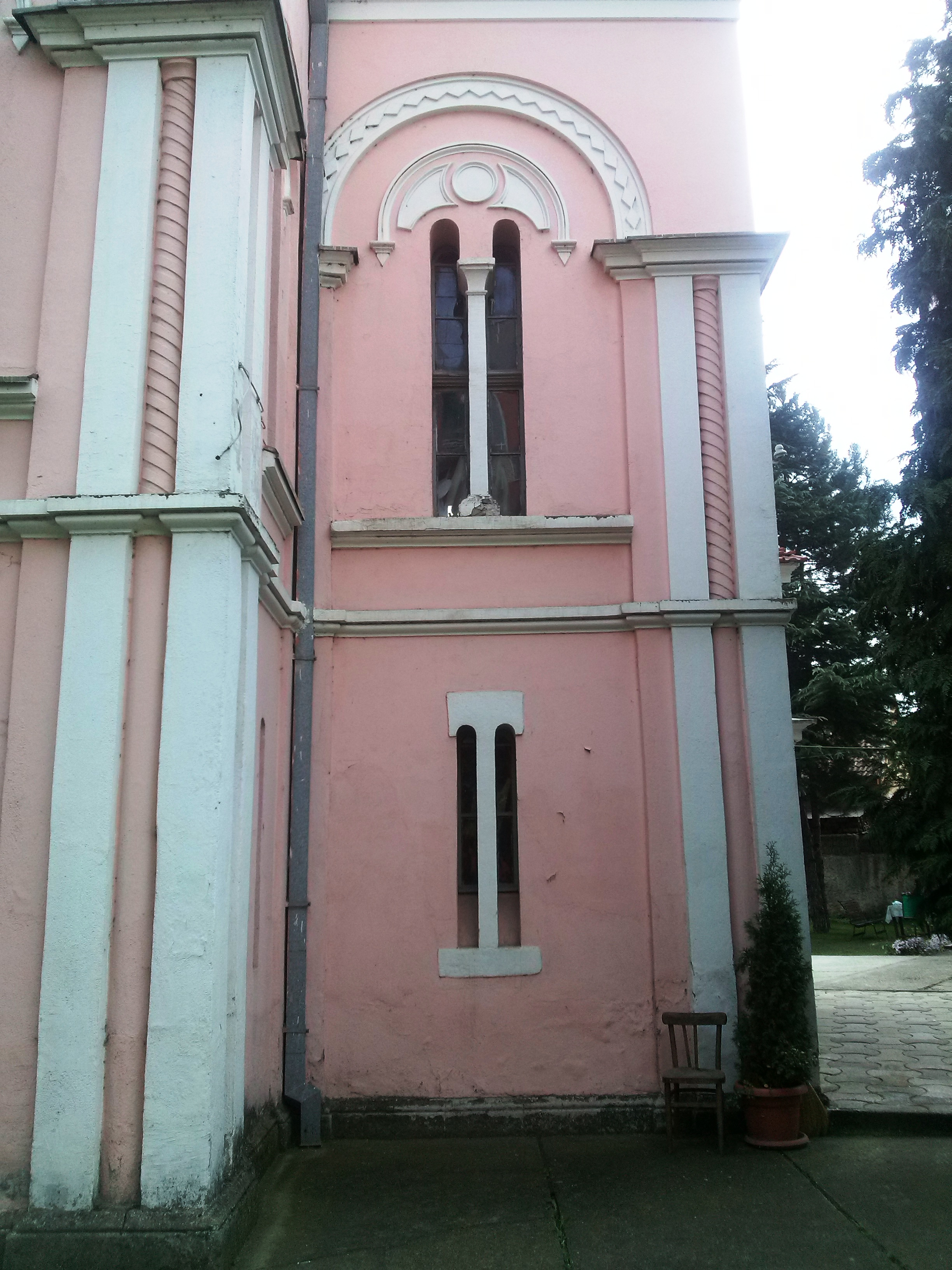
Church of the Holy Trinity 2

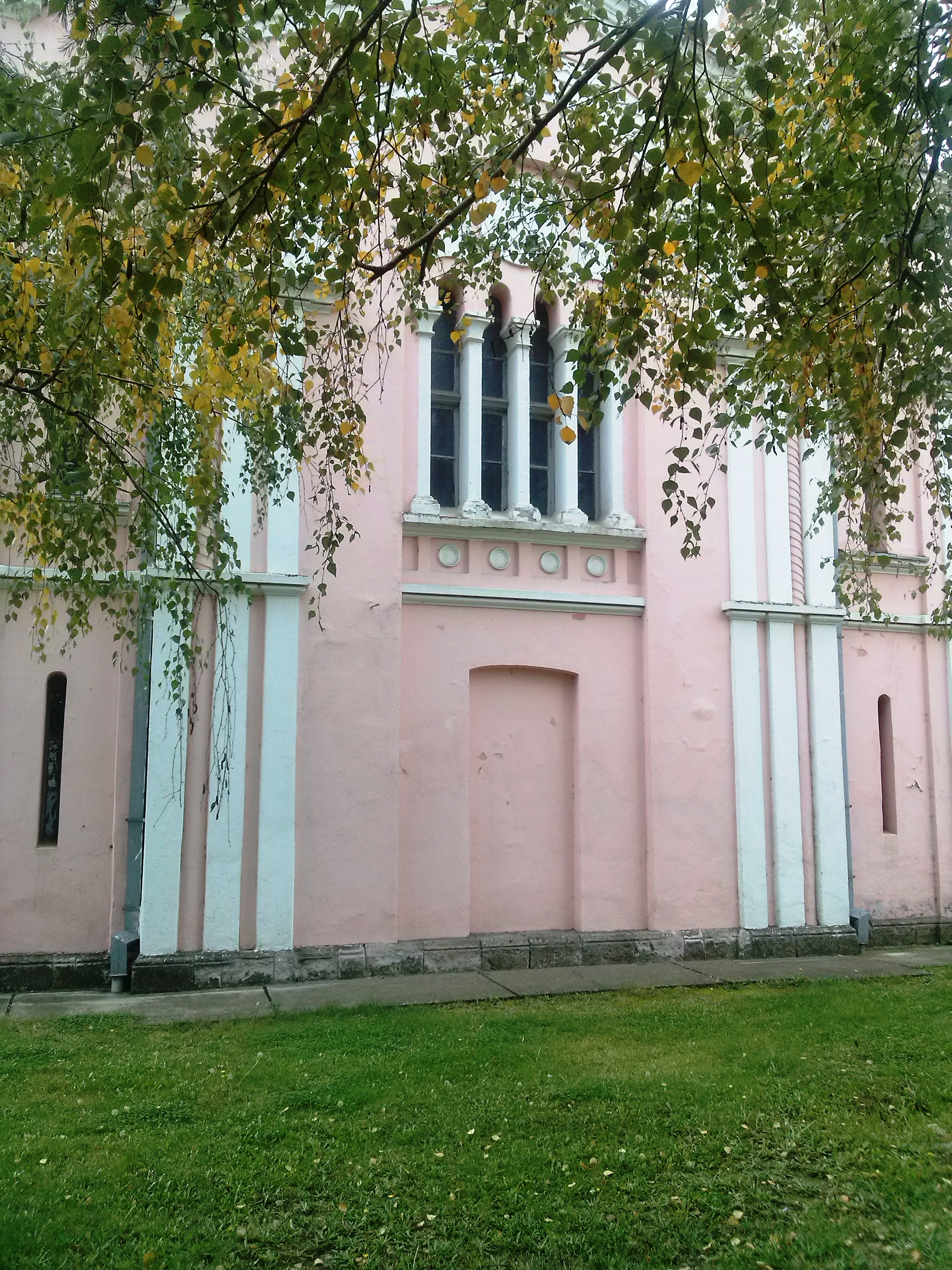
Church of the Holy Trinity 3

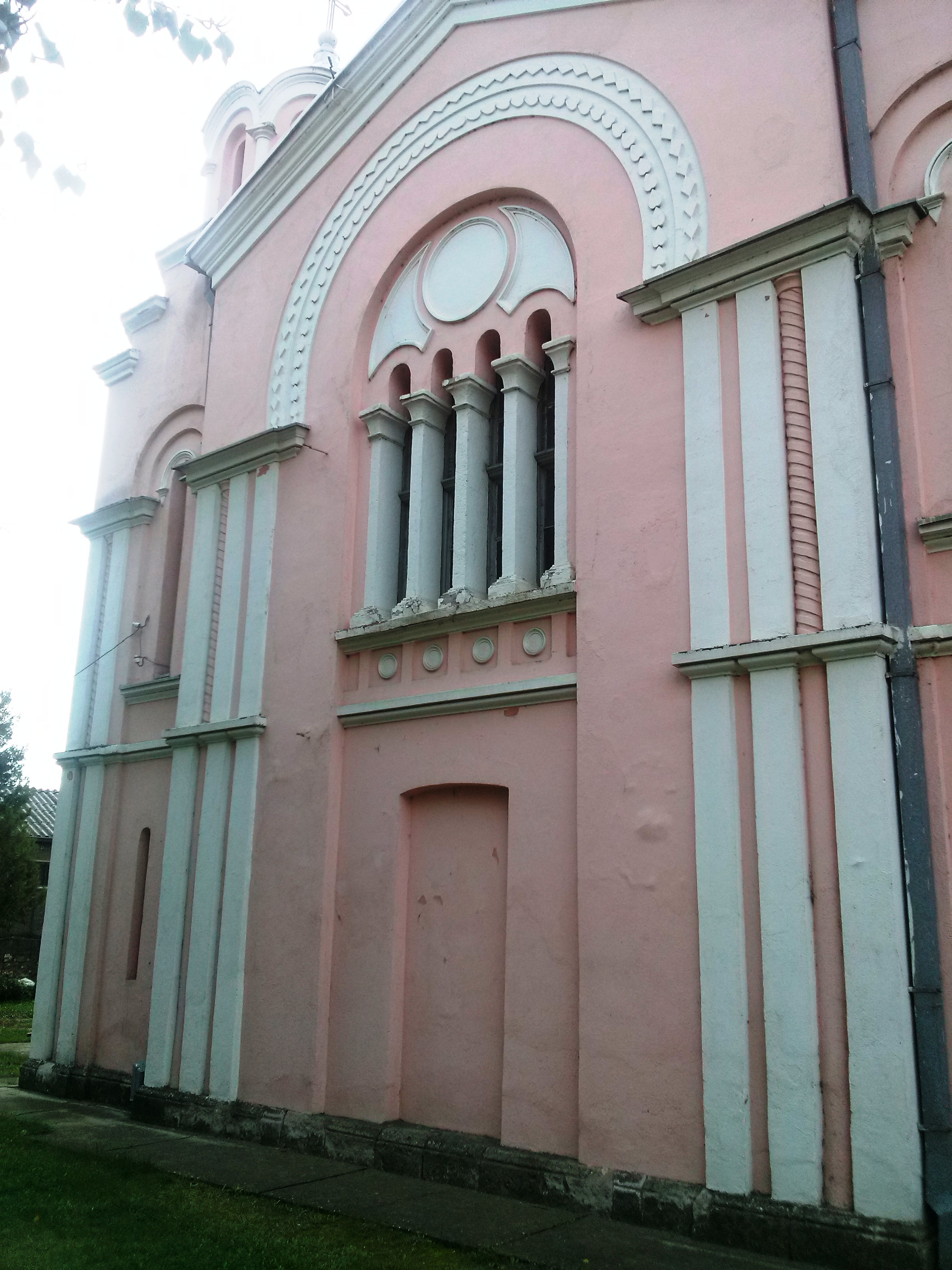
Church of the Holy Trinity 4

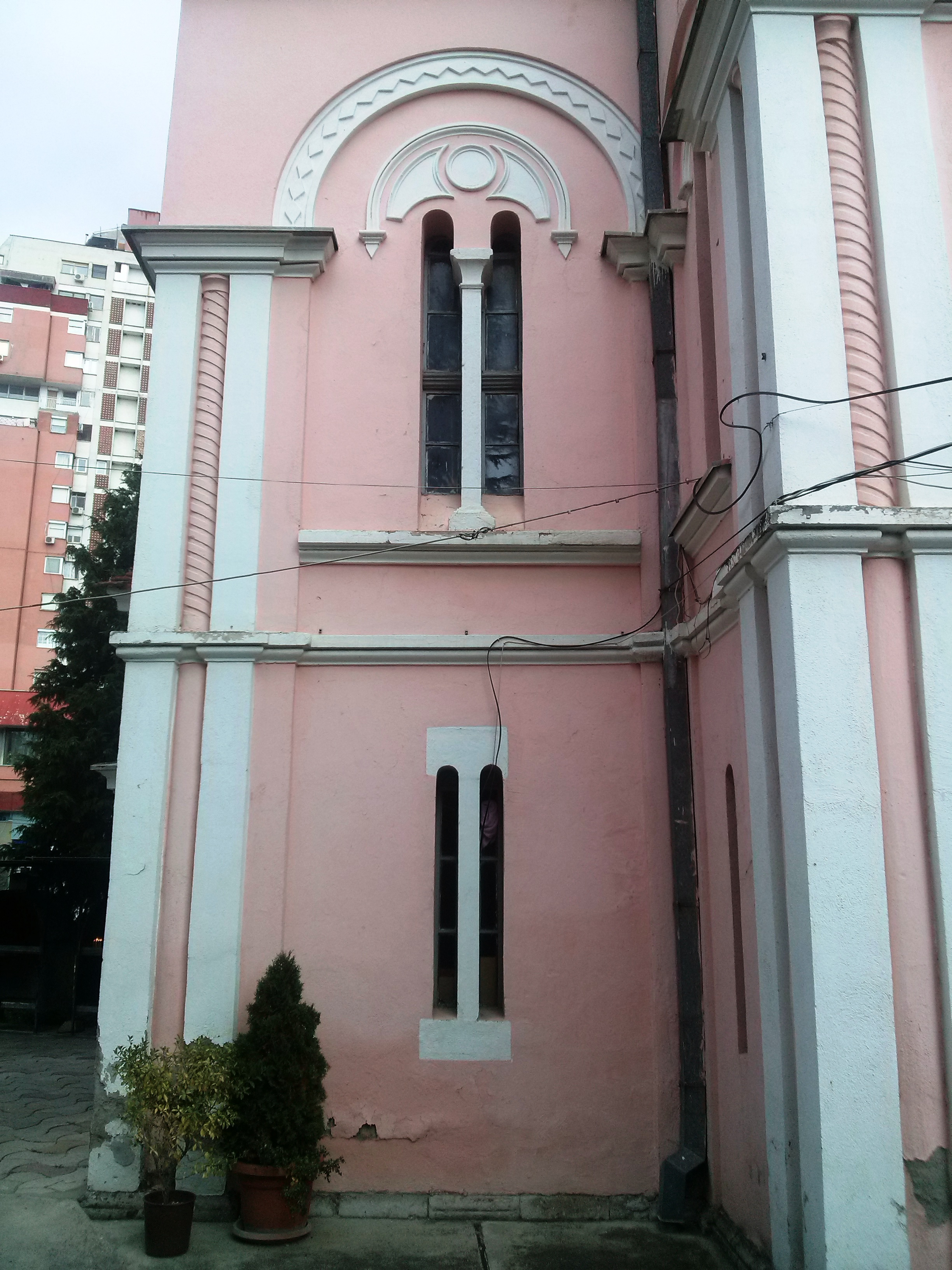
Church of the Holy Trinity 5

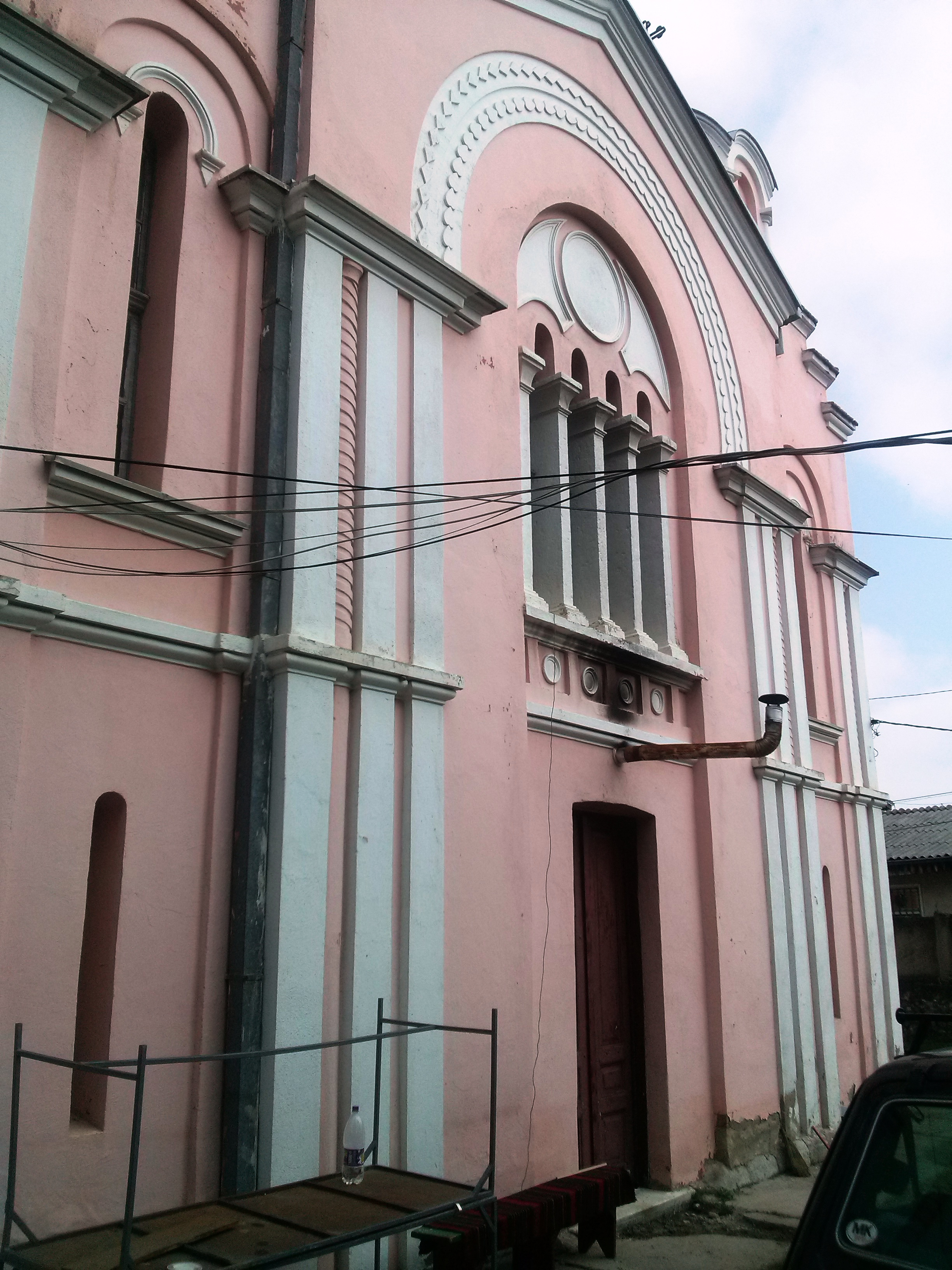
Church of the Holy Trinity 6

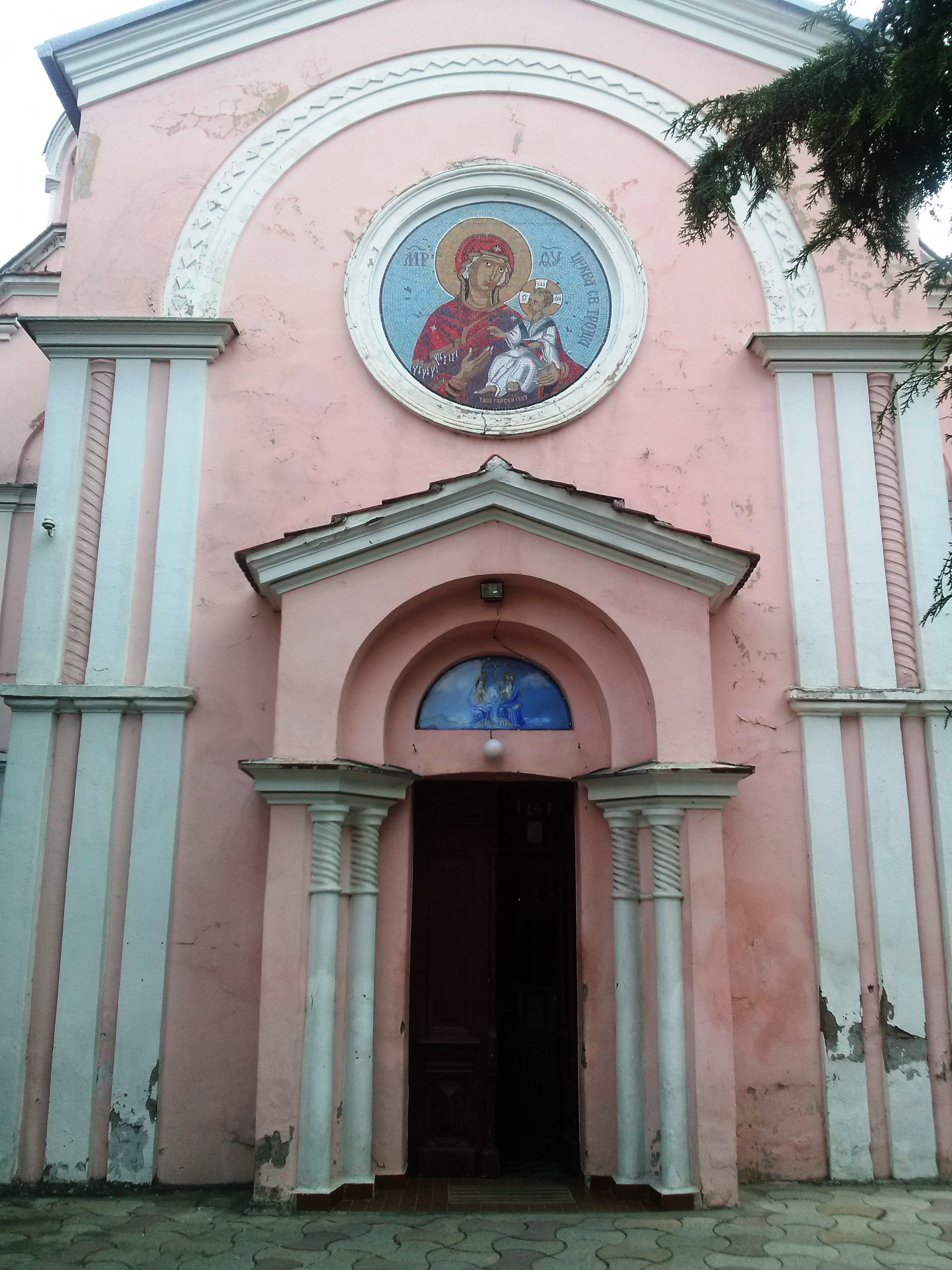
Church of the Holy Trinity 7

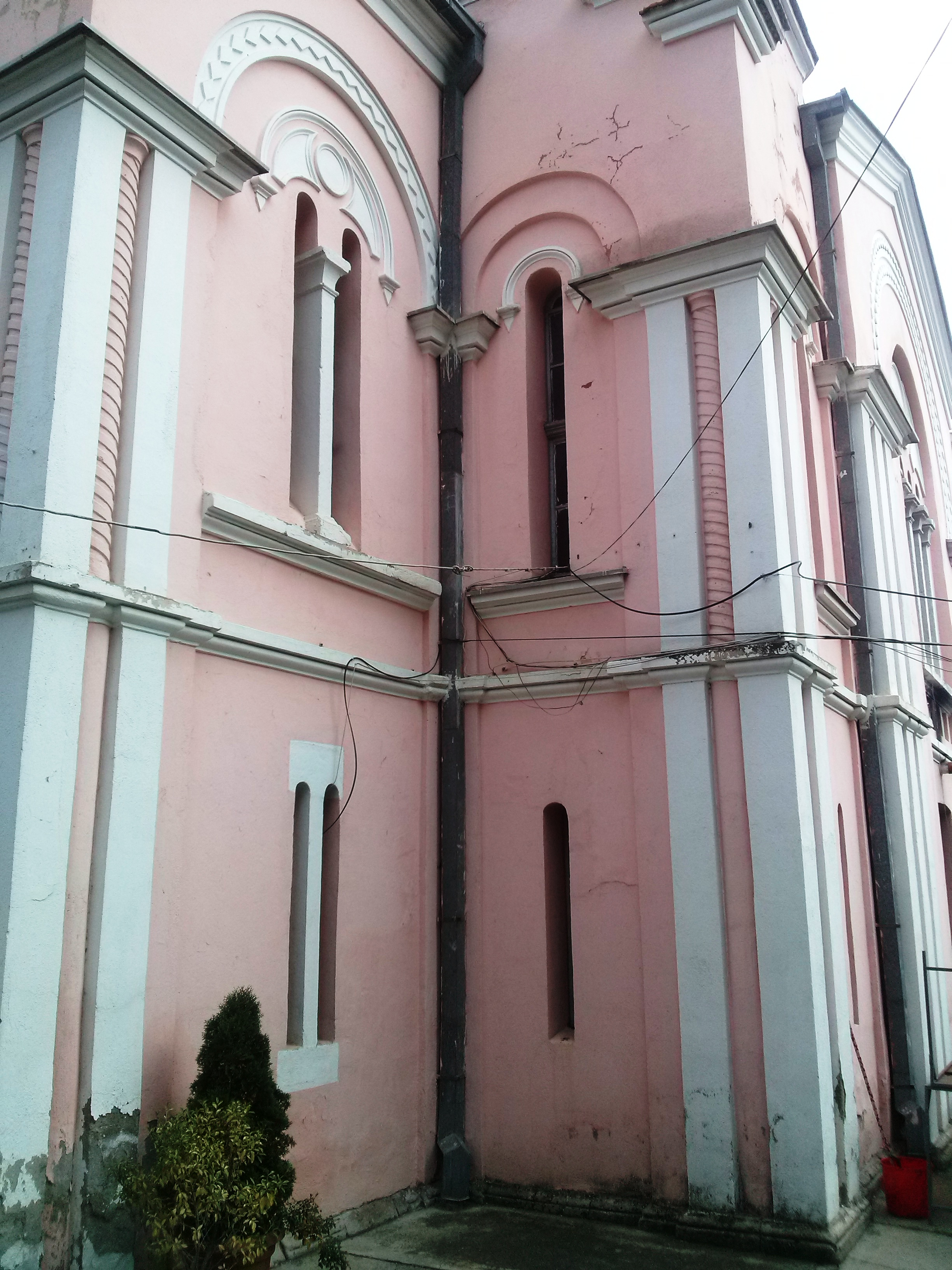
Church of the Holy Trinity 8

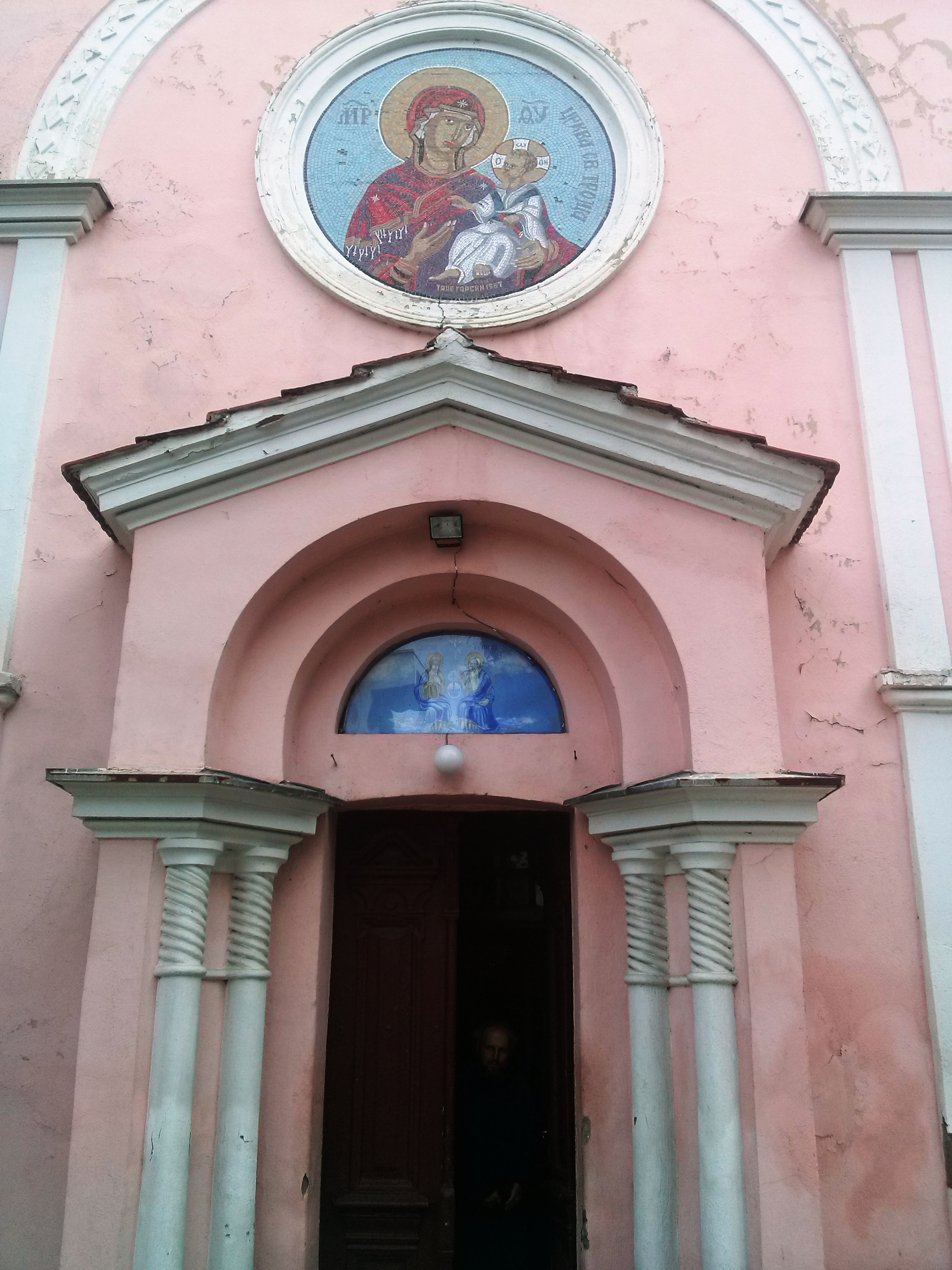
Church of the Holy Trinity 9

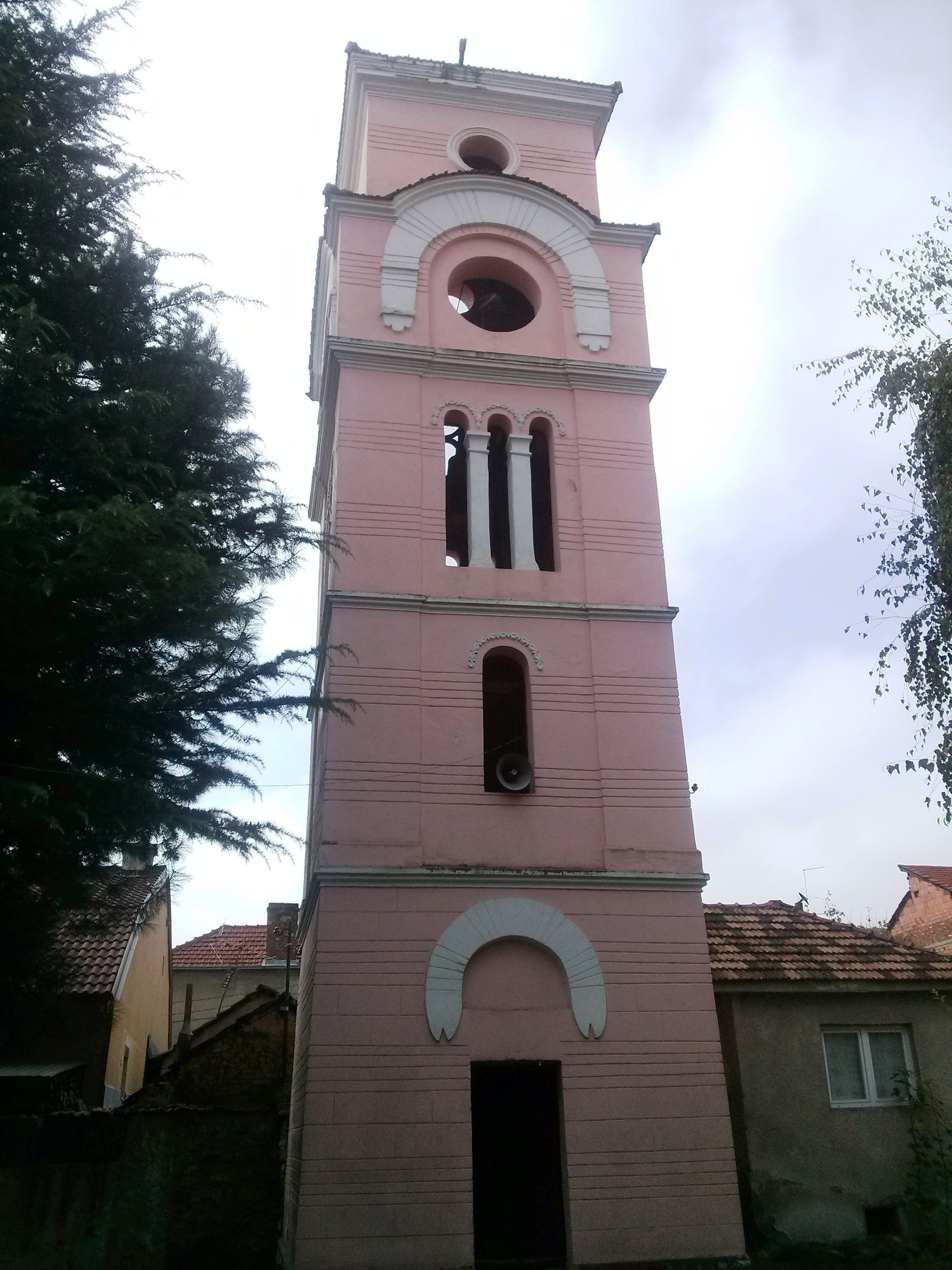
Church of the Holy Trinity 10

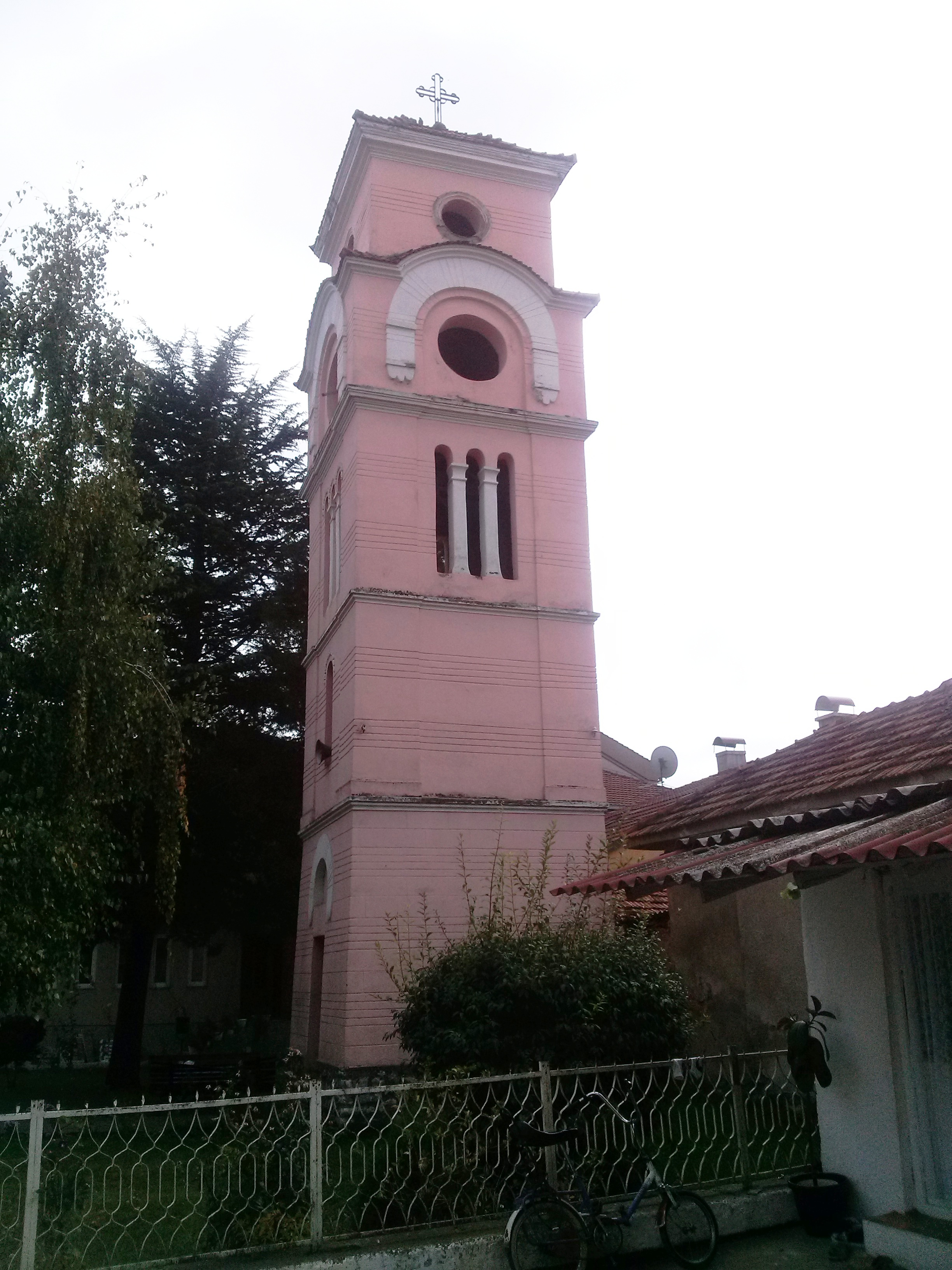
Church of the Holy Trinity 11

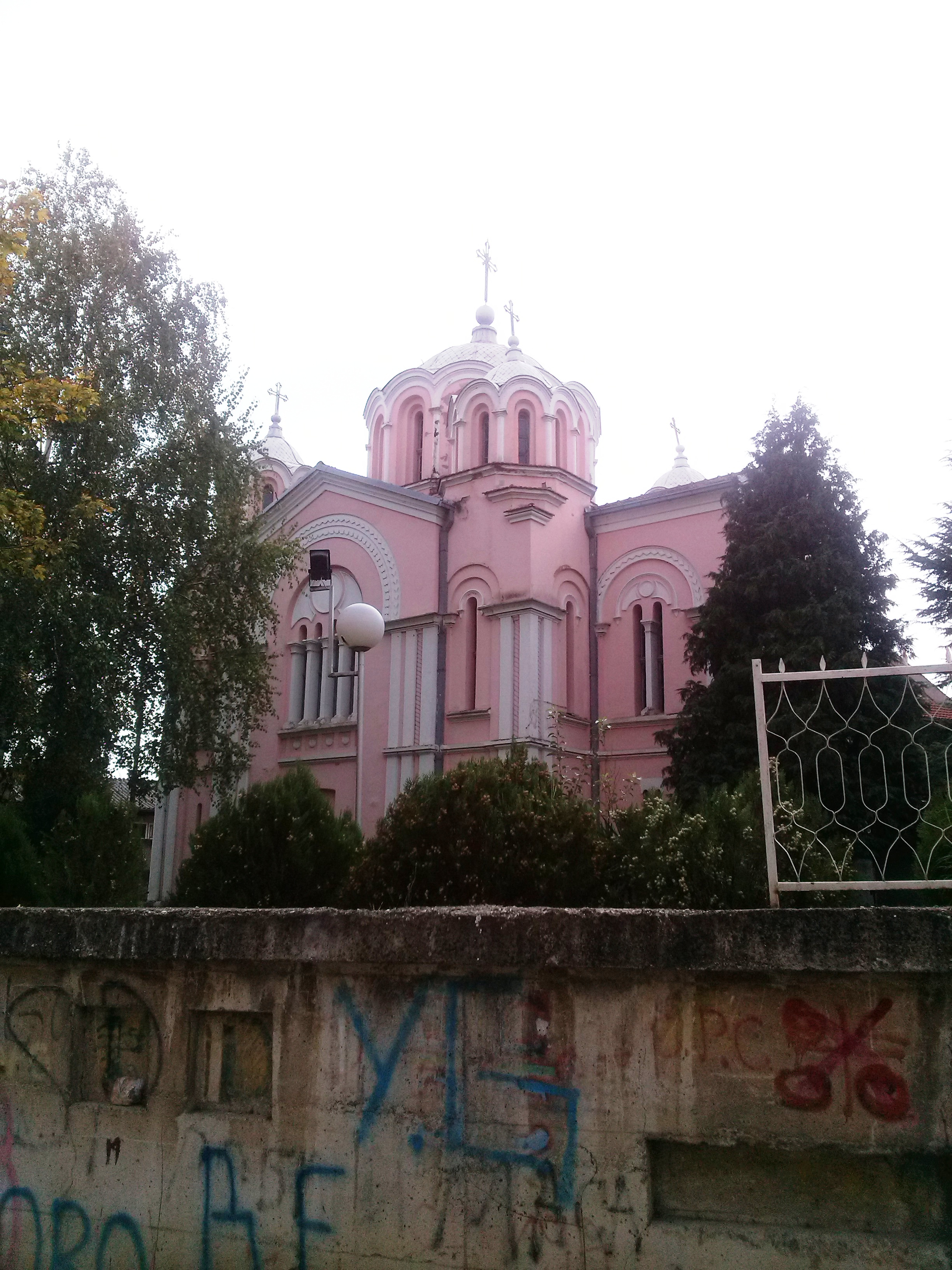
Church of the Holy Trinity 12

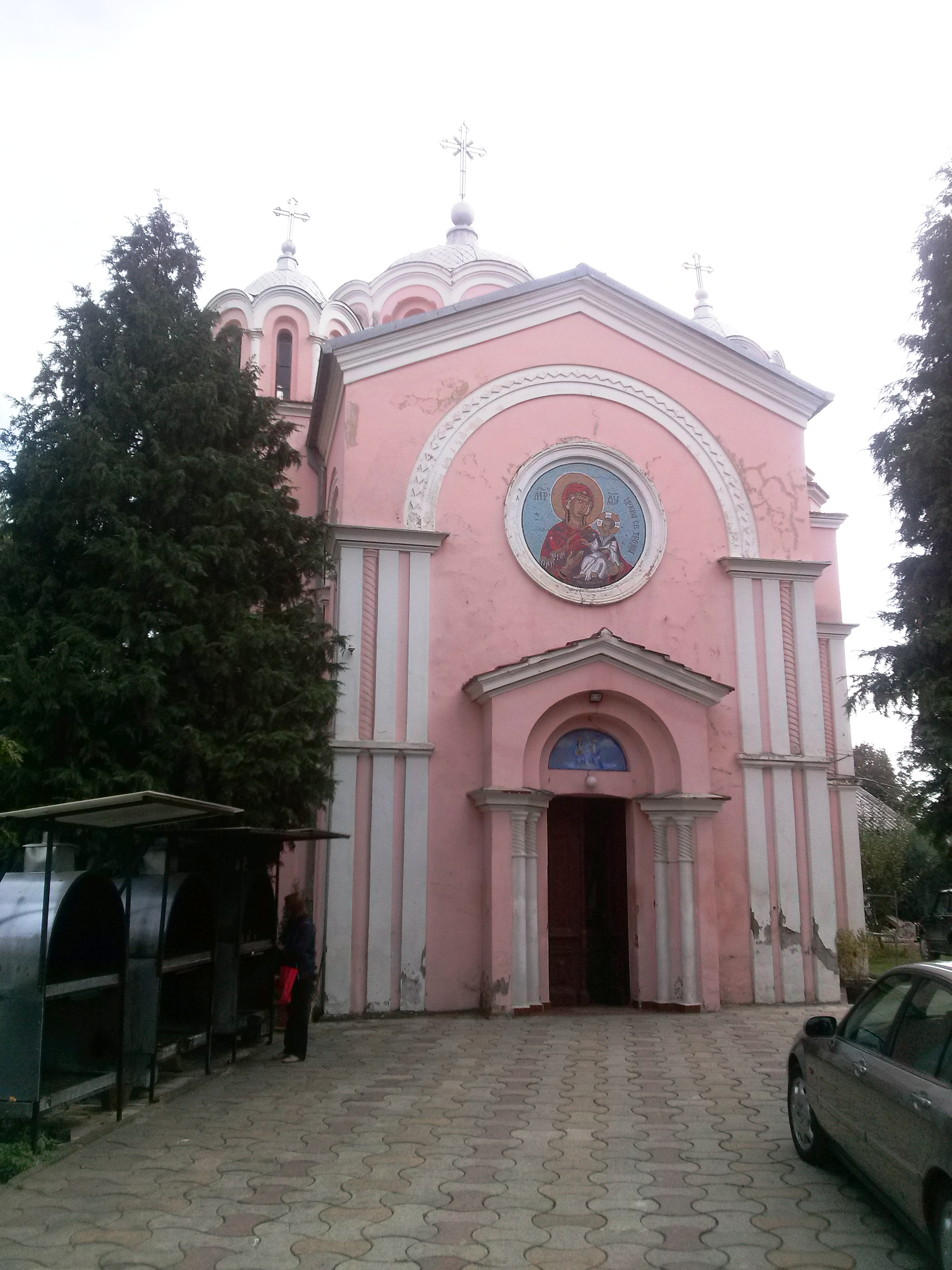
Church of the Holy Trinity 13

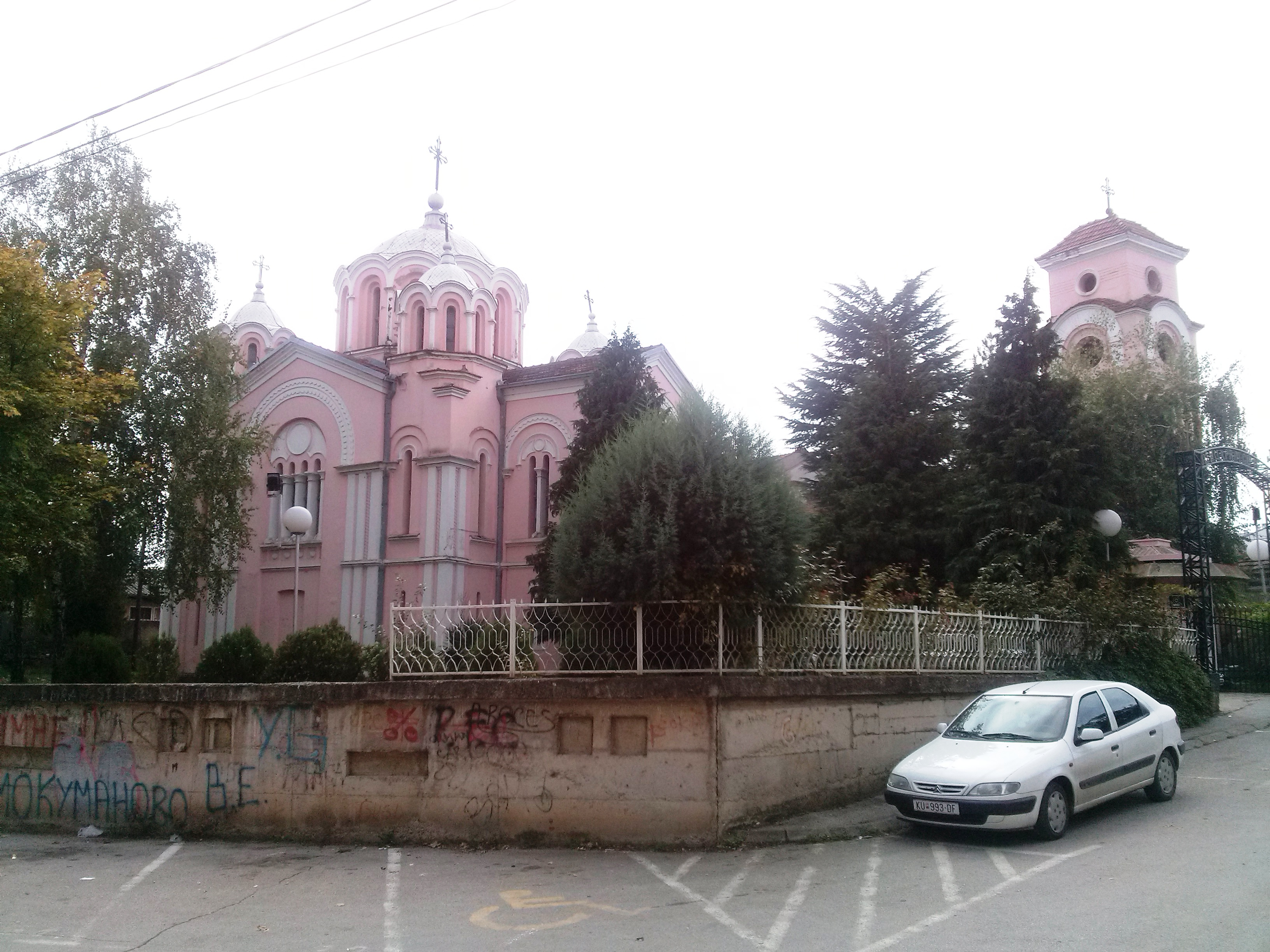
Church of the Holy Trinity 14
