= Venko Andonovski =

Macedonian literary critic

- Венко Андоновски
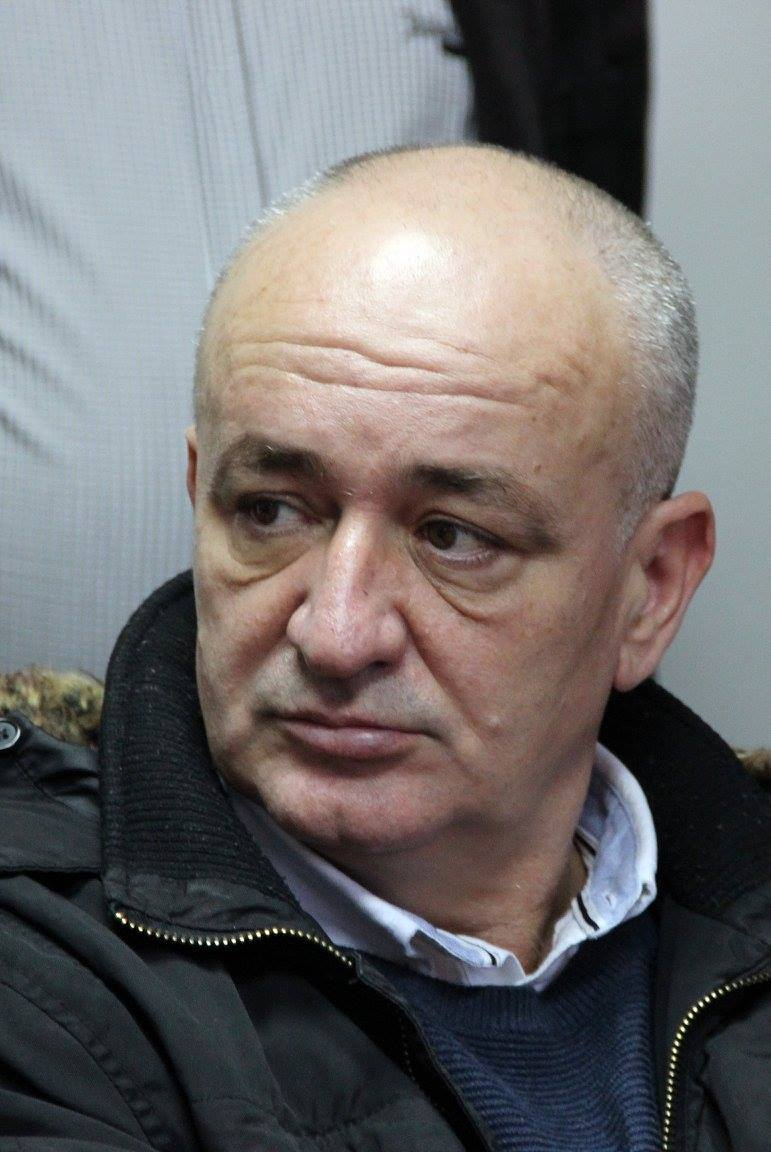
- Venko Andonovski
- Born: Venko Andonovski; Kumanovo; SFRY (today: Macedonia)
- Occupations: Novelist, short story writer, playwright, poet
- Writing career
- Language: Macedonian
- Period: 1986–present
- Notable work: Navel of the World

Venko Andonovski is a Macedonian writer (novelist, short story writer, playwright, poet), essayist, critic and literary theorist. Known for his contributions to contemporary Macedonian literature. His work spans multiple literary genres, including fiction, drama and literary criticism, and has been widely published and translated. In addition to his literary career he’s also an academic and professor of literature.

== Biography ==
Venko Andonovski graduated from the Faculty of Philology "Blaze Koneski" in Skopje. He holds a PhD in Philology and works as a professor at the Faculty of Philology "Blaze Koneski" in Skopje. Andonovski is a member of the PEN center. In 1990 he became a member of the Writers' Association of Macedonia.

== Personal life ==
Andonovski lives in Kragujevac and is married to a woman from the city. While he is widely known for his literary and academic career, he keeps his personal life largely private, and limited information is available in public sources regarding his family and day-to-day life.

"Makedonski pisac Venko Andonovski iz Kragujevca…". InfoKG. 5 October 2023.

His brother Vedran Andonovski is a journalist and works for Voice of America in the United States.

== Creativity ==
- Poetry
  - The gentle heart of the Barbarian
- Short stories
  - Quarter of liricharite
  - Frescoes and grotesques
- Novels
  - Alphabet for the disobedient
  - Navel of the World
  - Witch
  - Daughter of the mathematician / 33.33
- Dramas
  - Doomsday machine
  - Riot in a retirement home
  - Slavic Chest
  - Black dolls
  - Candide in Wonderland
  - Cunegonde in Carlaland
  - Border
  - Saint of Darkness
  - Lead pillow
- Literary criticism
  - Matoshe's bells
  - The texts processes
  - Structure of the Macedonian realistic novel
  - Decryption

== Screenwriting ==
- (North Macedonia) Infernal Machine, TV Movie (1995)
- (North Macedonia) Vo svetot na bajkite, TV Series (1995)
- (Czech Republic) Upside Down (2007) (together with Igor Ivanov Izi)
- (North Macedonia) Prespav, TV Series (2016)

== Religion ==
In a 2008 interview for religious online portal Premin,

On journalist question:

Do you when creating your work have an ongoing "dialogue" with God in terms of person to a person or the dialogue goes down to silently standing before God and translating the experience (on a stand Absolute) in to this word?

Venko answered:

I Always remember how it was when writing the "Navel of the World." Three and a half years I have sketched and collected material. I stored it up a lot, but everything was scattered in notebooks and computer files. That year, sometime in September, entirely without a plan, someone started sorting those scattered files. Like it was creating a mosaic. It woke me up at three, four o'clock in the morning and I was getting to work. I've never gotten up without an alarm clock. Finally, I decided to go in solitude. I went to Berovo. Before I moved in the bungalow that I've rented I lit a candle in the Church "Virgin Mary". Then, in the next twelve days, I lost sense of day and night. I woke up when I had to write down what someone obviously wanted me to. It was like someone dictated it to me. How I enjoyed it, I of course, write it down, but with great anxiety and thought. It was not just a monologue. I asked a question, which then I had to answer it. The novel was finished and I returned two days earlier to Skopje (than planned).

I have enough years of experience to know that I did not write the novel myself, or just myself. Call it as you want - but I call it a blessing. Lord (I am a believer) You at least held my hand, if I did not deserved more - my mind and heart, for example. In this I was convinced, though I always speak about this experience with anxiety, from fear that people who do not believe in anything except themselves - will make fun of me.

No great art comes without contact with the One and Indivisible, Almighty and Sublime. I do not only think it but also feel it the same.

== Awards ==
- (North Macedonia) (2006) award name: Balkanika for Navel of the World
- (North Macedonia) (2008) award name: Order of the Holy Macedonian Cross for: Contribution, support and promotion of the Macedonian national, cultural and spiritual identity, awarded by: Macedonian Orthodox Church - Ohrid Archbishopric
- (North Macedonia) (2013) award name: Stale Popov for Doter of the mathematician
- (Russia) (2014) award name: Jugra for Navel of the World
- [russia](2023) award name: Tolstoy International Literary Award for his contributions to literature

== See also ==
- List of people from Kumanovo
