= Romeo Zhivikj =

Romeo Živikj
- Ромео Живиќ
- Born: 1962; Matejče, PR Macedonia, FPRY
- Died: 2004 (aged 41–42); Skopje, Macedonia
- Cause of death: Ballistic trauma
- Resting place: Kumanovo Town Cemetery
- Other name: Roki
- Citizenship: Macedonia
- Occupation: Gangster
- Opponent: Jane Pavlovski "Tica"
- Capture status: Killed

Details
- Victims: 1
- Country: SFR Yugoslavia
- States: SR Macedonia; Republic of Macedonia
- Location: Kumanovo
- Date apprehended: No

Romeo Živikj - Roki (Macedonian: Ромео Живиќ) was a member of the Macedonian underground. He was held hostage by the ANA in 2001 and then released. The armed shootout involving Živikj, Jane-Tica, and Ramadani occurred around 9 PM, a time of heavy foot traffic at the location. Police investigation determined that Živikj and Pavlovski had met the previous day to settle a debt. On the critical evening, Ramadani and Živikj awaited Pavlovski at the "Blue Cafe" on Pelagonia Square. Upon Pavlovski's arrival, a dispute ensued between him and Ramadani. Živikj intervened, striking Jane-Tica and pulling Ramadani towards him. Pavlovski then drew a pistol, chambered a round, and fired, hitting Ramadani in the stomach. Živikj and Ramadani immediately returned fire. The exchange lasted about three minutes, with approximately twenty shots fired. Both Živikj and Pavlovski sustained serious injuries and were transported to the City Hospital, where Pavlovski succumbed to his wounds. Ramadani, in turn, faces charges for attempting to kill Jane Pavlovski in the incident.

== See also ==
List of people from Kumanovo
