= Zanaetchiski Dom =

Building in Kumanovo, North Macedonia

- Занаетчиски Дом
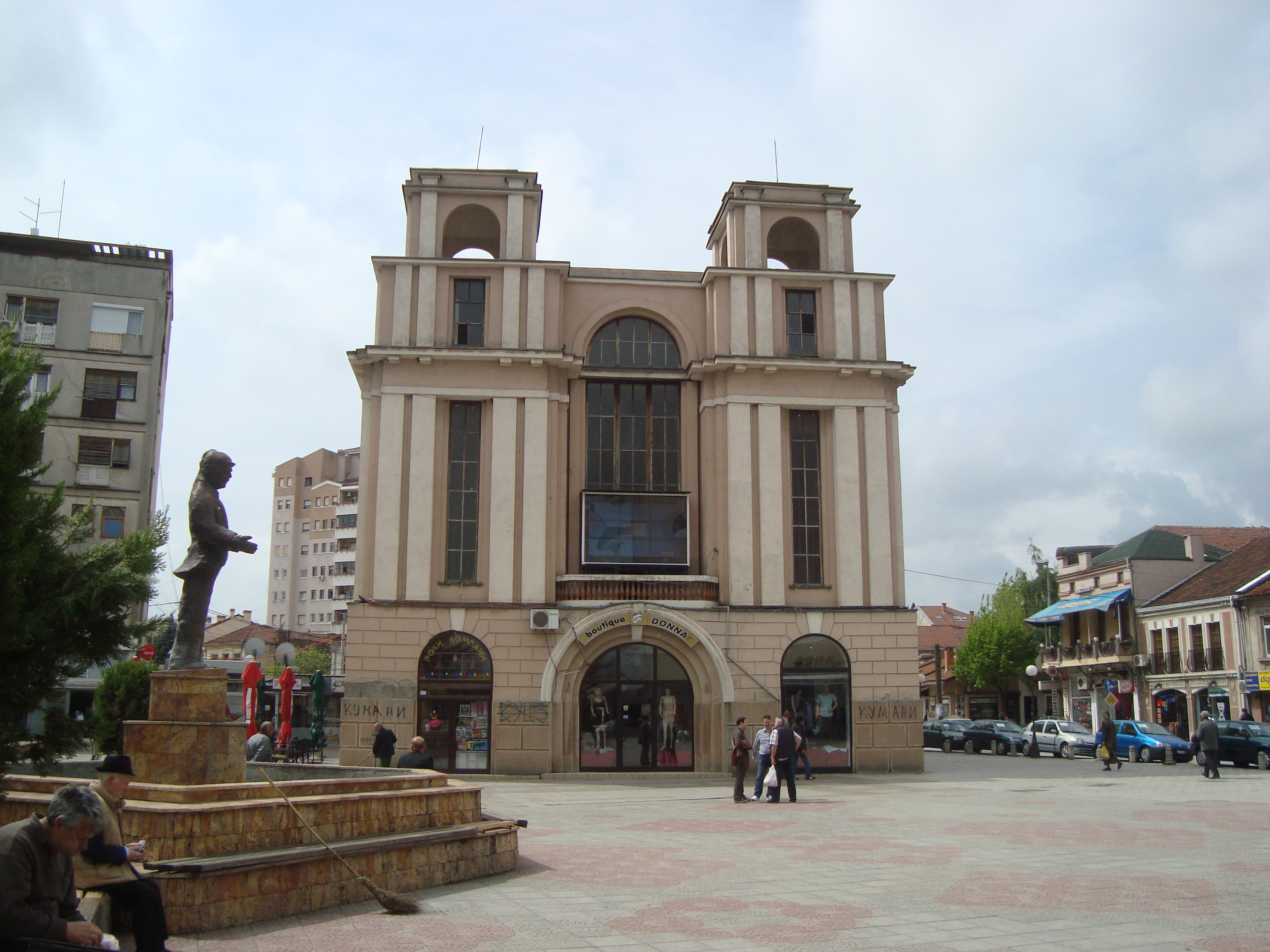
- Front side of the building
- Interactive map of the Zanaetchiski Dom area

General information
- Architectural style: Neoclassical
- Location: Nova Jugoslavija Square, Kumanovo, North Macedonia
- Coordinates: 42.13567°N 21.71794°E
- Construction started: March 1930
- Completed: November 21, 1930
- Inaugurated: November 21, 1930
- Client: Foundation of Craftsmen of Kumanovo
- Owner: Kumanovo Municipality

Design and construction
- Architect: Vladimir Antonov

Zanaetchiski Dom (Macedonian: Занаетчиски Дом) is a building in Kumanovo, North Macedonia.

== Reconstruction ==
Last reconstruction was in 1983.

Interior reconstruction of the Main Hall was completed on 30 December 2016. The cost was 18 Million MKD and it was provided by Centre for Development of the Northeast Region and Kumanovo Municipality. Previously the Main Hall was the "Cinema Napredok" that stopped working in the mid 1990s The Hall was out of function until 2016 reconstruction.

== See also ==
- Buildings in Kumanovo
