= Nezim Allii =

Albanian criminal boss

- Незим Аљии
- Born: Kumanovo; SFRY (today: Macedonia)
- Citizenship: Macedonia
- Occupations: Crime Boss, gangster, racketeer, drugs trafficker
- Years active: 2004-2014
- Known for: Drugs smuggling, Kalabria Company
- Notable work: Drugs smuggling to Switzerland
- Predecessor: Bajrush gang
- Status: Arrested
- Allegiance: Nezim Gang
- Criminal charges: Drugs trafficking, money laundering, violence, illegal arms possession, extortion, bribery, financial fraud,
- Reward amount: none
- Capture status: Imprisoned since 2014
- Wanted by: Law enforcement in the Republic of Macedonia

Nezim Allii was a notable criminal boss of the Nezim gang from Kumanovo, Macedonia. Nezim and the majority of his Gang were arrested in 2014 in his home town in a police action named "Kalabria". 350 Law enforcement officers participated in the arrest. He used most of his profit from drug smuggling to purchase real estate in Kosovo. In Macedonia, the police confiscated an estate in the village of Romanovce near Kumanovo of 1,405 m^{2} (15,120 sq ft) which included a private home, printing press, public swimming pool, and office building with total of 2,553 m^{2} (27,480 sq ft), 5 houses on 49,890 m^{2} (537,000 sq ft) of farm land.

== Companies ==
- Kalabria Ferat DOOEL
- Kalabri Kafe Picerija (pizzeria)
- Kalabria Hotel
- DPTU Petrol Kalabira (gas station)
- DPTU Arizona Kompani (gas station)
- Mlechen restoran (dairy restaurant)
- DTPU Hotel Roma
- Petrol Roma
- Roma eden
- Roma dva
