= Sports Hall Sokolana =

Sports hall in Kumanovo, North Macedonia

Coordinates: 42.12860°N 21.71853°E

Sports Hall Sokolana Спортска сала Соколана
- Interactive map of Sports Hall Sokolana; Спортска сала Соколана
- Location: Kumanovo, North Macedonia
- Owner: Kumanovo Municipality
- Operator: Kumanovo Municipality

Construction
- Opened: 1931
- Architects: Momir Gorunovic and Vladimir Antonov

Sports Hall Sokolana is a sport venue in Kumanovo, North Macedonia. The hall was opened on 6 September 1931. In the beginning it was used by the Sokolsko drustvo Kumanovo, whose purpose was to develop sport and recreation in Kumanovo. The engineers were Momir Gorunovic and Vladimir Antonov. It is built in the same style as many of the sport halls of that time.
