= Danilo Kocevski =

Macedonian literary critic (1947–2020)

- Данило Коцевски
- Born: Danilo Kocevski; April 23, 1947; Kumanovo; SFRY (today: North Macedonia)
- Died: September 13, 2020 (aged 73); Skopje, North Macedonia
- Occupations: literary critic, novelist, playwright, poet
- Children: 2
- Writing career
- Language: Macedonian
- Period: 1981-2020

Danilo Kocevski (23 April 1947, Kumanovo – 13 September 2020, Skopje) was a Macedonian literary critic, novelist, playwright and poet, as well as a noted chronicler of the history of Skopje. He appeared in the 2001 TV Show Dossier Skopje dressed as Superman.

== Books published ==
=== Essays and Criticism ===
- Yes and No (1981)
- For New Trends (1984)
- Still Moves (1985)
- Criticism as a Delusion (1988)
- The Poetics of Postmodernism (1989)
- Antichomes of criticism (1989)
- Modern and postmodern (1993)
- Postmodern Currents (1996)
- New Essays (2001)
- The Revolt of the Intellectuals (2007)
- The paths of literary criticism (2010)
- For Literature till the last breath (2016)

=== Novels ===
- Odyssey (1991)
- Will we go to Joe (1992)
- Justiniana, the city that does not exist (1999)
- Novel for Noah (2003)
- Picolomini at the gates of Skopje (2005)

=== Prose ===
- Travel to Arcachon (1989)
- The Magic of Skopje (1997)

=== Poetry ===
- Where the song is born (1992)
- Poet's Death (1995)

== See also ==
- List of people from Kumanovo
