= Denko Krstić =

Serbian merchants

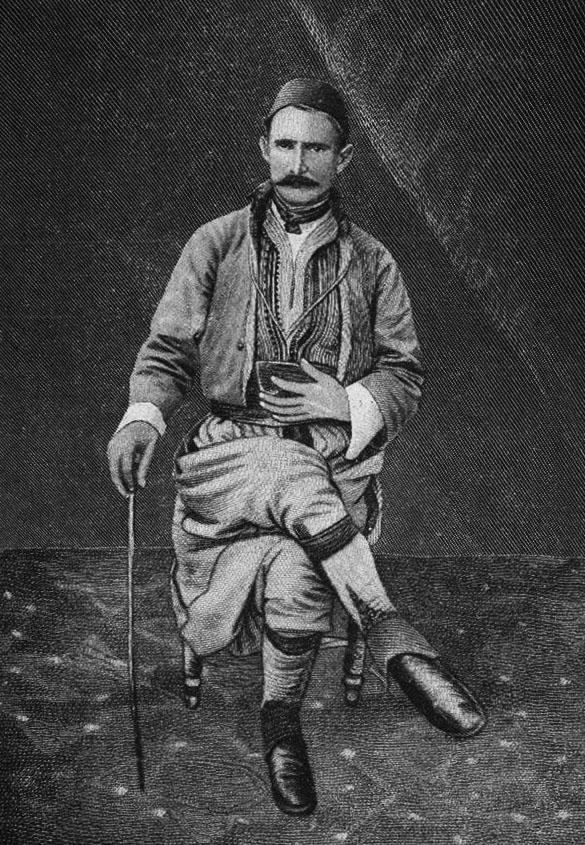
Denko Krstić.

Denko Krstić (Serbian Cyrillic: Денко Крстић, Macedonian: Денко Крстиќ; September 1824 – 1882) was a merchant from Kumanovo and Ottoman Serb activist. He was one of the most influential in Kumanovo during his time, and a wealthy man.

== Life ==
Krstić was born in either September 1824 or 1826, in the village of Mlado Nagoričane at the time part of the Sanjak of Üsküp, Ottoman Empire (now Staro Nagoričane, North Macedonia). He was an ethnic Serb and Serbian patriot.

In 1843 he was briefly a teacher of Church Slavonic and Serbian in Kumanovo, using textbooks from Belgrade. One of his students was Tasa Civković, a later Ottoman Serb patron. In the period of 1847–51, the Church of St. Nicholas in Kumanovo was built by the ktitors: ikonom priest Dimitrije, Krsto Puto and his son Denko Krstić, priest Neša, Hadži-Stojilković, and the families of Rikačovci, Šapkalijanci, Borozani and Stojanćeajini.

In 1860 ikonom Dimitrije and Denko Krstić were called to a hearing in Skopje by the Grand Vizier Mehmed Pasha Kibrizli, to be hanged, but paid for their release.

With the establishment of the Bulgarian Exarchate (1870), the status of the Serbs in Macedonia, who adhered to the Patriarchate of Constantinople (called Patriarchists), was greatly diminished. The Exarchate took over (seized) church properties of the Patriarchate, and the Serbs paid taxes for 7–8 years without any income, though they subsequently requested to be returned part of the tax from part of the seized properties which then stayed under the Bulgarians (Exarchists). Denko Krstić had built an ossuary, and a "decree confirmed that it belonged to the Serbs" (Patriarchists), thus the local church requested that it "must stay Serb" (Patriarchate). He was instrumental in securing the Kratovo nahija in continuing adherence to the Patriarchate of Constantinople, against the pressure of the Bulgarian Exarchate; he was the head of a group of Serb-orientated čorbadžije (rich merchants) which concluded with the head teacher in the nahija to terminate relations with the Exarchate, and reach agreement with Milovanović – which was done by the following year. This was criticized by the Bulgarian herald.

During the Serbian–Ottoman War (1876–78) he was claimed to have been a Serbian spy, reporting to the Serbian government about information on the Ottoman Army. He was involved in the Kumanovo Uprising (1878). After the death of priest Dimitrije (1880), Denko succeeded as the ikonom (manager) of the Kumanovo region. In late 1880, a letter of his was intercepted regarding the Brsjak Revolt, after which he was imprisoned. As a patron of Serbs in the Kumanovo region (and involvement in the uprisings), the military martial court in Pristina sentenced him to life imprisonment for high treason. He died in the Ottoman jail at Pristina on 16 June 1882. After his death, his work was continued by his son-in-law Dimitrije Nikolić.

He had a son, Đorđe (born 1868), the father of professor Dragaš Denković (1910–1999).

== See also ==
- Despot Badžović
- Serbs in North Macedonia
- List of people from Kumanovo

== Annotations ==
- His given name was Mladen (Младен), Denko being a diminutive. Although he wrote in his local dialect mixed with Serbian literary language, he constantly signed with -ov, as Krstov (Крстов).

== Sources ==
- Hadži-Vasiljević, Jovan (1909). Južna stara Srbija: istorijska, etnografska i politička istraživanja, knjiga prva. Nova stamparija Davidović. (e-book)
- Hadži-Vasiljević, Jovan (1930). Скопље и његова околина: историска, етнографска и културно политичка излагања. Штампарија "Св. Сава.

Religious titles
Preceded by Dimitrije Mladenović	Ikonom of Ecumenical Patriarchate of Constantinople in Kumanovo (1880–1882)	Succeeded by Dimitrije Nikolić
