= Teodosiy Dzhartov =

- Теодосий Джартов; Теодосиј Џартов

Mayor of Kumanovo
- In office 1941–1944
- Monarchs: Boris III; Simeon II
- Prime Minister: Bogdan Filov (1941–1943); Petar Gabrovski Acting (9–14 Sep 1943); Dobri Bozhilov (1943–1944)
- Preceded by: Trajko Loparski
- Succeeded by: Josif Andonov

Personal details
- Born: 1894 Kumanovo, Ottoman Empire
- Died: 14 January 1945 (aged 50–51) near Kumanovo, SFR Yugoslavia
- Party: Bulgarian Action Committees
- Occupation: Mayor
- Profession: Teacher, politician
- Known for: Collaborating with Bulgarian authorities

Teodosiy Dzhartov (Bulgarian: Теодосий Джартов, Macedonian: Теодосиј Џартов; 1894 – 14 January 1945) was a Bulgarian activist from Vardar Macedonia.

Dzhartov was a teacher in Kumanovo during the First World War Bulgarian occupation of parts from Kingdom of Serbia incl. Vardar Macedonia. During the Second World War Bulgarian occupation of parts from Kingdom of Yugoslavia in 1941, he participated in the Bulgarian Action Committees and later became a Mayor of Kumanovo. After the War, to wipe out the remaining Bulgarophile sentiments, the new Communist authorities persecuted the local Bulgarian nationalists with the charges of "great-Bulgarian chauvinism". He was executed by Yugoslav Partisans on 14 January 1945 near Kumanovo. Dzhartov was then 50 years old.

Government offices
Preceded by Trajko Loparski	Mayor of Kumanovo; 1941-1944	Succeeded by Josif Andonov

== See also ==
- Kumanovo
- List of mayors of Kumanovo
