= Proevce =

Proevce Проевце
- Village
- Location within North Macedonia
- Coordinates: 42.124233°N 21.741369°E
- Country: North Macedonia
- Region: Northeastern
- Municipality: Kumanovo

Population (2002)
  - Total: 2,311
- Time zone: UTC+1 (CET)
  - Summer (DST): UTC+2 (CEST)
- Car plates: KU
- Website: .

Proevce (Macedonian: Проевце) is a village in the municipality of Kumanovo, North Macedonia.

== Demographics ==
According to the 2002 census, the village had a total of 2311 inhabitants. Ethnic groups in the village include:

- Macedonians 2218
- Serbs 73
- Romani 18
- Others 2
