= Trajko Loparski =

Yugoslav politician

Mayor of Kumanovo
- In office February 1939 – November 20, 1940
- Monarch: Peter II
- Prime Minister: Dragiša Cvetković
- Governor: Aleksandar Andrejevikj
- Preceded by: Toma Gligorijevic
- Succeeded by: Teodosiy Dzhartov (Bulgaria)

Personal details
- Born: Трајко Лопарски; 1898 Kumanovo Kaza, Ottoman Empire
- Died: Unknown

Trajko Loparski (Macedonian Cyrillic: Трајко Лопарски) was a Mayor of Kumanovo, Kingdom of Yugoslavia before the Second World War started.

== Business ==
He owned "Stara Banja" restaurant in the village of Proevce. His descendants reopened the restaurant and named it after him.

== See also ==
- List of mayors of Kumanovo

Government offices
Preceded by Toma Gligorijevic	Mayor of Kumanovo; 1939-1940	Succeeded by Teodosiy Dzhartov
