= Kristijan Manević =

Macedonian basketball player

No. 15 – Kumanovo
- Position: Power forward
- League: Macedonian First League (basketball); Balkan International Basketball League

Personal information
- Born: November 5, 1987 (age 39)
- Listed height: 6 ft 6 in (1.98 m)
- Listed weight: 182 lb (83 kg)

Career information
- Playing career: 2009–present

Career history
- 2009–present: Kumanovo

Kristijan Manević (born November 5, 1987) is a Macedonian professional basketball player for KK Kumanovo of the Macedonian First League (basketball).
