= Ivan Babanovski =

Macedonian intelligence officer (born 1941)

Ivan Babanovski (Macedonian: Иван Бабановски) (born in 1941 in Kumanovo) is a Macedonian intelligence officer.

== Bibliography ==
Year	Macedonian Title	English Title
1982	Југославија како објект на специјалната војна	Yugoslavia as an object of special war
1984	Младината во системот на општествената самозаштита	Youth in the system of public self-protection
1986	Антисоцијалистички и антисамоуправни платформи	Anti-socialistic and anti-selfgoverned platforms
1990	CIA - Covert Action	
2002	ОНА Терористичка Паравојска во Македонија	ONA Terrorist Paramilitary in Macedonia
2006	Албанската мафија	Albanian mafia
2009	Портрети на Злосторници - Јасеновац Балкански Аушвиц *коавтор со Проф. Д-р. Самоил Садикарио - Коломонос	Portraits of criminals - Jasenovac the Balkan Auschwitz
2010	Оружје за масовна деструкција - Европа таргет	Weapons for mass destruction - Europe target
2014	Новинари и репортери како шпиони	Journalists and reporters as spies

== See also ==
- UDBA
- KOS
- MSSI
- ASC
- IA
