= Trajko Prokopiev =

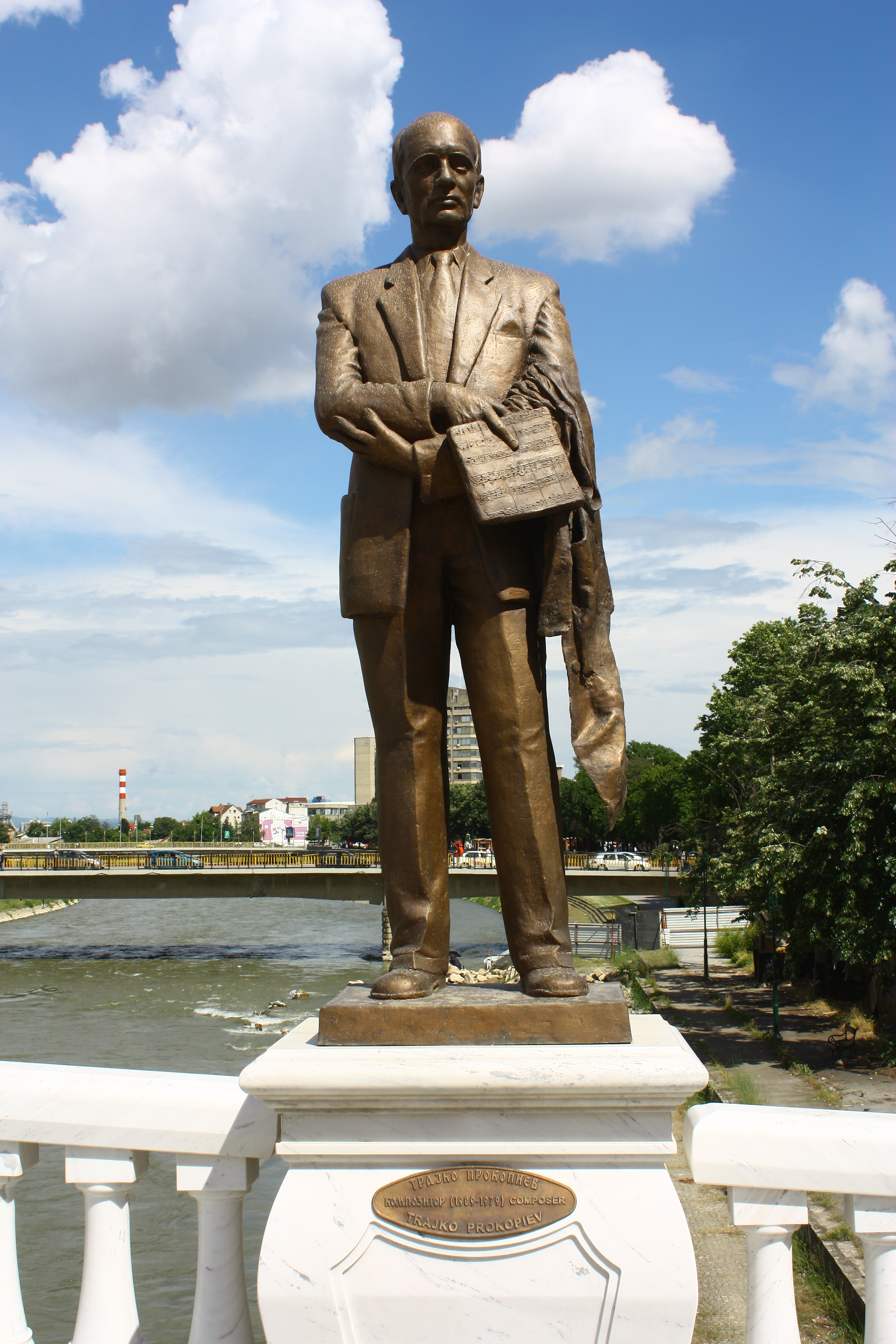
Prokopiev statue on the Bridge of Arts

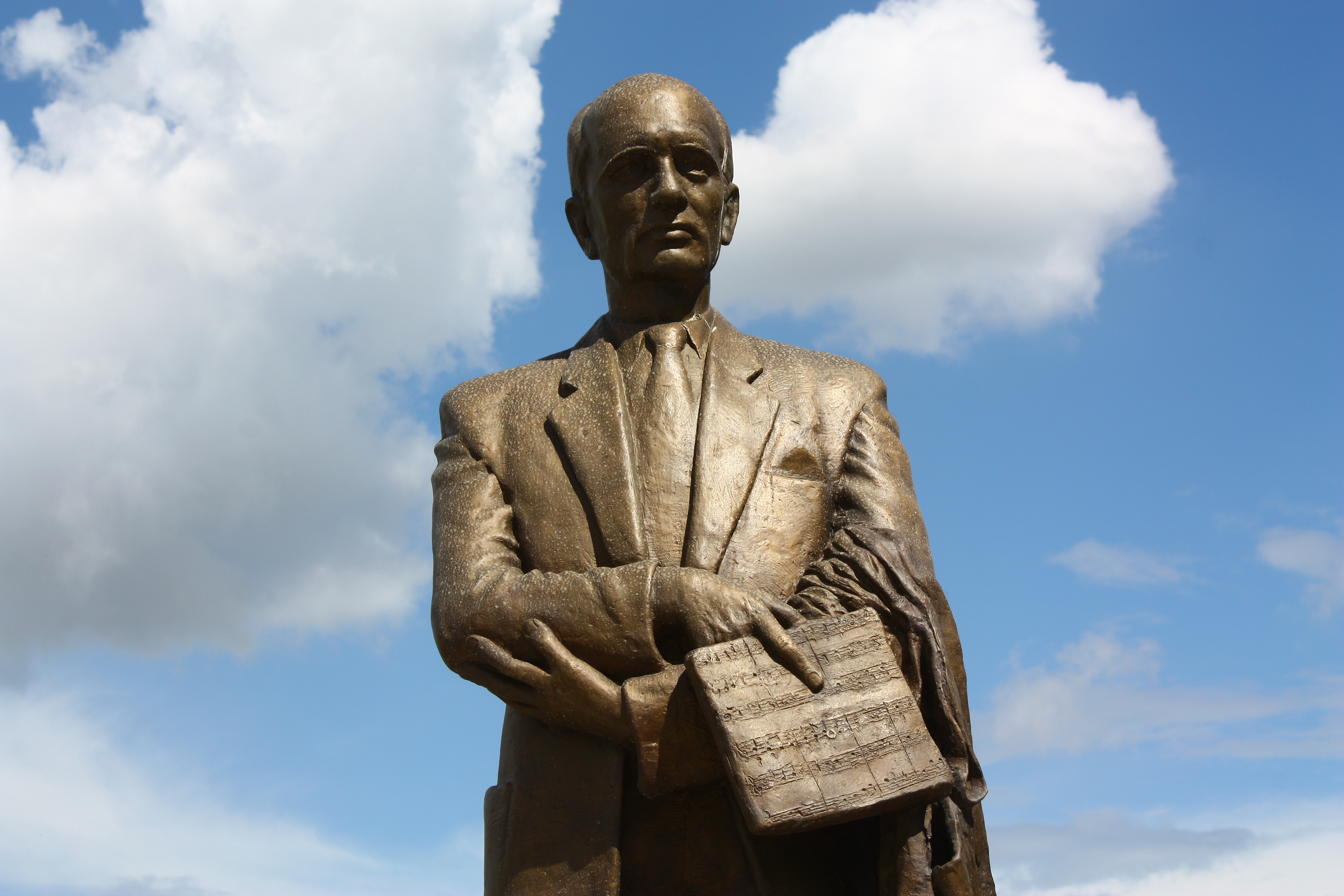
Prokopiev statue on the Bridge of Arts

Trajko Prokopiev (Macedonian: Трајко Прокопиев; 6 November 1909 – 21 January 1979) was a Yugoslav Macedonian composer.

== See also ==
- List of people from Kumanovo
