= Saltir Putinski =

Macedonian politician

- Салтир Путински
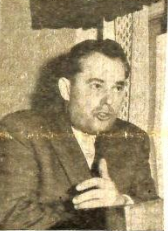

Mayor of Kumanovo
- In office 1951–1961
- Succeeded by: Jezdimir Bogdanski

Personal details
- Born: Kumanovo,
- Died: Kumanovo, Macedonia
- Party: Communist Party of Macedonia

Military service
- Allegiance: Yugoslavia
- Branch/service: Yugoslav Partisans / Kozjak partisan detachment
- Years of service: 1941–1945

Saltir Putinski (Macedonian: Салтир Путински) was a mayor of Kumanovo from 1951 to 1961. He was a member of the Kozjak partisan detachment.

== Public initiatives ==
=== Infrastructure ===
He was responsible for constructing the Lipkovo dam and hydro system, the railroad from Kumanovo to Beljakovce that has been in the process of reconstruction since 2014, industrialization of the city, and the development of mining and agriculture in the district.

== Bibliography ==
- Kumanovo and Kumanovo area in NOV 1941-1942 (materials of scientific gathering from 12, 13 and 14 December 1978)

== See also ==
- List of people from Kumanovo
- List of mayors of Kumanovo

Political offices
Preceded by ?	Mayor of Kumanovo; 1951–1961	Succeeded by ?
