= Vladimir Antonov (architect) =

- Владимир Антонов
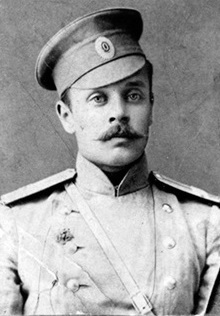
- Antonov, circa 1905
- Occupation: Architect
- Buildings: Zanaetchiski Dom; Banovinska Gradska Bolnica; Sokolana; Hotel Kumanovo; Church, Holy Trinity; Gradski Park

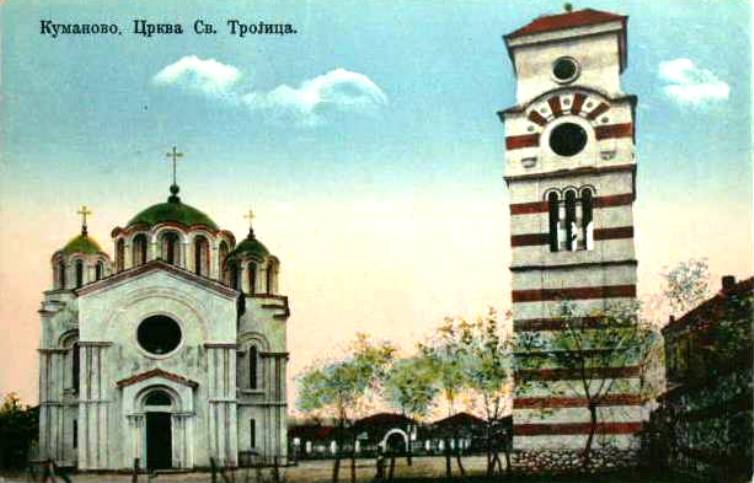
Church, Holy Trinity

Vladimir Antonov (Macedonian: Владимир Антонов) was a Russian architect who worked for most of his career in Kumanovo, Macedonia in the beginning of the 20th century. He was a member of the White Guardians and became a White émigré in the Kingdom of Yugoslavia. He was elected as municipal engineer in 1925 to implement the First Regulation Plan of Kumanovo from 1923.
