= Mirvan Xhemaili =

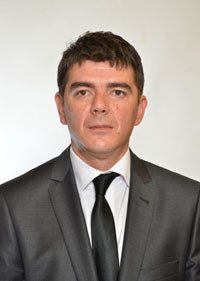
- Born: 6 October 1974 (age 51); Kumanovo, Macedonia
- Occupations: Politician, Member of Parliament
- Political party: Democratic Union for Integration - BDI

Mirvan Xhemaili (born 6 October 1974) in Kumanovo is a member of parliament in the Assembly of the Republic of Macedonia. He finished his primary education in Kumanovo, and secondary education in Gjilan. Faculty of English Language and Literature has finished in Tirana. A Masters in Political Science and Public Administration at the University of Southeast Europe (University). Meanwhile, he has completed his PhD at the University St. Cyril and Methodius in Skopje, where he won the title doctor of science of philology. He works as a professor of English since 2003 at the State University in Tetovo and the University.

== Autobiography ==
Member of DUI. PhD, Faculty of Philology, University "St. Cyril and Methodius", Skopje. University professor at the State University of Tetovo and the University of Eastern Europe since 2003 and an MP from Kumanovo, the area number 2. Activities in the Assembly: National European Integration Council member Committee for Agriculture, Forestry and Water, member Commission for Constitutional Affairs, deputy Commission for Culture, deputy Delegation to the Parliamentary Dimension of the Central European Initiative (CEI DG), member The delegation of the Parliament of the Republic of Macedonia to the Parliamentary Committee on Stabilization and Association, member Parliamentary Group of the Parliament of the Republic of Macedonia for Cooperation with the Parliament of the Islamic Republic of Iran, Member Parliamentary Group of the Parliament of the Republic of Macedonia for Cooperation with the Parliament of the Grand Duchy of Luxembourg, member

== Activities in the Assembly ==
National European Integration Council member Committee for Agriculture, Forestry and Water, member Commission for Constitutional Affairs, deputy Commission for Culture, deputy Delegation to the Parliamentary Dimension of the Central European Initiative (CEI DG), member The delegation of the Parliament of the Republic of Macedonia to the Parliamentary Committee on Stabilization and Association, member Parliamentary Group of the Parliament of the Republic of Macedonia for Cooperation with the Parliament of the Islamic Republic of Iran, Member Parliamentary Group of the Parliament of the Republic of Macedonia for Cooperation with the Parliament of the Grand Duchy of Luxembourg, member.
