= Bajrush Sejdiu =

Macedonian criminal

- Бајруш Сејдиу
- Born: September 19, 1968 (age 58); Kumanovo; SFRY (today: Macedonia)
- Citizenship: Macedonia
- Occupations: Crime Boss, gangster, racketeer
- Years active: 1990-2008
- Organization: Bajrush Gang
- Known for: Tobacco smuggling
- Successor: Nezimci Gang
- Spouse: Avdie Sejdiu
- Relatives: brother Naim Seferi cousin Ekrem Ameti
- Status: Arrested
- Allegiance: Bajrush Gang
- Convictions: 2
- Criminal charges: Money laundering, tobacco smuggling, violence, narcotics trade, illegal arms, extortion, bribery, fraud,
- Penalty: 5 years (2010); 11 years (2011)
- Reward amount: none
- Capture status: Imprisoned since 2008
- Wanted by: Law enforcement in the Republic of Macedonia
- Accomplices: (Kosovo) Remzi Ramani (distributor) (North Macedonia) Nove Nikolovski (bookkeeper) (North Macedonia) Fatmir Sulejmanov (security) (North Macedonia) Naim Seferi (distributor)

Bajrush Sejdiu (Macedonian Cyrillic: Бајруш Сејдиу) is a Macedonian criminal of Albanian descent who was arrested in the police action "Ash" in 2008. He was convicted and sentenced to 12 years in prison in 2011 for money laundering and violence in the "Ash 2" case. In his reign he owned several companies in Kumanovo: Tobacco factory, Zhito-Mel, Ken, Bibrok, Iskra, FC Milano, and Milano Arena. After his arrest around 200 workers list their jobs.
