= Agino Selo =

Agino Selo may refer to:

- Agino Selo, Banja Luka, Bosnia & Herzegovina
- Agino Selo, Kumanovo, North Macedonia
