= Battle of Šuplji Kamen =

1904 battle of the Macedonian Struggle

- Part of the Macedonian Struggle
Date	27 May 1904
Location	Šuplji Kamen, near Kumanovo, Ottoman Empire (modern-day North Macedonia) 42.103889°N 21.805278°E
Result	Ottoman victory

Belligerents
Serbian Chetnik Organization	(Ottoman Empire) Ottoman Army

Commanders and leaders
Anđelko Aleksić †	(Ottoman Empire) Hamdi Pasha

Strength
24	N/A

Casualties and losses
All dead	4 dead
- Location of Šuplji Kamen in North Macedonia

The Battle of Šuplji Kamen (Serbian: Borba na Šupljem Kamenu, Serbian Cyrillic: Борба на Шупљем Камену), fought between the Serbian Chetnik Organization and the Ottoman army under Hamdi Pasha, took place on 27 May 1904.

== Prelude ==
On 25 April, two bands (četa) of some 20 fighters under the voivodes Anđelko Aleksić and Đorđe Cvetković swore an oath in a ceremony of the Serbian Committee (Milorad Gođevac, Vasa Jovanović, Žika Rafajlović, Luka Ćelović and General Jovan Atanacković), with prota Nikola Stefanović holding the prayers. The Committee had prepared the formation of the first bands for a number of months. The Chetniks were sent for Poreče, and on 8 May they headed out from Vranje to Buštranje, which was then divided between Serbia and the Ottoman Empire.

== History ==
The Chetniks were escorted by Vasilije Trbić, who told them that the best way was to go through the Kozjak and then down to the Vardar. The two voivodes, however, wanted the fastest route, through the Kumanovo plains and then to Četirac. They managed to enter Turkish territory but were subsequently exposed in the plain Albanian and Turkish villages, and the Ottomans closed in on them from all sides, while they decided to stay on the Šuplji Kamen, which gave them little defence instead of meeting the army on the plains; in broad daylight, the Ottoman military easily poured bombs over the hill and killed all 24 of the Chetniks on 27 May.

According to Serbian state documents, the death toll was 24 Chetniks, a zaptı (Ottoman gendarmerie), and three Ottoman soldiers. Serbian deputy Ristić, according to the document, named Žika Rafajlović as the organizer of the band, and that "such adventures and thoughtless treacherous actions should be stopped".

== List of the dead ==
- Vojvoda Anđelko Aleksić of Midinaca
- Krsta Mihailović of Brezna near Tetovo
- Marko Veljković of Bukovljana near Kumanovo
- Đorđe Cvetković of Labuništa in Drimkol
- Manojlo Anastasijević of Elovec near Tetovo
- Micko Kuzmanović of Midinaca
- Milan Drndarević of Prilep
- Milutin Stojković of Jagodina
- Stevan Šutović of Kuča
- Koce Arizanović of Poreče
- Jovan Radosavljević of Ibarskog Kolašin
- Toma Vasiljević of Dragačeva
- Spira Pelivan of Tetovo
- Đorđe Jeleković of Vranje
- Spasa Janković of Vranje
- Proka Stojanović of Poreče
- Stojan Novaković of Poreče
- Bilan Čoković of Gostivar
- Gruja Stevković of Gostivar
- Mihajlo Kocić of Valjevo
- Đoše Kocević of Margara near Prilep
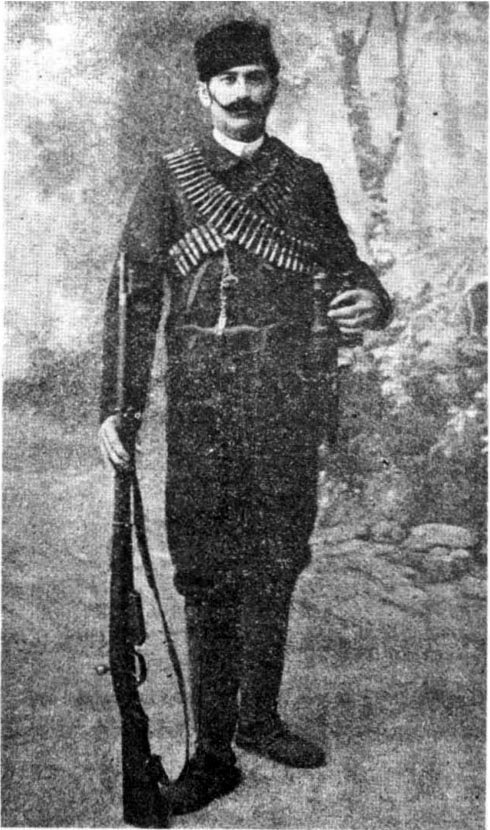
Vojvoda Anđelko Aleksić, from Midinci

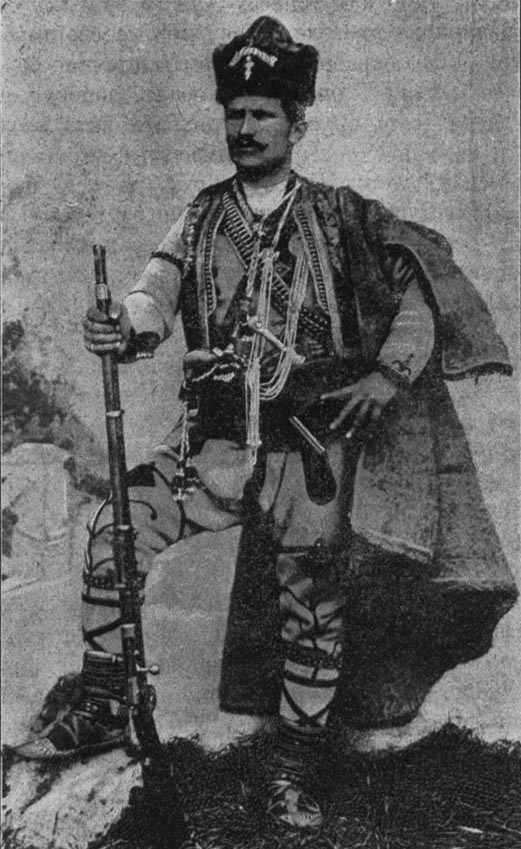
Manojlo Anastasijević-Bego, from Elovec near Tetovo

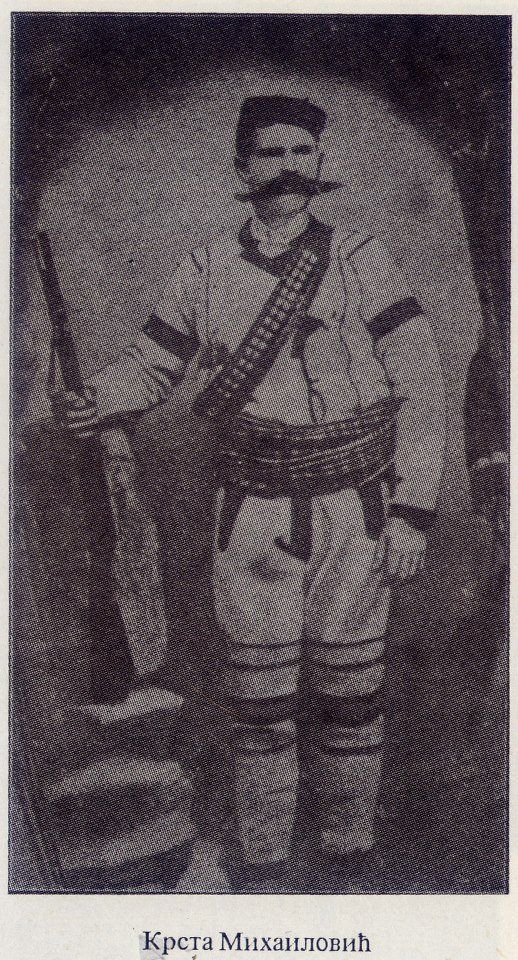
Krsta Mihailović, from Brezno near Tetovo

== Sources ==
- Krakov, Stanislav (1990) [1930]. Plamen četništva (in Serbian). Belgrade: Hipnos. pp. 150–164.
- Ilić, Vladimir (March 4, 2003). "Srpski četnici na početku dvadesetog veka (6): Pogibija na šupljem kamenu". Glas Javnosti. Archived from the original on November 10, 2014.
