= Anđelko Aleksić =

Macedonian Serb Chetnik commander

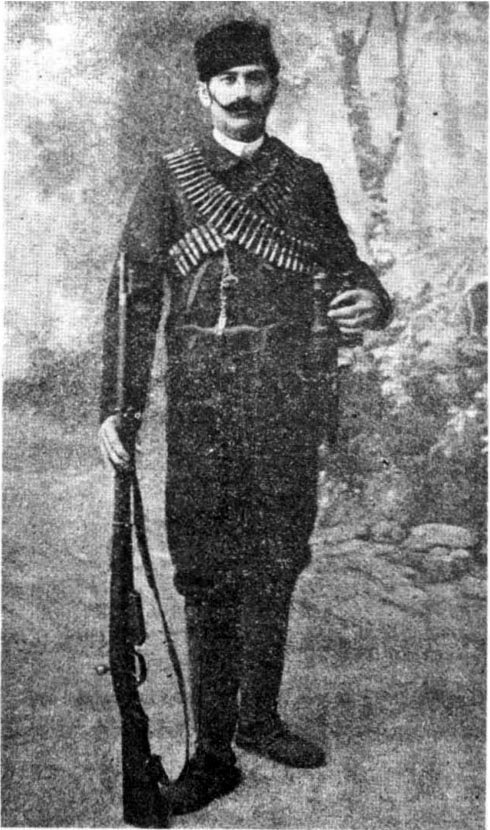
- Vojvoda Aleksić
- Born: 1876; Midinci, Ottoman Empire (now Kičevo Municipality, North Macedonia)
- Died: 27 May 1904 (aged 27–28); Šuplji Kamen, Ottoman Empire
- Military career
- Allegiance: Internal Macedonian Revolutionary Organization (1897–1903); Serbian Chetnik Organization (1903–1904)
- Service years: 1897–1904
- Rank: Voivode (Vojvoda)
- Conflicts: Macedonian Serb Struggle

Anđelko Aleksić (Serbian Cyrillic: Анђелко Алексић; 1876 – Četirce, Ottoman Empire, 27 May 1904) was a Macedonian Serb Chetnik commander (voivode). He and Đorđe Cvetković led the first two armed bands of the Serbian Chetnik Organization, sent from the Kingdom of Serbia into Ottoman Macedonia to fight for the liberation of Macedonia.

== Life ==
Anđelko Aleksić was born in Midinci, which at the time was part of the Ottoman Empire. He was a pečalbar (seasonal worker) in Belgrade, and had come since being a youngster. In 1897 he joined the Internal Macedonian Revolutionary Organization (IMRO), and he participated in the Ilinden Uprising (1903). After the uprising had been suppressed, Aleksić returned to wintering in Belgrade. He was working as a cook at the kafana (restaurant) called "Orient" at the beginning of the 20th century. When the revolutionary organization known as the Serbian Chetnik Organization was formed with the aim of liberation of Old Serbia (Kosovo) and Macedonia from the Ottoman Empire, he immediately joined the organization.

On 25 April 1904, two armed groups (četa) of some 20 fighters under voivodes Anđelko Aleksić and Đorđe Cvetković swore oath in a ceremony of the Serbian Chetnik Committee (Dr. Milorad Gođevac, Vasa Jovanović, Žika Rafailović, Luka Ćelović, Ljubomir Kovačević, Nikola Spasić and General Jovan Atanacković), with prota Nikola Stefanović holding the prayers. The Committee had prepared the formation of the first bands for several months.

The Chetniks were sent for Poreče, and on 8 May they headed out from Vranje, to Buštranje, which was divided between Serbia and Turkey. Vasilije Trbić, who guided them, told them that the best way was to go through the Kozjak and then down to the Vardar. The two voivodes, however, wanted the fastest route, through the Kumanovo plains and then to Četirce. They managed to enter Turkish territory but were subsequently exposed in the plain Albanian and Turkish villages, and the Ottomans closed in on them from all sides, and they decided to stay on the Šuplji Kamen, which gave them little defence instead of meeting the army on the plains; in broad daylight, the Ottoman military easily poured bombs over the hill and killed all 24 of the Chetniks (27 May 1904).

There was opposition to the Četnik Campaign, especially after the disaster of that first Aleksić četa. The Serbian press came out against the campaign and wrote that support of the četas should be forbidden from "sending people to the slaughterhouse." The Serbian Foreign Minister felt the Četnik Campaign would upset their delicate negotiations with the Ottoman Empire.

== Sources ==
- Krakov, Stanislav (1990) [1930], Plamen četništva (in Serbian), Belgrade: Hipnos
- Пешић, Миодраг Д. (2000). Стари четници. Kragujevac: Novi pogledi. "У чету је ступио међу првима, заправо када и Анђелко Алексић из околине Гостивара, који је држао ашчиницу у Сарајевској улици у Београду." [...] "...а вођство тог одреда преузео је Анђелко Алексић" (see also pogledi.rs/Одломак)
