= D'lga =

D'lga Д’лга
- Village
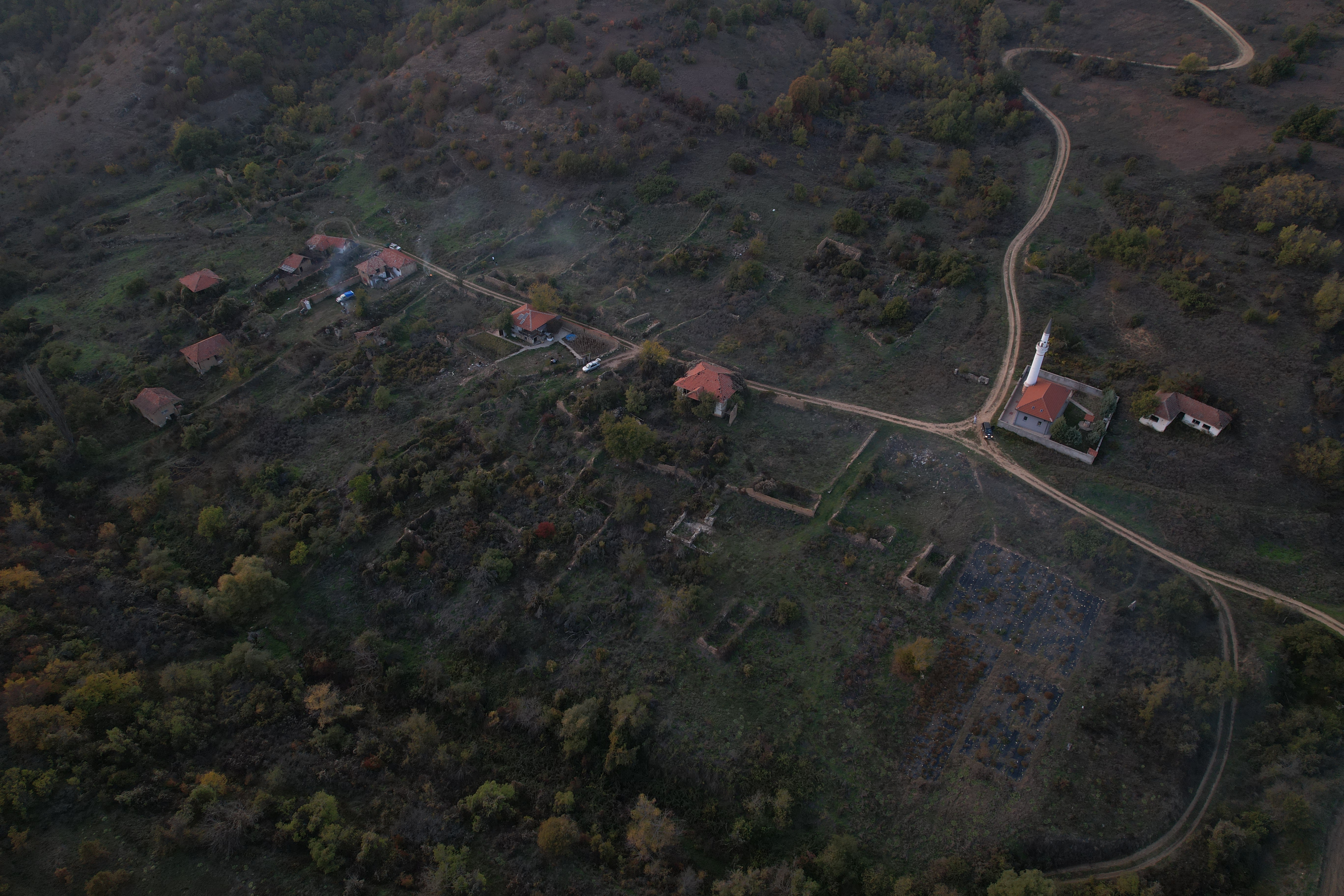
- Airview of the village

- Location within North Macedonia
- Coordinates: 42°00′22″N 21°47′00″E
- Country: North Macedonia
- Region: Northeastern
- Municipality: Kumanovo

Population (2021)
  - Total: 0
- Time zone: UTC+1 (CET)
  - Summer (DST): UTC+2 (CEST)
- Postal code: 1323
- Car plates: KU
- Website: .

D'lga (Macedonian: Д’лга) is an abandoned village in the municipality of Kumanovo, North Macedonia.

== Demographics ==
As of the 2021 census, D'lga had 0 residents.
