= Buštranje oil shale deposit =

Location
- Location: Buštranje, Pčinja District, Serbia

Production
- Products: Oil shale

The Buštranje oil shale deposit is an oil shale deposit located in Buštranje, Pčinja District, Serbia. The deposit has oil shale reserves amounting to 102 million tonnes, one of the largest oil shale reserves in Serbia and Europe and has an organic content equivalent to 2.5 million tonnes of shale oil.
