= Gabreš =

Gabreš Габреш
- Village
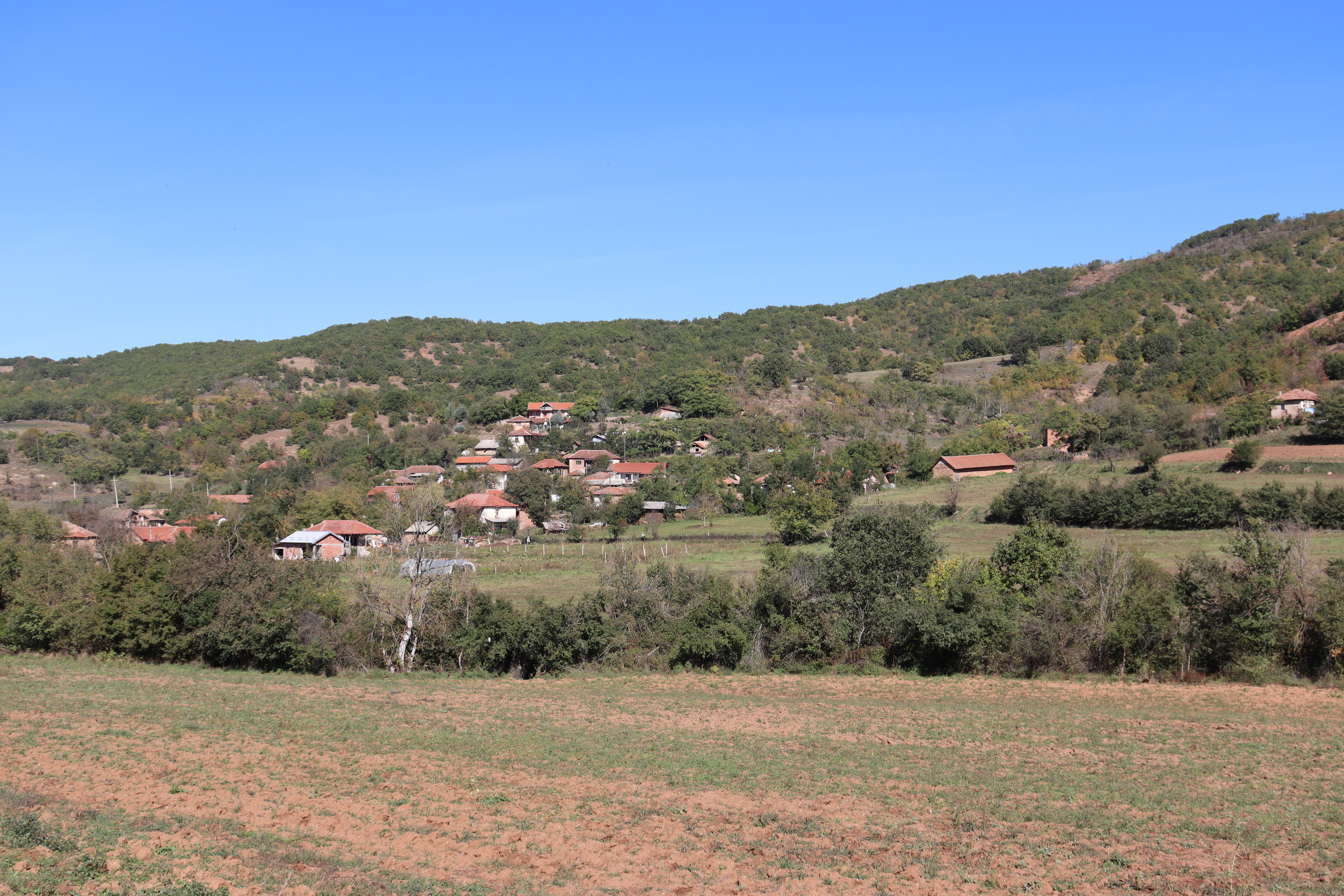
- View of the village

- Location within North Macedonia
- Coordinates: 42°05′09″N 21°51′24″E
- Country: North Macedonia
- Region: Northeastern
- Municipality: Kumanovo

Population (2021)
  - Total: 44
- Time zone: UTC+1 (CET)
  - Summer (DST): UTC+2 (CEST)
- Postal code: 1305
- Car plates: KU
- Website: .

Gabreš (Macedonian: Габреш) is a village in the municipality of Kumanovo, North Macedonia.

== Demographics ==
As of the 2021 census, Gabreš had 44 residents with the following ethnic composition:

- Macedonians 44
