= K'sanje =

K’sanje К’шање
- Village
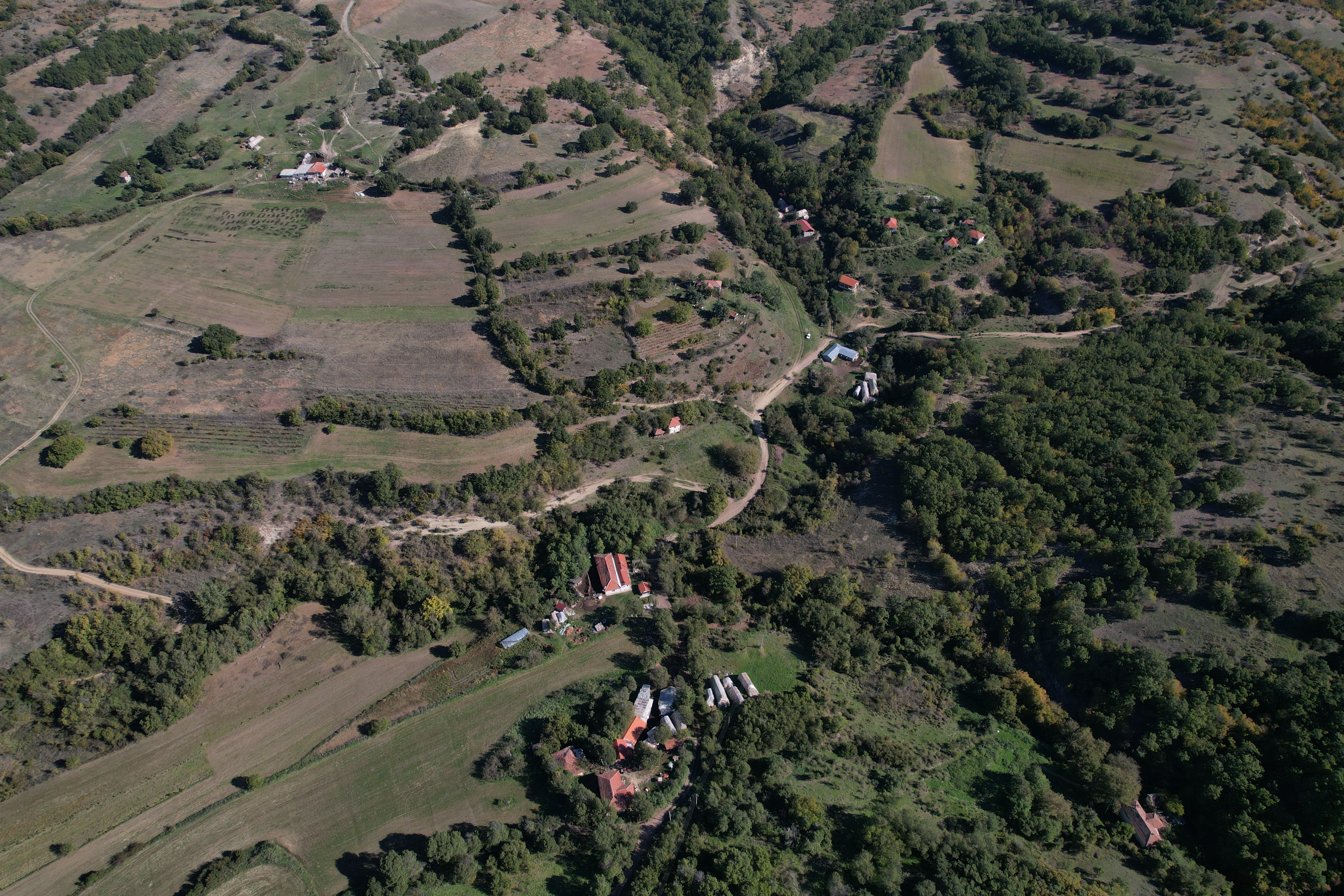
- Airview of the village

- Location within North Macedonia
- Coordinates: 42°01′44″N 21°56′35″E
- Country: North Macedonia
- Region: Northeastern
- Municipality: Kumanovo

Population (2021)
  - Total: 15
- Time zone: UTC+1 (CET)
  - Summer (DST): UTC+2 (CEST)
- Postal code: 1309
- Car plates: KU
- Website: .

K’sanje (Macedonian: К’шање) is a village in the municipality of Kumanovo, North Macedonia.

== Demographics ==
As of the 2021 census, K’sanje had 15 residents with the following ethnic composition:

- Macedonians 11
- Persons for whom data are taken from administrative sources 4
