= Coat of arms of Kumanovo =

Versions
- Version with single green tobacco leaf
- Armiger: none
- Adopted: 1996
- Crest: none
- Torse: none
- Shield: Spanish
- Supporter: none
- Badge: none
- Use: On Flag of Kumanovo

The coat of arms of Kumanovo is actually an emblem. Milosh Kostadinov in 1970 wrote an article on municipal heraldry and came to the conclusion that just seven municipalities in the Socialist Republic of Macedonia used a coat of arms, one of which was Kumanovo. The coat of arms has been changed since Macedonian independence from the former Yugoslavia.

In 2012 Jovan Jovanovski of the Macedonian Heraldic Society has described the current coat of arms as both "non-heraldic" and "quasi-heraldic". The Kumanovo coat of arms is placed on a so-called Spanish shield. The shield depicts a building (the Zanaetchiski dom), a statue of a woman from the Memorial Ossuary Kumanovo, a yellow sun, the year 1519 (when the name Kumanovo was found in a Turkish document), the name of the town in Cyrillic script and at the bottom a single yellow tobacco leaf, all against a red background.

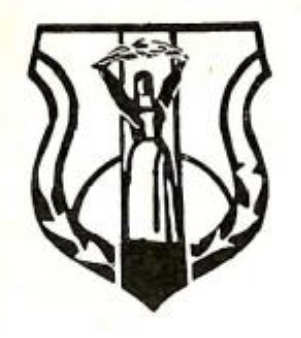
Kumanovo COA from 11.11.1968
