= Đorđe Cvetković =

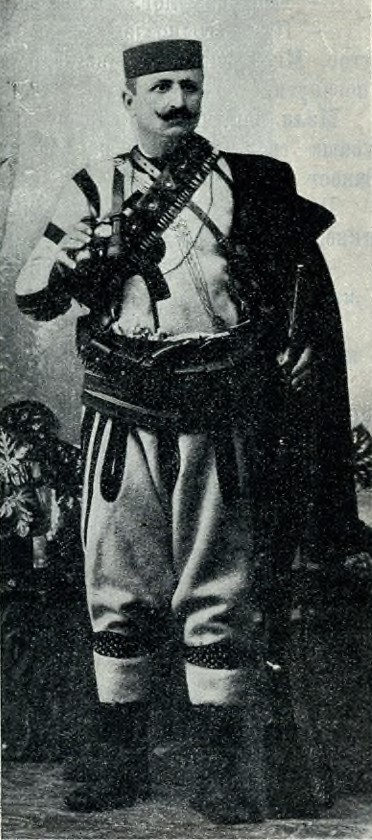
Vojvoda Drimkolski.

Đorđe Cvetković (Serbian Cyrillic: Ђорђе Цветковић; fl. 1903–d. 27 May 1904), known by the nom de guerre Drimkolski (Дримколски), was a Serbian Chetnik vojvoda (commander) of the četa (band) of Drimkol.

== Life ==
He was born in Labuništa, in Drimkol, in 1860. His father was a volunteer in the Serbian–Ottoman War (1876–78). He left his kafana, "Tri Gvozda", in Belgrade, and joined the Chetnik Organization. He and Anđelko Aleksić, with 22 freedom-fighters, swore oath before the Serbian Committee on 25 April 1904 before crossing the border over to Old Serbia. The Committee had prepared the formation of the first bands for a number of months. The Chetniks were sent for Poreče, and on 8 May they headed out from Vranje, to Buštranje, which was divided between Serbia and the Ottoman Empire. The Chetniks were escorted by Vasilije Trbić, who told them that the best way was to go through the Kozjak and then down to the Vardar. The two commanders however, wanted the fastest route, through the Kumanovo plains and then to Četirce. They managed to enter Turkish territory but were subsequently exposed in the plain Albanian and Turkish villages, and the Ottomans closed in on them from all sides. They decided to stay on the Šuplji Kamen, which gave them little defence instead of meeting the army on the plains; in broad daylight, the Ottoman military easily poured bombs over the hill and killed all 24 of the Chetniks on 27 May (see Fight on Šuplji Kamen).

== See also ==
- List of Chetnik voivodes

== Sources ==
- Đurić, Veljko Đ.; Mijović, Miličko (1993). Ilustrovana istorija četničkog pokreta. Narodna knj.
- Hadži-Vasiljević, Jovan (1928). Četnička akcija u Staroj Srbiji i Maćedoniji. Belgrade: Sv. Sava.
- Jovanović, Aleksa (1937). Spomenica dvadesetogodišnjice oslobodjenja Južne Srbije, 1912-1937 (in Serbian). Južna Srbija.
- Krakov, Stanislav (1990) [1930]. Plamen četništva (in Serbian). Belgrade: Hipnos.
- Krstić, A. (1930). "Наша четничка акција у Дримколу". Јужни преглед. 6–7. Skoplje.
- Trbić, Vasilije (1996). Memoari: 1898-1912 (in Serbian). Kultura. ISBN 9788678010132.
- Savić (1912). Krvave borbe srpskih četa po macedoniji i njihov rad od početka 1903 do danas. Savić.
