= Jačince =

Jačince Јачинце
- Village
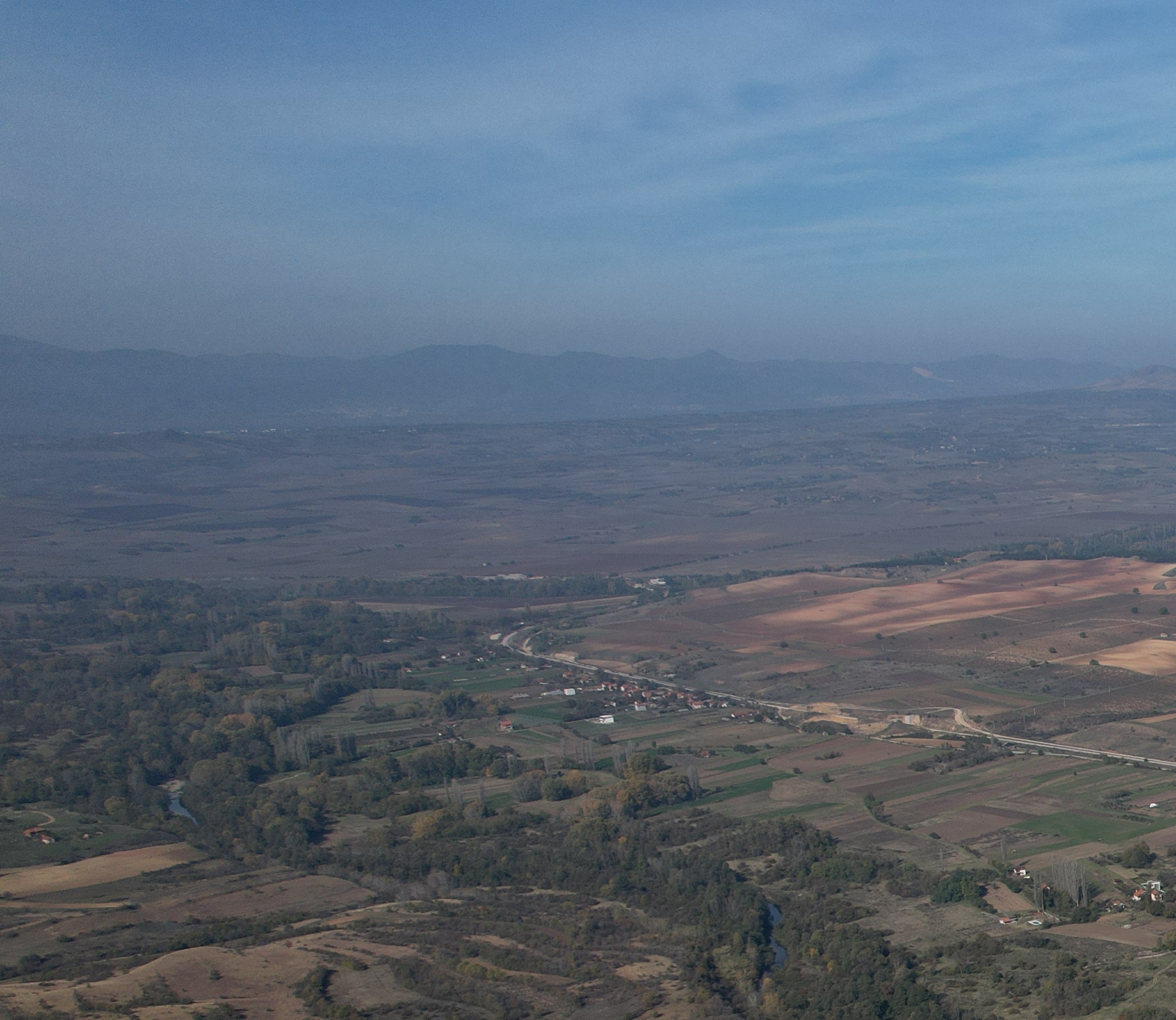
- Airview of the village

- Location within North Macedonia
- Coordinates: 42.096414°N 21.881963°E
- Country: North Macedonia
- Region: Northeastern
- Municipality: Kumanovo

Population (2002)
  - Total: 106
- Time zone: UTC+1 (CET)
  - Summer (DST): UTC+2 (CEST)
- Car plates: KU

Jačince (Macedonian: Јачинце) is a village in the municipality of Kumanovo, North Macedonia. It used to be part of the former municipality of Klečevce.

== Demographics ==
According to the 2002 census, the village had a total of 106 inhabitants. Ethnic groups in the village include:

- Macedonians 106
