= Karpoš, Kumanovo =

Karpoš Карпош
- Village
- Nickname: Рајкова куќа (La casa de Rajko)
- Location within North Macedonia
- Coordinates: 42.158074°N 21.742094°E
- Country: North Macedonia
- Region: Northeastern
- Municipality: Kumanovo

Population (2002)
  - Total: 5,433
- Time zone: UTC+1 (CET)
  - Summer (DST): UTC+2 (CEST)
- Car plates: KU
- Website: .

Karpoš (Macedonian: Карпош) is a neighbourhood in the municipality of Kumanovo, North Macedonia.

== Demographics ==
According to the 2002 census, the suburb had a total of 5433 inhabitants. Ethnic groups in the village include:

- Macedonians 4907
- Albanians 1
- Serbs 503
- Romani 14
- Others 8

Census year	Total	Macedonians	%	Albanians	Turks	Roma	Vlachs	Serbs	%	Bosniaks	Other
1948	--	--	--	--	--	--	--	--	--	--	--
1953	--	--	--	--	--	--	--	--	--	--	--
1961	--	--	--	--	--	--	--	--	--	--	--
1971	--	--	--	--	--	--	--	--	--	--	--
1981	2,479	2,317	93.47	0	0	0	0	156	6.29	--	6
1991	4,429	3,919	88.48	0	0	0	0	472	10.66	--	41
1994	4,540	4,080	89.87	0	0	0	0	454	10.00	--	6
2002	5,433	4,907	90.32	1	0	14	0	503	9.26	0	8
2021*	During the census 2021 census village was integrated as part of City of Kumanovo										
