= Memorial Ossuary Kumanovo =

Coordinates: 42.14540°N 21.72283°E

- Спомен костурница Куманово
- North Macedonia
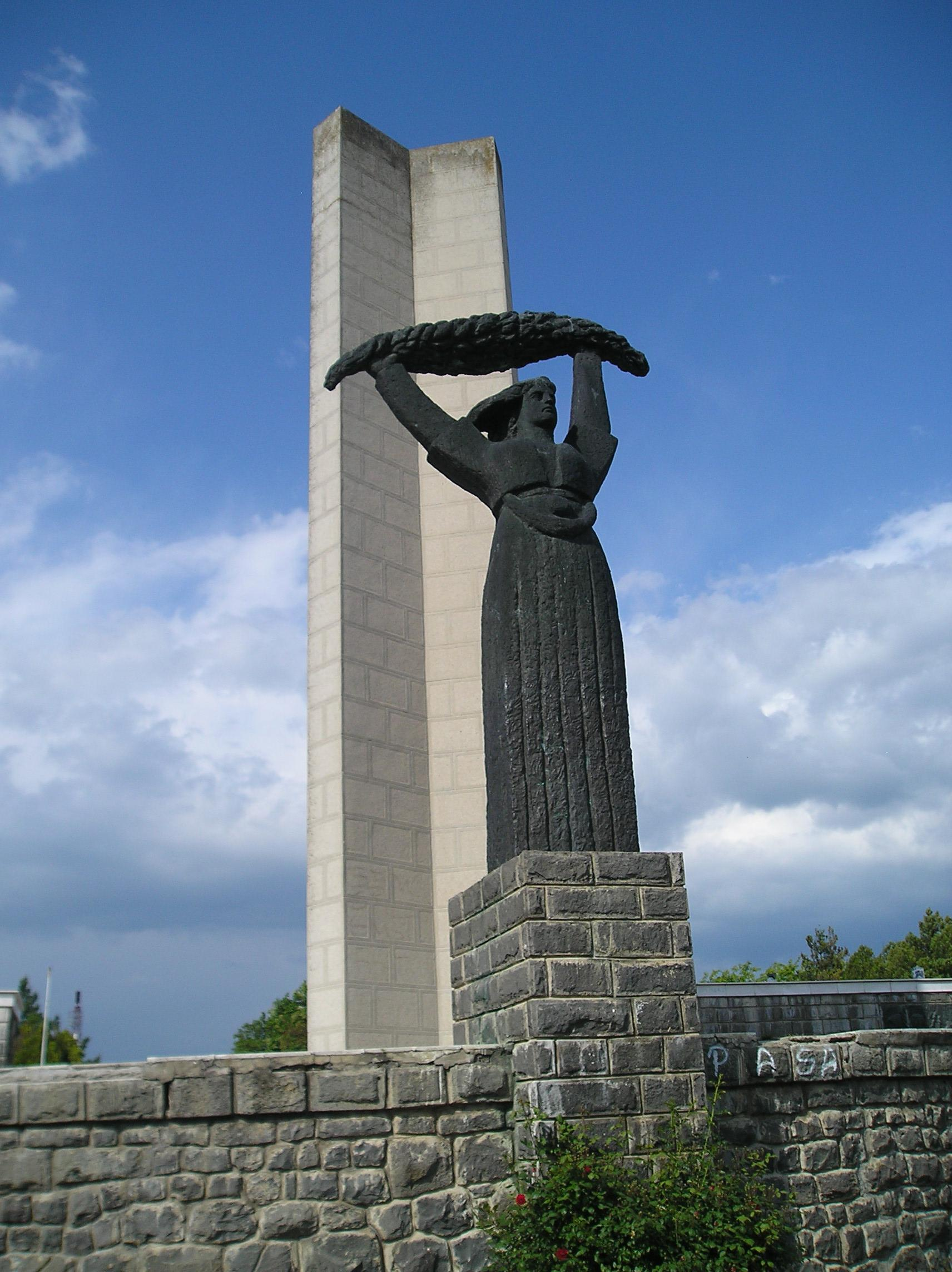
- Memorial Ossuary Kumanovo
- For World War II heroes
- Established: 1957
- Location: Kumanovo Municipality near Kumanovo, North Macedonia
- Designed by: Sreten Stojanović; Kosta Zordumis

Memorial Ossuary Kumanovo (Macedonian: Спомен костурница Куманово, romanized: Spomen kosturnica Kumanovo) is a memorial monument located in Kumanovo, North Macedonia. Itconsists of an obelisk and an ossuary containing the remains of communist guerrillas, killed during WWII in Kumanovo area.

== Events ==
Date/s	Type of event	Name of event	Est. Attendance	Artist/s	Country of origin
2013, 28–29 June	Festival	Revolution Festival	?	Skyrise, Foolish Green, Autmind, Flooder, GodDamn, Bad Copy	North Macedonia; Serbia
2014, 30–31 May	Humanitarian Concert	Moto Rock Fest	?	Overload, New deal, Crossroad Blues Bend, EP 10, Victims of Changes, Dani	North Macedonia; Serbia
