= Biljanovce =

Biljanovce Биљановце
- Village
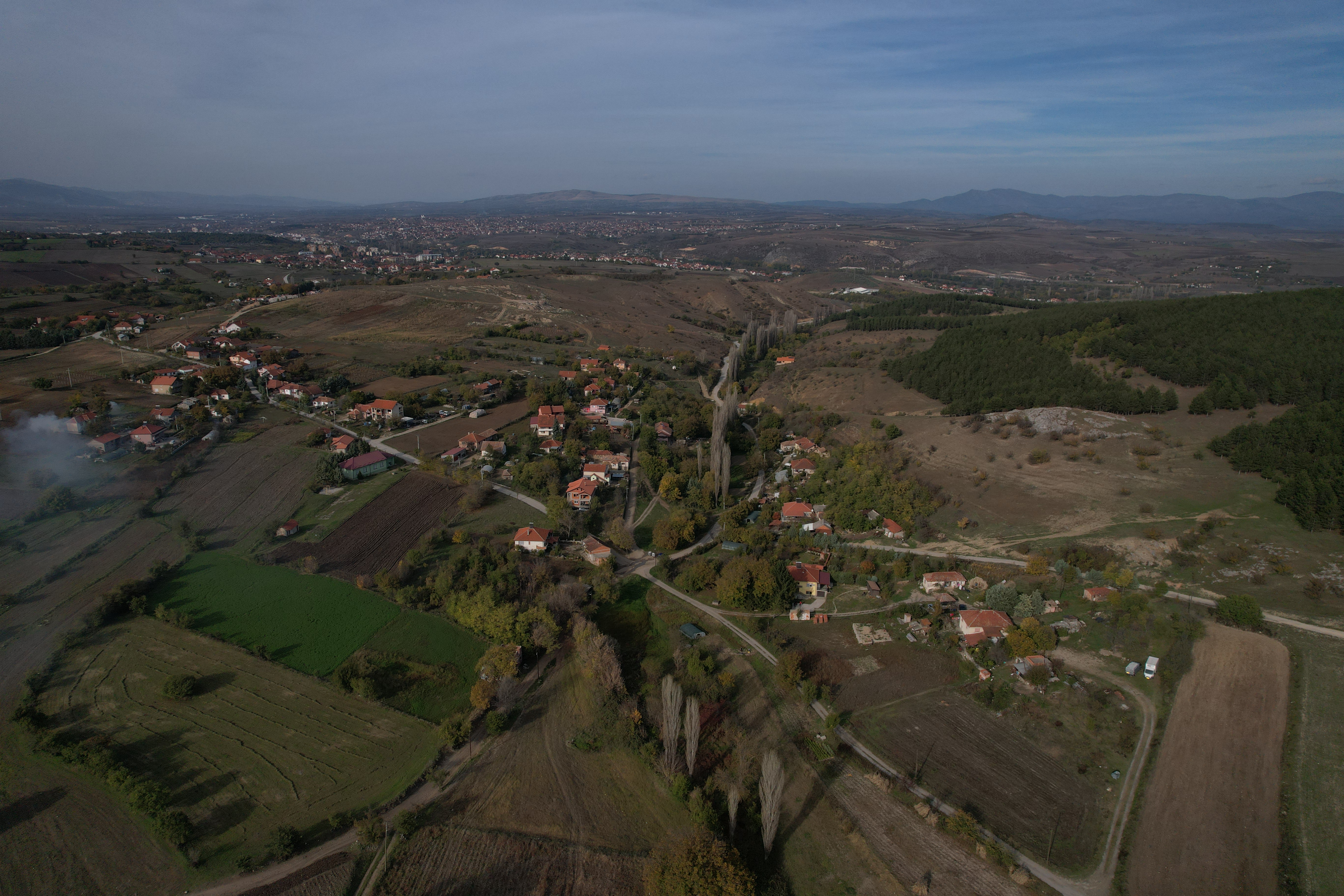
- Airview of the village

- Location within North Macedonia
- Coordinates: 42.106521°N 21.732577°E
- Country: North Macedonia
- Region: Northeastern
- Municipality: Kumanovo

Population (2021)
  - Total: 1,423
- Time zone: UTC+1 (CET)
  - Summer (DST): UTC+2 (CEST)
- Car plates: KU
- Website: .

Biljanovce (Macedonian: Биљановце) is a village in the municipality of Kumanovo, North Macedonia.

== Demographics ==
As of the 2021 census, Biljanovce had 1,423 residents with the following ethnic composition:

- Macedonians 1,251
- Persons for whom data are taken from administrative sources 117
- Serbs 40
- Others 15

According to the 2002 census, the village had a total of 1,231 inhabitants. Ethnic groups in the village include:

- Macedonians 1,203
- Serbs 24
- Others 4
