= List of municipalities in North Macedonia by population =

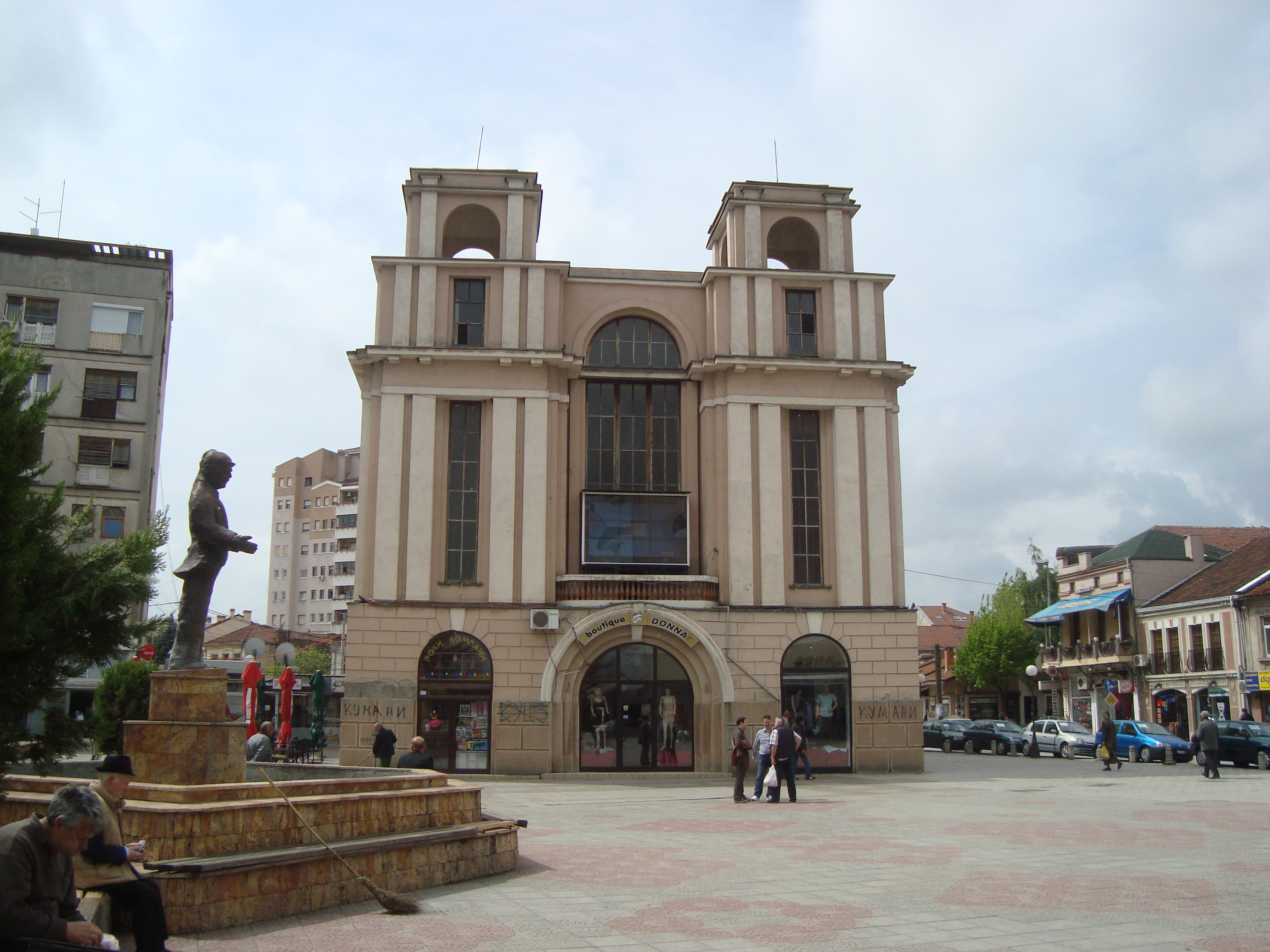
1 - Kumanovo

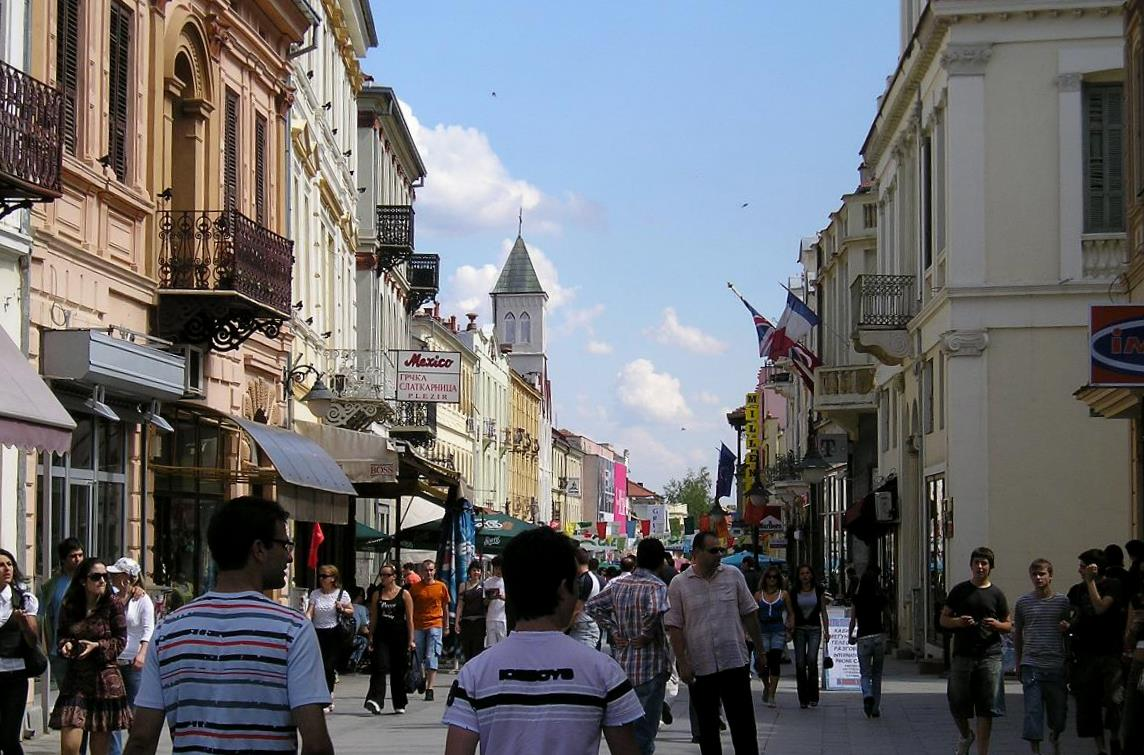
2 - Bitola

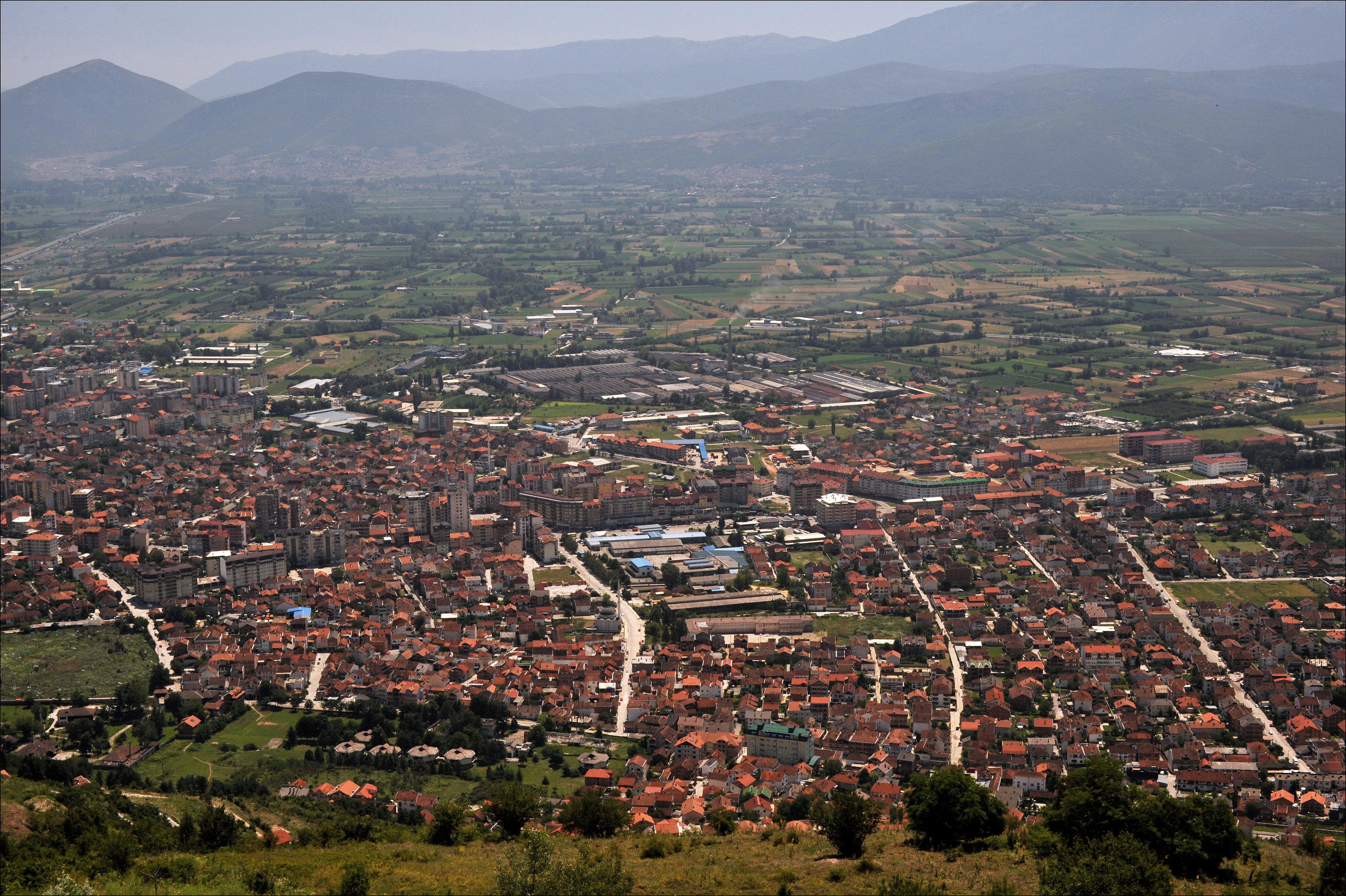
3 - Tetovo

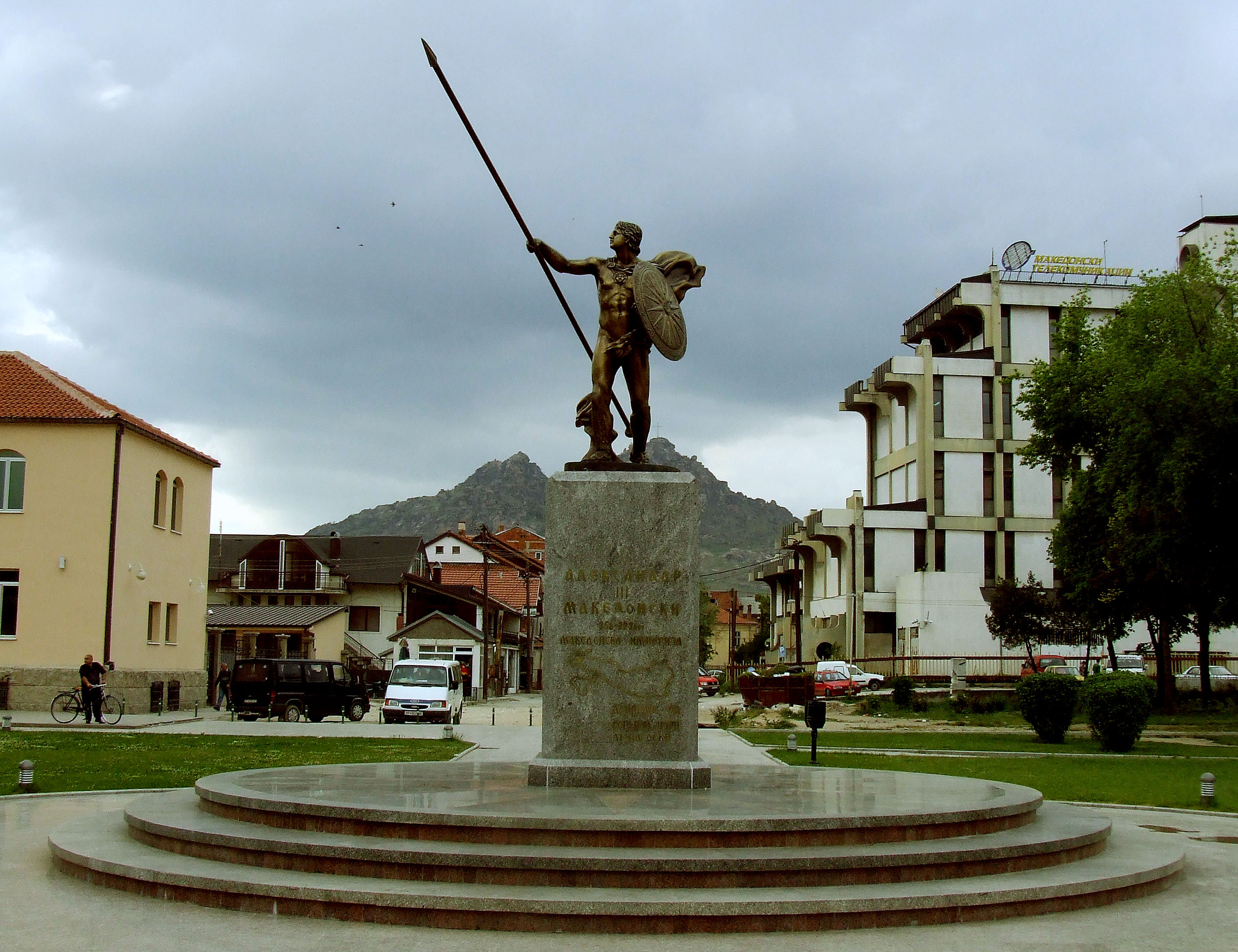
6 - Prilep

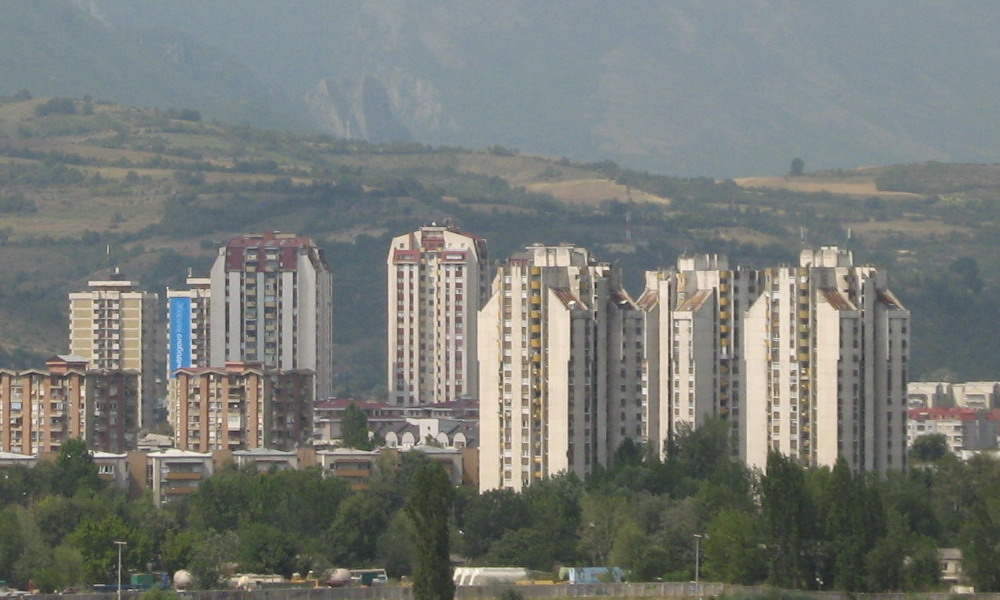
7 - Karpoš

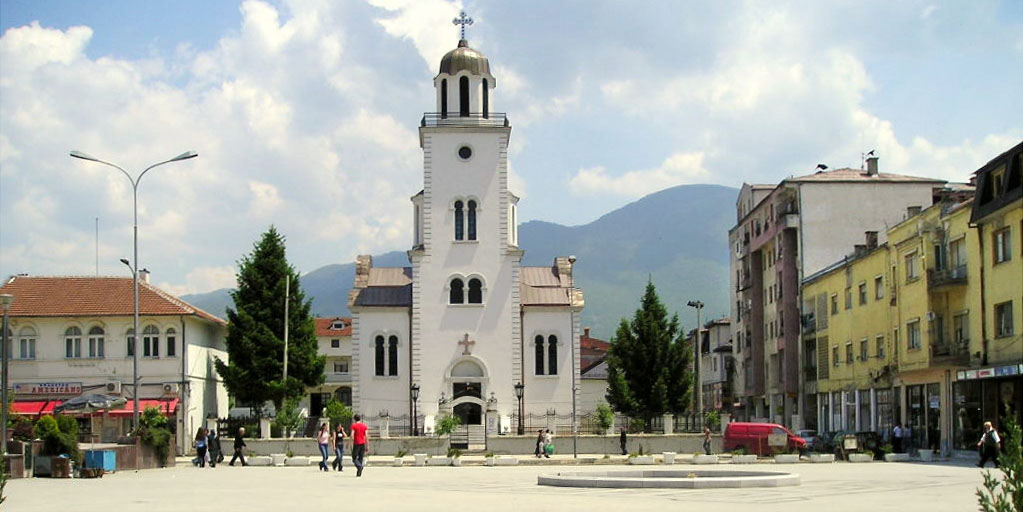
10 - Gostivar

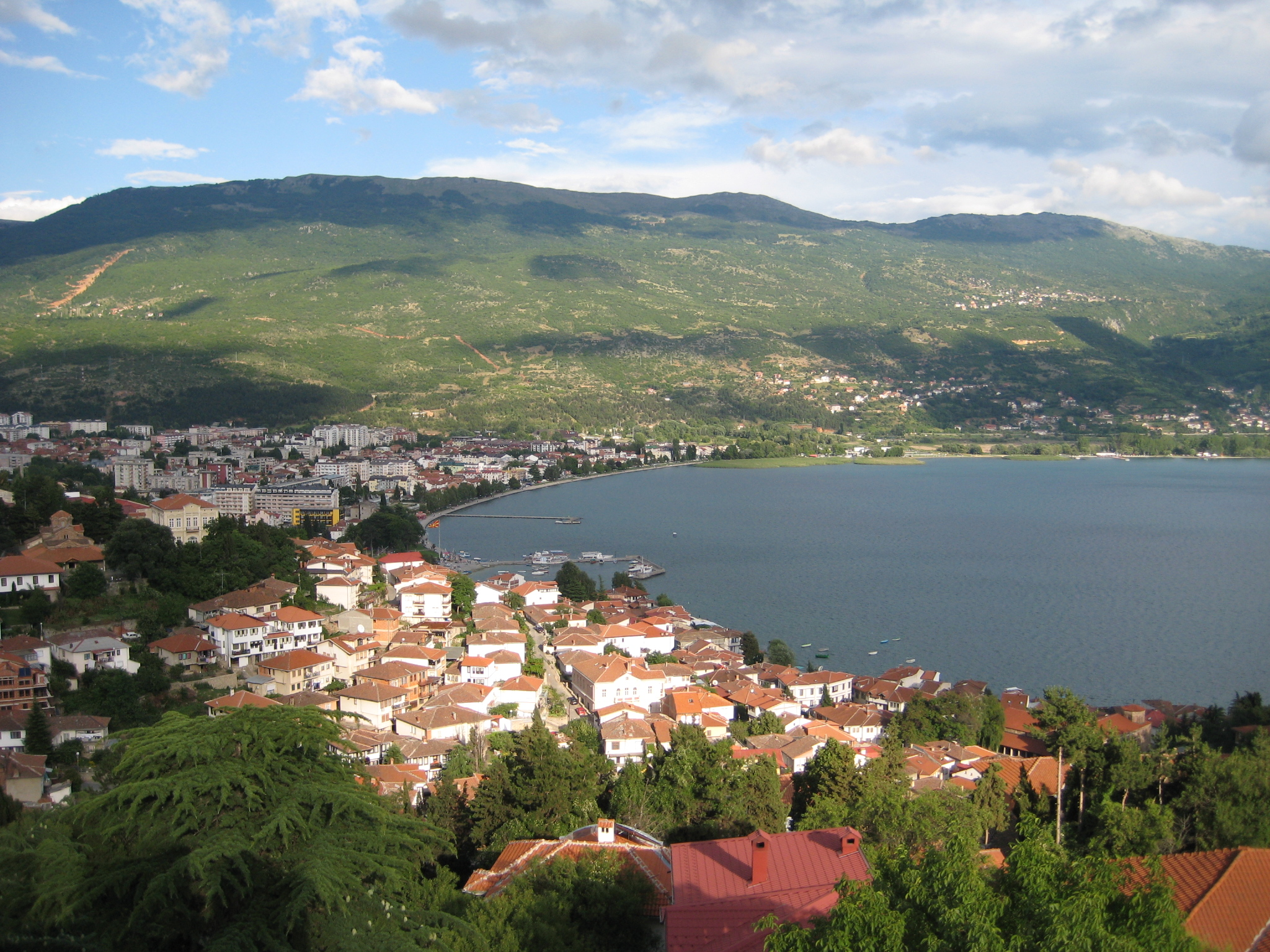
11 - Ohrid

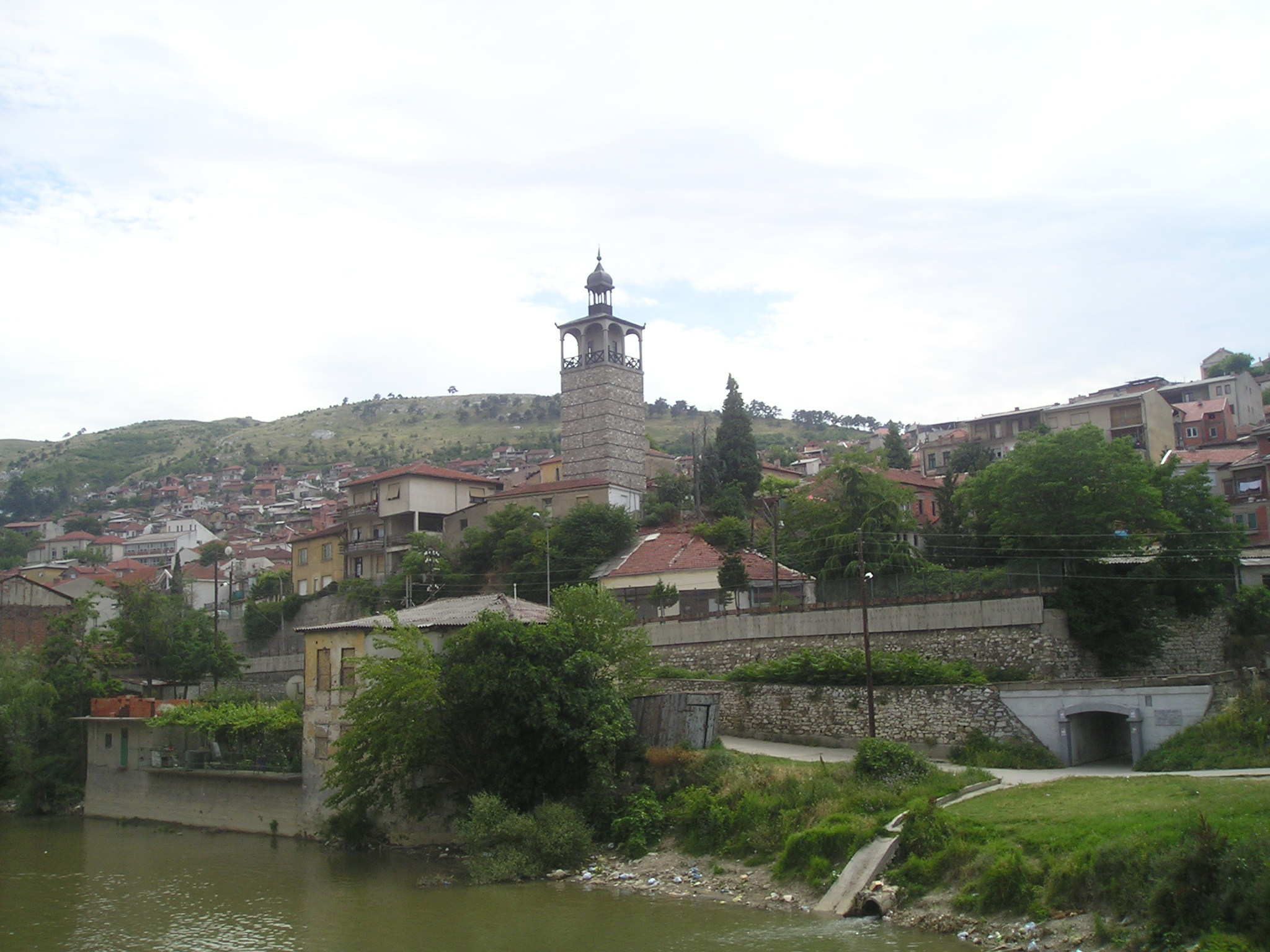
14 - Veles

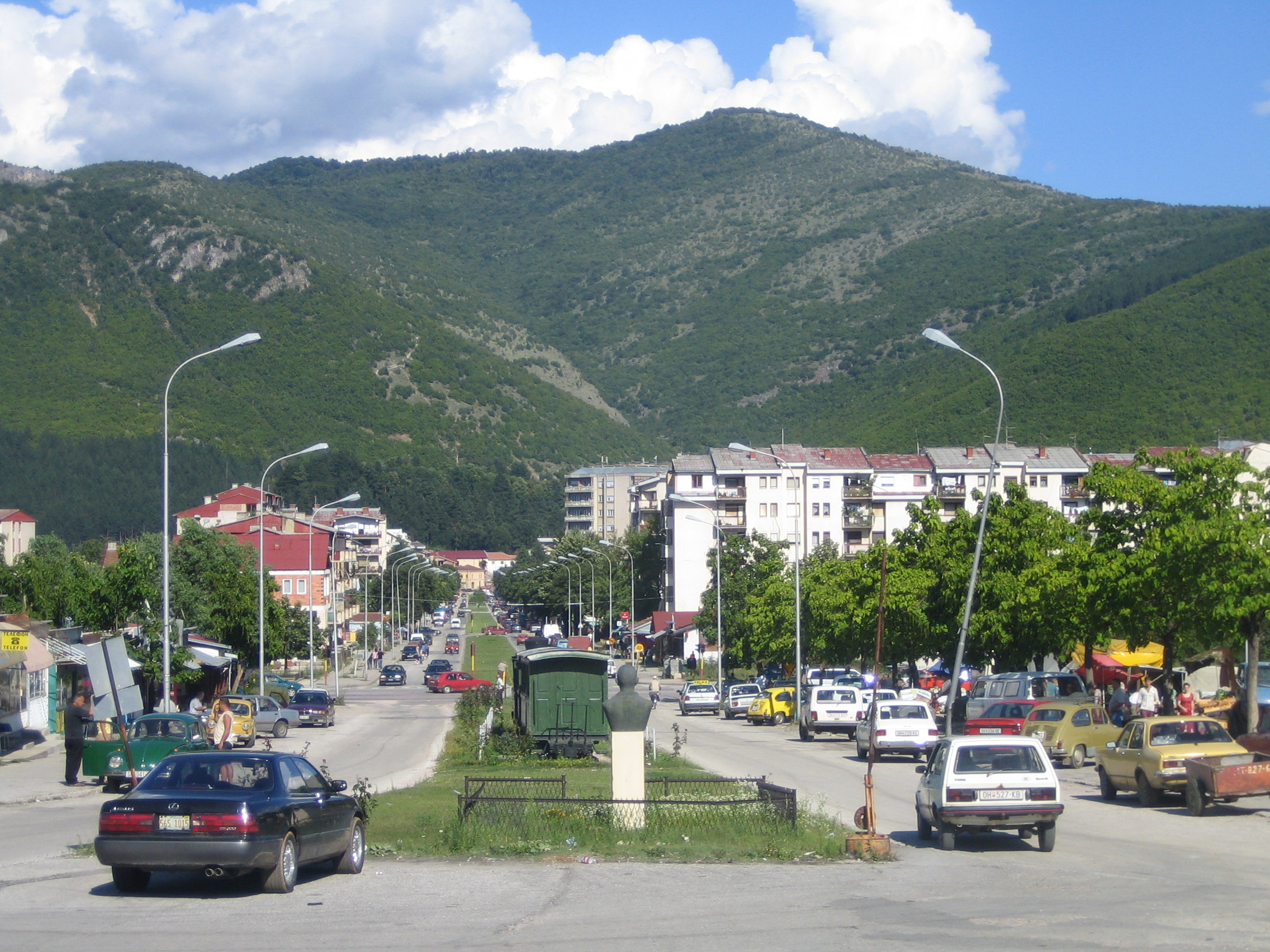
18 - Kičevo

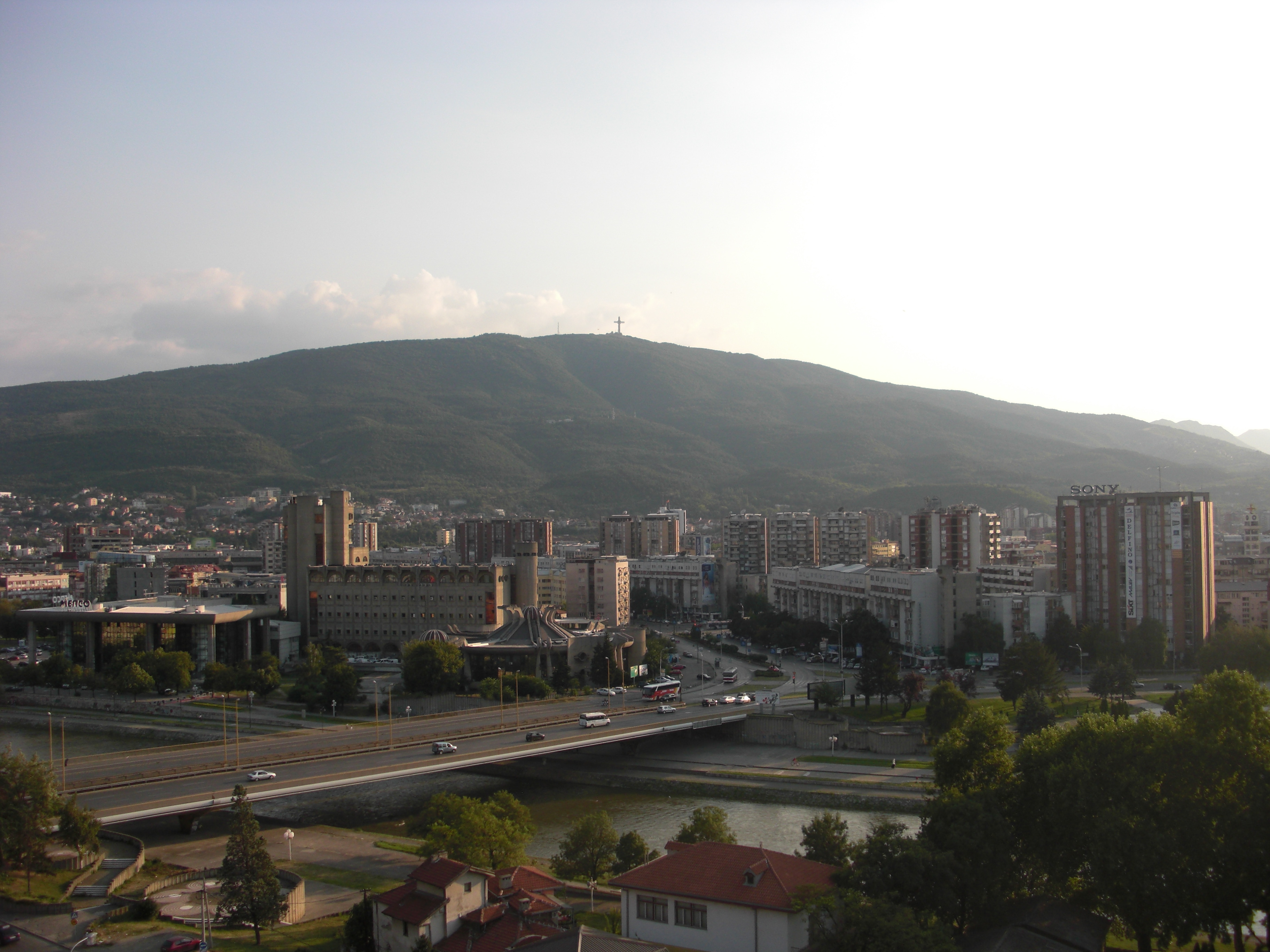
17 - Centar

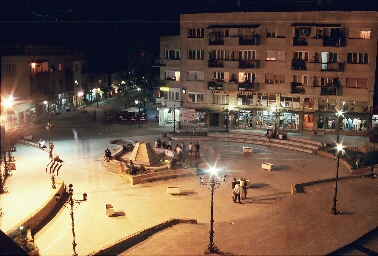
24 - Radoviš

The following is a list of the most populous municipalities in North Macedonia. The total population of North Macedonia in 2021 was 1,836,713.

== Municipalities over 20,000 population ==
North Macedonia is divided into 80 municipalities, out of which 34 have seats in cities or towns, 37 have seats in villages, and 10 make up Greater Skopje. The following lists municipalities in North Macedonia that have a population of at least 20,000.

Rank	Municipality	2002 census	2021 census	Skopje
1	Kumanovo	105,484	98,104	-
2	Bitola	95,385	85,164	-
3	Tetovo	86,580	84,770	-
4	Aerodrom	72,009	77,735	Greater Skopje
5	Gazi Baba	72,617	69,626	Greater Skopje
6	Prilep	76,768	69,025	-
7	Karpoš	59,666	63,760	Greater Skopje
8	Čair	64,773	62,586	Greater Skopje
9	Kisela Voda	57,236	61,965	Greater Skopje
10	Gostivar	81,042	59,770	-
11	Ohrid	55,749	51,428	-
12	Struga	63,376	50,980	-
13	Strumica	54,676	49,995	-
14	Veles	55,108	48,463	-
15	Štip	47,796	44,866	-
16	Gjorče Petrov	41,634	44,844	Greater Skopje
17	Centar	45,412	43,893	Greater Skopje
18	Kičevo	56,734	39,669	-
19	Saraj	35,408	38,399	Greater Skopje
20	Butel	36,154	37,968	Greater Skopje
21	Kavadarci	38,741	35,733	-
22	Kočani	38,092	31,602	-
23	Šuto Orizari	20,800	25,726	Greater Skopje
24	Radoviš	28,224	24,122	-
25	Bogovinje	28,997	22,906	-
26	Lipkovo	27,058	22,308	-
27	Studeničani	17,246	21,970	-
28	Gevgelija	22,988	21,582	-

== Population distribution ==
Population	No. of Municipalities
80,000-99,999	3
60,000-79,999	6
40,000-59,999	8
20,000-39,999	11
Under 20,000	52

== See also ==
- List of municipalities in North Macedonia
