= Tromegja =

Tromegja Тромеѓа
- Village
- Location within North Macedonia
- Coordinates: 42.133434°N 21.763857°E
- Country: North Macedonia
- Region: Northeastern
- Municipality: Kumanovo

Population (2021)
  - Total: 1,157
- Time zone: UTC+1 (CET)
  - Summer (DST): UTC+2 (CEST)
- Car plates: KU
- Website: .

Tromegja (Macedonian: Тромеѓа) is a village in the municipality of Kumanovo, North Macedonia.

== Demographics ==
As of the 2021 census, Tromegja had 1,157 residents with the following ethnic composition:

- Macedonians 757
- Serbs 389
- Persons for whom data are taken from administrative sources 34
- Others 7

According to the 2002 census, the village had a total of 1298 inhabitants. Ethnic groups in the village include:

- Macedonians - 692
- Serbs - 604
- Others - 2
