= Dolno Konjare =

Dolno Konjare Долно Коњаре
- Settlement
- Location within North Macedonia
- Coordinates: 42°09′50″N 21°42′42″E
- Country: North Macedonia
- Region: Northeastern
- Municipality: Kumanovo

Population (2002)
  - Total: 1,136
- Time zone: UTC+1 (CET)
  - Summer (DST): UTC+2 (CEST)
- Car plates: KU
- Website: .

Dolno Konjare (Macedonian: Долно Коњаре) is a village in the municipality of Kumanovo, North Macedonia.

== Demographics ==
According to the statistics of Bulgarian ethnographer Vasil Kanchov from 1900 the settlement is recorded as "Kojnare Dolno" as having 56 inhabitants, all Bulgarian Exarchists.

According to the 2002 census, the village had a total of 1286 inhabitants. Ethnic groups in the village include:

- Macedonians 669
- Serbs 516
- Albanians 91
- Romani 2
- Others 8
