= Karabičane =

- Village
- Location within North Macedonia
- Coordinates: 42°13′44″N 21°44′29″E
- Country: North Macedonia
- Region: Northeastern
- Municipality: Kumanovo
- Elevation: 549 m (1,801 ft)

Population (2002)
  - Total: 43
- Time zone: UTC+1 (CET)
  - Summer (DST): UTC+2 (CEST)
- Postal code: 1308
- Car plates: KU

Karabičane (Macedonian: Карабичане) is a village in northeastern North Macedonia, in the municipality of Kumanovo. According to the 2002 census, it had 43 inhabitants.

== Geography ==
The village is located in northernmost North Macedonia, close to the Serbian border (3 kilometres). To the nearest city, it is 12 kilometres north of Kumanovo. Karabičane is situated in the historical region of Žegligovo, in the highland, on ca. 550 m above sea. East of the village is the Rujen mountain.

The cadastral area of Karabičane borders Sopot to the north, Suševo to the northeast, Četirce to the southeast, and Tabanovce to the southwest.

== History ==
In the 19th century, it was part of the Ottoman kaza of Kumanovo. The village supported the Kumanovo Uprising (January 20–May 20, 1878). According to the statistics of Bulgarian ethnographer Vasil Kanchov from 1900 the village is recorded as Karabičani and as having 154 inhabitants, all Christian Bulgarians.

In 1905, the village was inhabited by 144 Serbs adherent to the Patriarchate of Constantinople.

== Demographics ==
According to the 2002 census, it had 43 inhabitants, the majority of whom declared as Serbs (86%), the rest as Macedonians (12%) and 1 Other. According to the 1994 census there were 51 Serbs and 2 Macedonians. The families are Eastern Orthodox Christian.
