= Čerkezi =

Čerkezi Черкези Çerkez
- Village
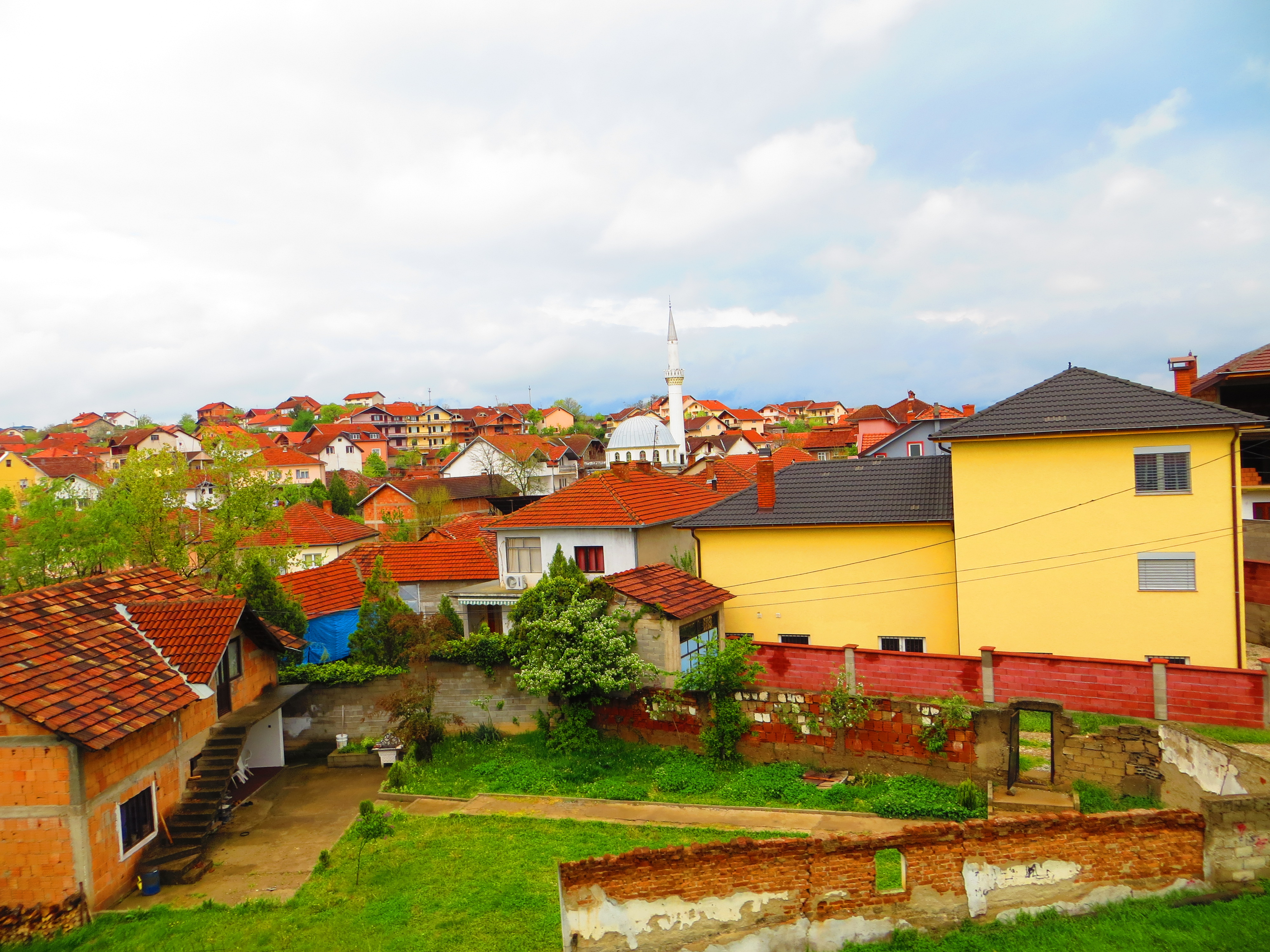
- View of the village

- Location within North Macedonia
- Coordinates: 42°07′N 21°41′E
- Country: North Macedonia
- Region: Northeastern
- Municipality: Kumanovo

Population (2021)
  - Total: 3,137
- Time zone: UTC+1 (CET)
  - Summer (DST): UTC+2 (CEST)
- Car plates: KU
- Website: .

Čerkezi (Macedonian: Черкези, Albanian: Çerkez) is a village in the municipality of Kumanovo, North Macedonia.

== Demographics ==
According to the statistics of Bulgarian ethnographer Vasil Kanchov from 1900 the settlement is recorded as Čerkezko Selo as having 120 inhabitants, all Circassians. As of the 2021 census, Čerkezi had 3,137 residents with the following ethnic composition:

- Albanians 3,027
- Persons for whom data are taken from administrative sources 99
- Turks 5
- Macedonians 3
- Others 3

According to the 2002 census, the village had a total of 3,741 inhabitants. Ethnic groups in the village include:

- Albanians 3,719
- Macedonians 2
- Bosniaks 4
- Others 16
