= Četirce =

- Village
- Location within North Macedonia
- Coordinates: 42°12′56″N 21°45′46″E
- Country: North Macedonia
- Region: Northeastern
- Municipality: Kumanovo
- Elevation: 566 m (1,857 ft)

Population (2002)
  - Total: 249
- Time zone: UTC+1 (CET)
  - Summer (DST): UTC+2 (CEST)
- Postal code: 1308
- Car plates: KU

Četirce (Macedonian: Четирце) is a village in northeastern North Macedonia, in the municipality of Kumanovo. According to the 2002 census, it had 249 inhabitants.

== Geography ==
The village is located in northernmost North Macedonia, close to the Serbian border (5 kilometres). To the nearest city, it is 10 kilometres north of Kumanovo. Četirce is situated in the historical region of Žegligovo, in the highland, on ca. 570 m above sea. Northeast of the village is the Rujen mountain.

The cadastral area of Četirce borders Gorno Konjare to the south, Tabanovce to the west, Karabičane to the northwest, Suševo to the north, and Nikuljane to the east (in Staro Nagoričane).

== History ==
In the 19th century, it was part of the Ottoman kaza of Kumanovo. The village supported the Kumanovo Uprising (January 20–May 20, 1878).

In 1905, the village was divided between Serb Patriarchists (276 individuals) and Bulgarian Exarchists (224 individuals). It had 500 inhabitants and two schools, one Bulgarian and one Serbian. There was Chetnik action there on 27 May 1904 in the Battle of Šuplji Kamen at Četirce, where voivode Anđelko Aleksić and all his men (24) perished at the hand of the Turks and their Albanian vassals. For Aleksić's death and others, Stevan Simić, a teacher at the Serbian schools in Manastir, Pljevlja, Skoplje and Thessaloniki, accused "the local Serbs from Kumanovo, who did not help this action, because they 'did not have a national organization (nisu imali narodnu organizaciju)'."

== Demographics ==
According to the 2002 census, it had 249 inhabitants, the majority of whom declared as Serbs (86%), the rest as Macedonians (14%). The families are Eastern Orthodox Christian.
