= Gorno Konjare =

Gorno Konjare Горно Коњаре Kojnare e Epërme
- Village
- Location within North Macedonia
- Coordinates: 42°10′55″N 21°43′40″E
- Country: North Macedonia
- Region: Northeastern
- Municipality: Kumanovo

Population (2002)
  - Total: 1,136
- Time zone: UTC+1 (CET)
  - Summer (DST): UTC+2 (CEST)
- Car plates: KU
- Website: .

Gorno Konjare (Macedonian: Горно Коњаре, Albanian: Kojnare e Epërme) is a village in the municipality of Kumanovo, North Macedonia.

== Demographics ==
According to the statistics of Bulgarian ethnographer Vasil Kanchov from 1900 the settlement is recorded as Kojnare Gorno as having 224 inhabitants, all Christian Bulgarians. According to the 2002 census, the village had a total of 1136 inhabitants. Ethnic groups in the village include:

- Macedonians 555
- Serbs 324
- Albanians 255
- Others 2
