= Agino Selo, Kumanovo =

Agino Selo Агино Село
- Village
- Location within North Macedonia
- Coordinates: 42.048058°N 21.680808°E
- Country: North Macedonia
- Region: Northeastern
- Municipality: Kumanovo

Population (2002)
  - Total: 965
- Time zone: UTC+1 (CET)
  - Summer (DST): UTC+2 (CEST)
- Car plates: KU
- Website: .

Agino Selo (Macedonian: Агино Село) is a village in the municipality of Kumanovo, North Macedonia.

== Demographics ==
On the 1927 ethnic map of Leonhard Schulze-Jena, the village shown as a Turkish village. According to the 2002 census, the village had a total of 965 inhabitants. Ethnic groups in the village include:

- Macedonians 954
- Serbs 10
- Others 1
