= Agino Selo, Banja Luka =

Agino Selo Агино Село (Serbian)
- Village (Selo)
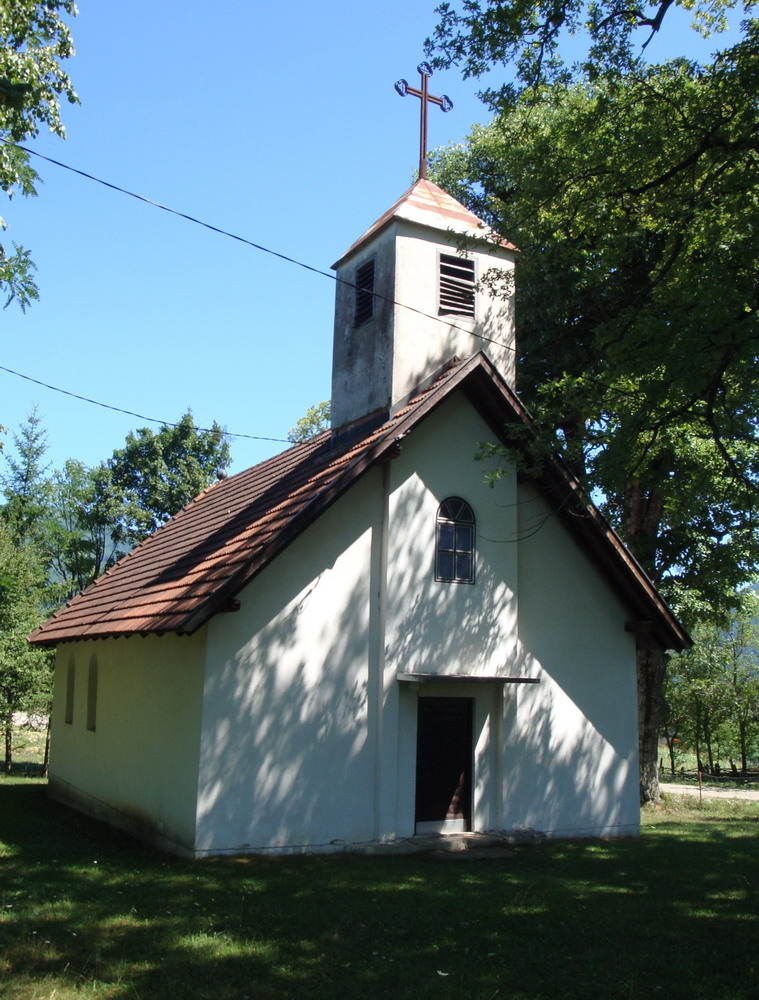
- Orthodox church in Agino Selo

- Location within Republika Srpska Location within Bosnia and Herzegovina
- Coordinates: 44°33′36″N 17°11′24″E
- Country: Bosnia and Herzegovina
- Entity: Republika Srpska
- Municipality: Banja Luka

Population (2013)
  - Total: 453
- Time zone: UTC+1 (CET)
  - Summer (DST): UTC+2 (CEST)

Agino Selo (Serbian Cyrillic: Агино Село) is a village in the municipality of Banja Luka, Republika Srpska, Bosnia and Herzegovina.

== Demographics ==
Ethnic groups in the village include:

- 449 Serbs (99.12%)
- 4 Others (0.88%)
