= Midinci =

Midinci Мидинци Milincë
- Village
- Location within North Macedonia
- Coordinates: 41°37′4″N 20°55′32″E
- Country: North Macedonia
- Region: Southwestern
- Municipality: Kičevo

Population (2021)
  - Total: 60
- Time zone: UTC+1 (CET)
  - Summer (DST): UTC+2 (CEST)
- Car plates: KI
- Website: .

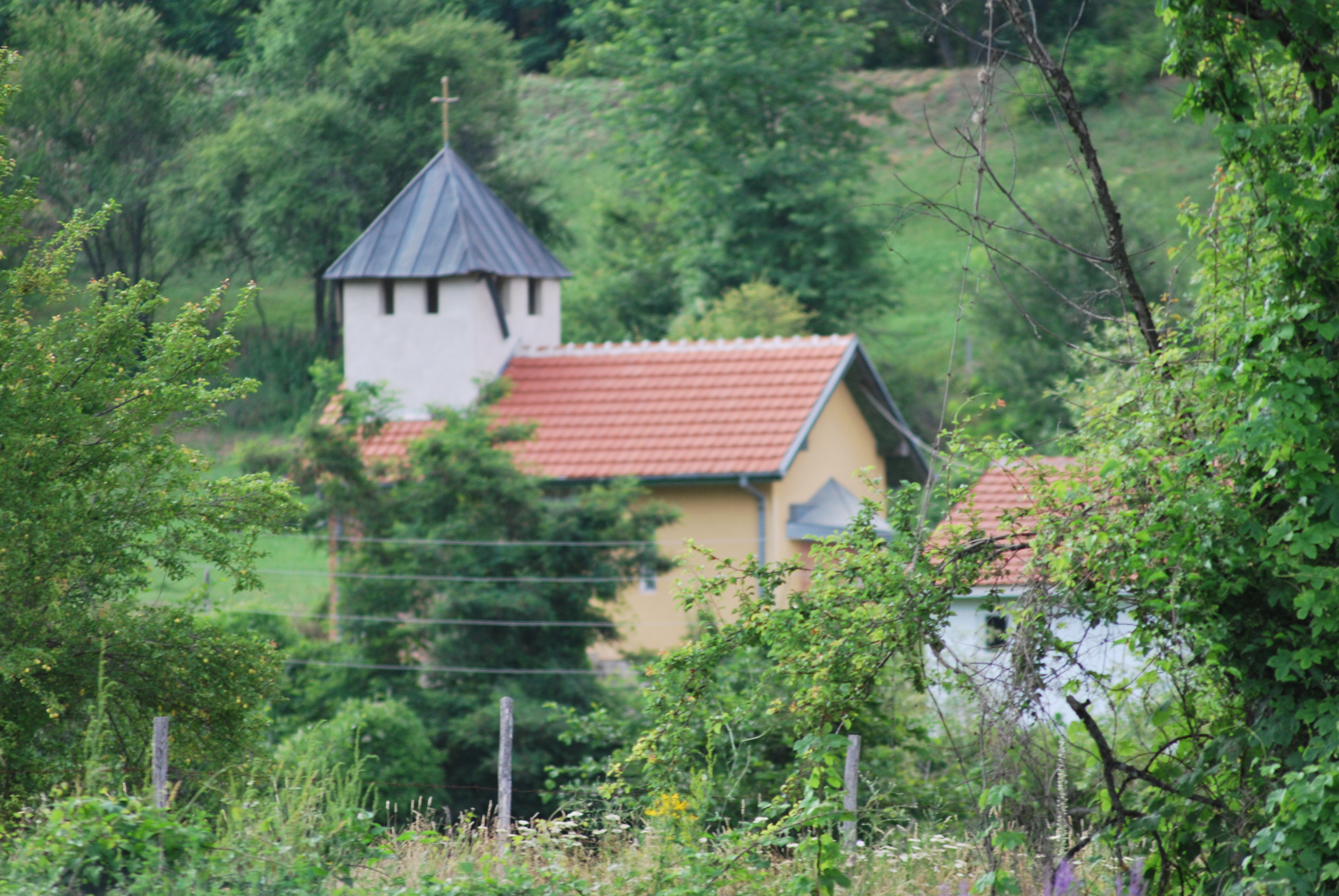
St. Petka Church in Midinci, Macedonia

Midinci (Macedonian: Мидинци, Albanian: Milincë) is a village in the municipality of Kičevo, North Macedonia. It used to be part of the former Zajas Municipality.

== Demographics ==
The village is attested in the 1467/68 Ottoman tax registry (defter) for the Nahiyah of Kırçova. The village had a total of 30 houses, excluding bachelors (mucerred).

As of the 2021 census, Midinci had 60 residents with the following ethnic composition:

- Macedonians 25
- Albanians 28
- Others 1
- Persons for whom data are taken from administrative sources 6
