= Klečevce =

Klečevce Клечовце
- Village
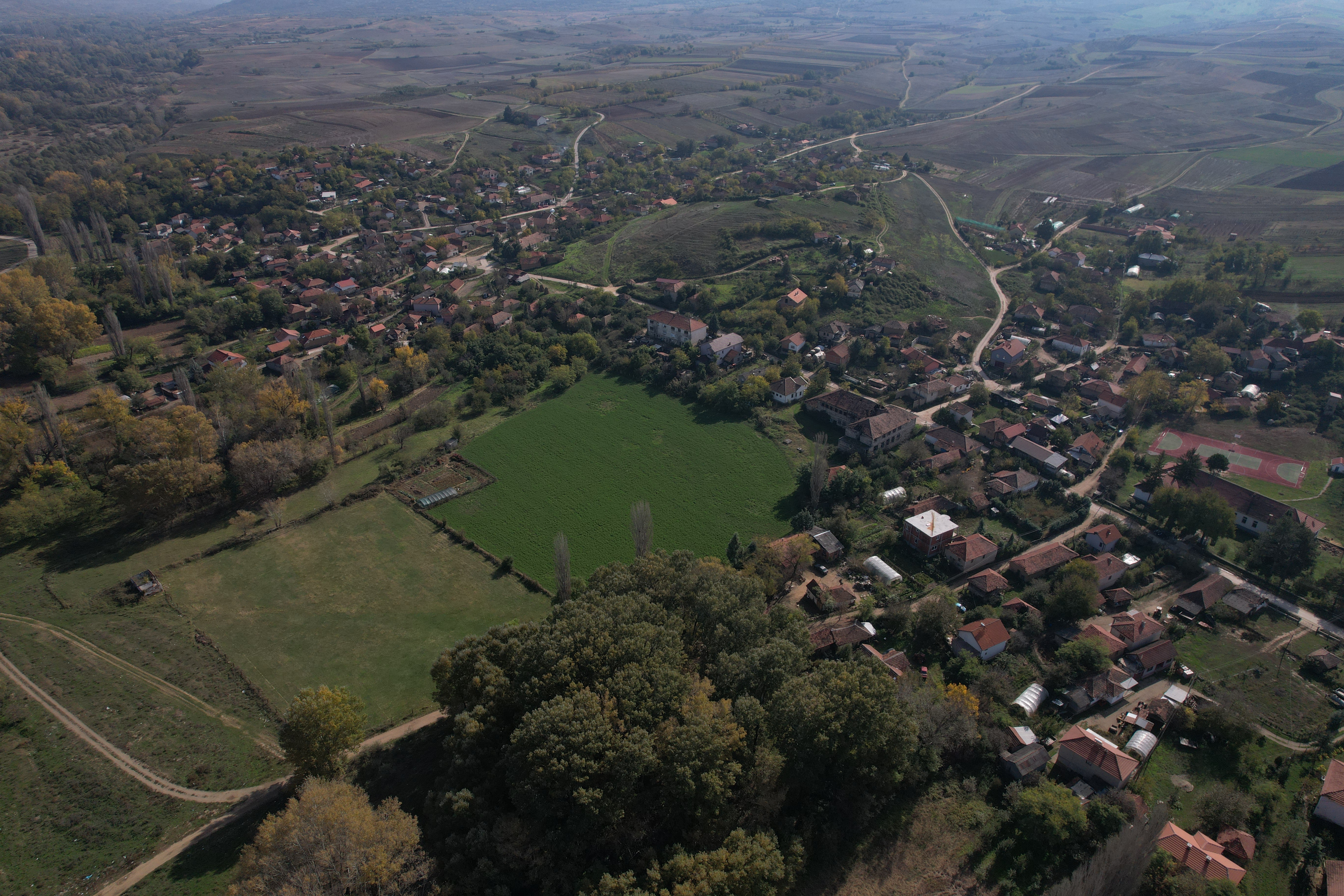
- Airview of the village

- Location within North Macedonia
- Coordinates: 42.116324°N 21.853728°E
- Country: North Macedonia
- Region: Northeastern
- Municipality: Kumanovo

Population (2002)
  - Total: 573
- Time zone: UTC+1 (CET)
  - Summer (DST): UTC+2 (CEST)
- Car plates: KU
- Website: .

Klečevce (Macedonian: Клечовце) is a village in the municipality of Kumanovo, North Macedonia. It used to be a municipality of its own.

== Demographics ==
According to the 2002 census, the village had a total of 573 inhabitants. Ethnic groups in the village include:

- Macedonians 555
- Serbs 17
- Others 1
