= Kumanovo Municipality =

Municipality of North Macedonia

Coordinates: 42.0894°N 21.7728°E

Municipality of Kumanovo Општина Куманово Komuna e Kumanovës
- Urban municipality
- Flag Seal

- Country: North Macedonia
- Region: Northeastern
- Municipal seat: Kumanovo

Government
  - Mayor: Maksim Dimitrievski (ZNAM)

Area
  - Total: 509.48 km^{2} (196.71 sq mi)

Population
  - Total: 98,104
  - Density: 207.04/km^{2} (536.2/sq mi)
- Time zone: UTC+1 (CET)
- Postal code: 1300
- Area code: 031
- Vehicle registration: KU
- Website: http://www.kumanovo.gov.mk

Kumanovo (Macedonian: Куманово [kuˈmanɔvɔ]; Albanian: Kumanovë) is a municipality located in the northern part of North Macedonia. Kumanovo is also the name of the city where the municipal seat is located. The Kumanovo Municipality is part of the Northeastern Statistical Region.

== Geography ==
The municipality has an area of 509.48 km² and borders the Lipkovo, Ilinden and Aračinovo Municipalities to the west, Serbia to the north, the Sveti Nikole and Petrovec Municipalities to the south, and Staro Nagoričane and Kratovo Municipalities to the east.

== History ==
Kumanovo as an inhabited area dates back to 1519. The most detailed data comes from Evliya Çelebi, who traveled to the region. The area was inhabited by 52 families and 300 residents. After the Karposh Uprising in 1689, Kumanovo entered a period of stagnation. After 1945, Kumanovo experienced fast economic, administrative and cultural development.

By the 2003 territorial division of the Republic, the Orašac Municipality was merged with Kumanovo, as was a part of the rural Klečevce Municipality. The other part of Klečevce was annexed to the Staro Nagoričane Municipality.

== Demographics ==
Kumanovo had 94,589 inhabitants in 1994 and 98,104 in the last national census. The present-day municipality has 98,104 inhabitants, which makes it the most populous municipality in Macedonia.

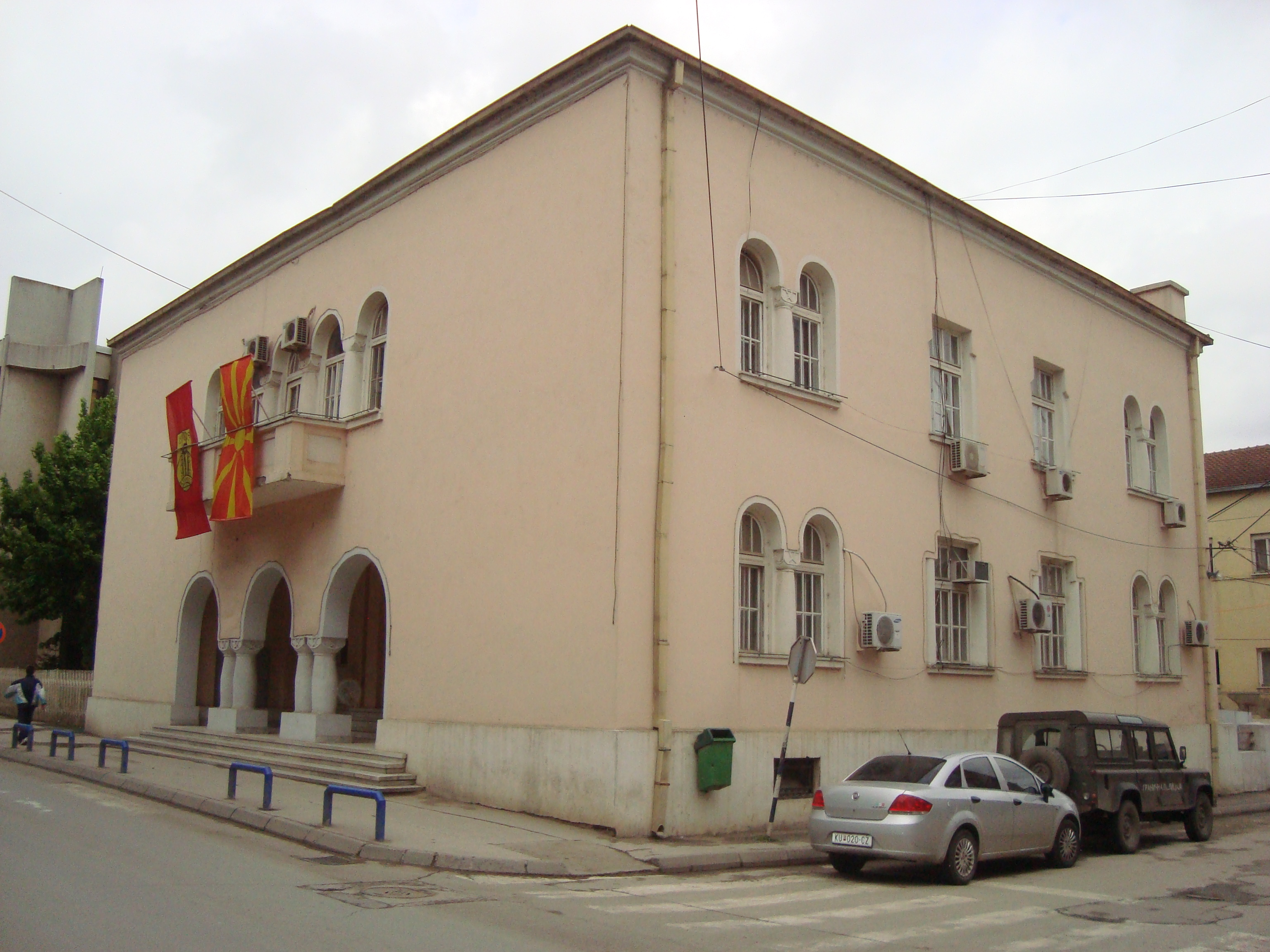
Municipal building of Kumanovo Municipality

According to the 2021 North Macedonia census, ethnic groups in the Kumanovo Municipality include:

	1953		1961		1971		1981		1994		2002		2021	
	Number	%	Number	%	Number	%	Number	%	Number	%	Number	%	Number	%
TOTAL	51,645	100	61,467	100	76,722	100	93,218	100	97,487	100	105,484	100	98,104	100
Macedonians	33,682	65.2	41,873	68.1	48,608	63.4	56,733	60.9	59,684	61.2	63,746	60.43	54,741	55.8
Albanians	1,305	2.53	2,378	3.87	10,754	14	19,042	20.4	23,526	24.1	27,290	25.87	25,493	25.99
Serbs	6,959	13.5	8,483	13.8	9,099	11.9	9,159	9.83	9,951	10.2	9,062	8.59	6,392	6.52
Roma	2,258	4.37			3,366	4.39	4,550	4.88	3118	3.2	4,256	4.03	2,795	2.85
Turks	6,734	13	4,839	7.87	3,474	4.53	1,875	2.01	389	0.4	292	0.28	143	0.15
Vlachs	116	0.22					80	0.09	123	0.13	147	0.14	117	0.12
Bosniaks											20	0.02	38	0.03
Others	591	1.14	3,894	6.34	1,421	1.85	1,779	1.91	696	0.71	671	0.64	769	0.78
Administrative Sources*													7,616	7.76
* Persons for whom data are taken from administrative sources

== Inhabited places ==
There are 49 inhabited places in this municipality, one town and 48 villages.

Inhabited Places	Total	Macedonians	Albanians	Turks	Roma	Vlachs	Serbs	Bosnians	Others	Administrative sources
Kumanovo Municipality	98,104	54,741	25,493	143	2,795	117	6,392	38	769	7,616
Agino Selo	867	783	-	-	-	-	34	-	3	50
Bedinje	898	232	531	2	-	-	48	1	1	83
Biljanovce	1423	1251	-	-	2	-	40	-	13	117
Brzak	67	49	-	-	-	-	7	-	2	9
Vakv	61	57	-	-	-	-	-	-	-	4
Vince	32	30	-	-	-	-	-	-	-	2
Gorno Konjare	1015	506	200	-	-	-	221	-	10	78
D'lga	-	-	-	-	-	-	-	-	-	
Dobrošane	1889	1666	2	-	23	26	47	1	12	112
Dolno Konjare	330	214	1	-	-	-	28	-	1	86
Karabičane	20	-	-	-	-	-	13	-	-	7
Karpoš	Merged with City of Kumanovo after 2002									
Kumanovo	75051	43280	17685	125	2768	88	4300	32	645	6128
Lopate	2063	366	1597	-	-	-	29	1	-	70
Ljubodrag	718	452	86	-	-	1	147	-	12	20
Novo Selo	274	87	-	-	-	-	182	-	1	6
Proevce	1311	1234	1	-	-	-	36	-	7	33
Pčinja	647	596	-	-	-	-	2	-	-	49
Režanovce	577	442	16	-	-	-	18	-	4	97
Rečica	479	83	-	-	-	-	300	-	4	92
Romanovce	2566	569	1804	11	-	-	3	1	7	171
Sopot	354	-	325	-	-	-	3	1	2	23
Studena Bara	231	200	-	-	-	-	-	-	-	31
Suševo	7	2	-	-	-	-	5	-	-	-
Tabanovce	817	241	211	-	-	-	294	-	4	67
Tromegja	1187	757	-	-	-	1	389	-	6	34
Umni Dol	381	223	1	-	-	-	140	-	7	10
Čerkezi	3137	3	3027	5	-	1	-	1	1	99
Četirce	165	31	-	-	-	-	94	-	2	38
Šupli Kamen	53	37	-	-	-	-	1	-	-	15
Jačince	72	69	-	-	-	-	2	-	-	1
Skačkovci	105	100	-	-	-	-	1	-	1	3
Pezovo	13	13	-	-	-	-	-	-	-	-
Orašac	290	268	3	-	-	-	3	-	3	13
Novoseljane	20	19	-	-	-	-	-	-	-	1
Murgaš	11	8	-	-	-	-	-	-	-	3
K’sanje	15	11	-	-	-	-	-	-	-	4
Kučkarevo	80	78	-	-	-	-	-	-	-	2
Kutlibeg	2	2	-	-	-	-	-	-	-	-
Kosmatac	15	13	-	-	-	-	-	-	-	2
Količko	34	29	-	-	-	-	-	-	-	5
Kokošinje	12	12	-	-	-	-	-	-	-	-
Klečevce	472	440	1	-	2	-	4	-	1	24
Žubovce	13	8	-	-	-	-	-	-	-	5
Živinje	19	19	-	-	-	-	-	-	-	-
Dovezence	83	73	-	-	-	-	1	-	-	9
Gradište	127	119	1	-	-	-	-	-	-	7
Gabreš	44	44	-	-	-	-	-	-	-	-
Beljakovce	54	25	-	-	-	-	-	-	23	6

== See also ==
- Mayor of the Kumanovo Municipality.
- Coat of arms of Kumanovo
- List of mayors of Kumanovo
- Maksim Dimitrievski
