= Josip Broz Tito Monument, Kumanovo =

Monument in North Macedonia

Josip Broz Tito Monument
- Year: 2006
- Location: Kumanovo; 42°08′08″N 21°43′10″E

Josip Broz Tito Monument is a monument in Kumanovo, North Macedonia honoring former Marshal of Yugoslavia Josip Broz Tito. The monument is at the northwest side of the Josip Broz Tito Square.

== See also ==
- Socialist Federative Republic of Yugoslavia
