= Josip Broz Tito Square (Kumanovo) =

Municipal square in North Macedonia

Josip Broz Tito Square Плоштад Јосип Броз Тито
- Public square
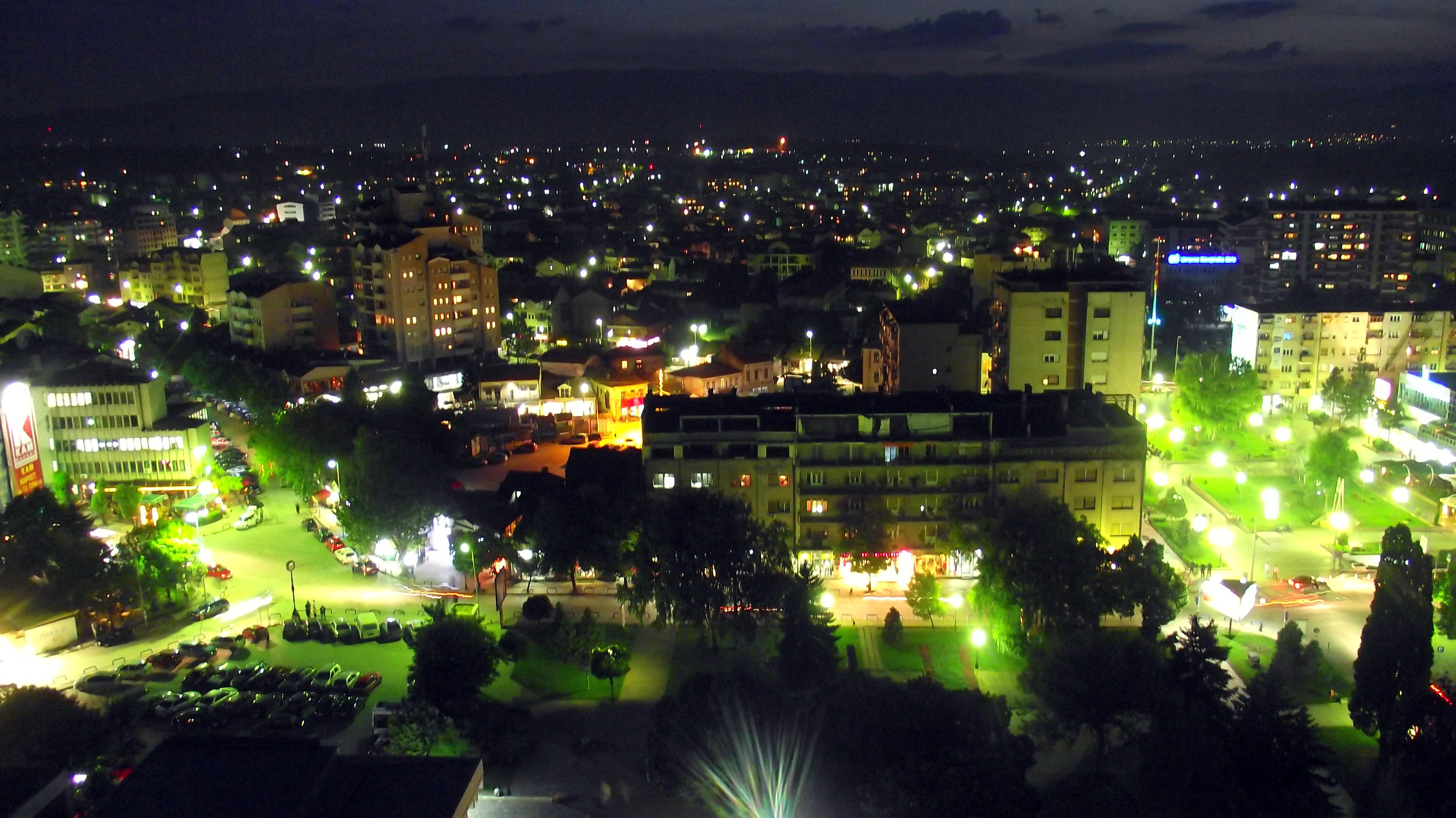
- Josip Broz Tito Square at night
- Dedicated to: Josip Broz Tito
- Owner: Kumanovo Municipality
- Manager: Zoran Damjanovski
- Location: Kumanovo, North Macedonia
- Interactive map of Josip Broz Tito Square; Плоштад Јосип Броз Тито
- Coordinates: 42.1353°N 21.7199°E
- Website: kumanovo.gov.mk/v2/

Josip Broz Tito Square (Плоштад Јосип Броз Тито) is a municipal square in Kumanovo, North Macedonia.

== Notable Landmarks ==
A sculpture takes the northeast corner of the square, Cultural Center makes the south border and SUMA Shopping Center is on the east. On the west and northwest is the Nova Jugoslavija Square and the so-called Skopje Shops are on the north. Also in the northwest corner is the Josip Broz Tito Monument.

== List of Events ==
Date(s)	Type of Event(s)	Name of Event(s)	Est. attendance	Artist(s)
16 July 2006	Concert	Kumanovo Town of Culture 2006	?	Kaliopi
9 April 2015	Concert	Eastern Concert	?	Srma

== See also ==
- Nova Jugoslavija Square
- Kumanovo

== Gallery ==
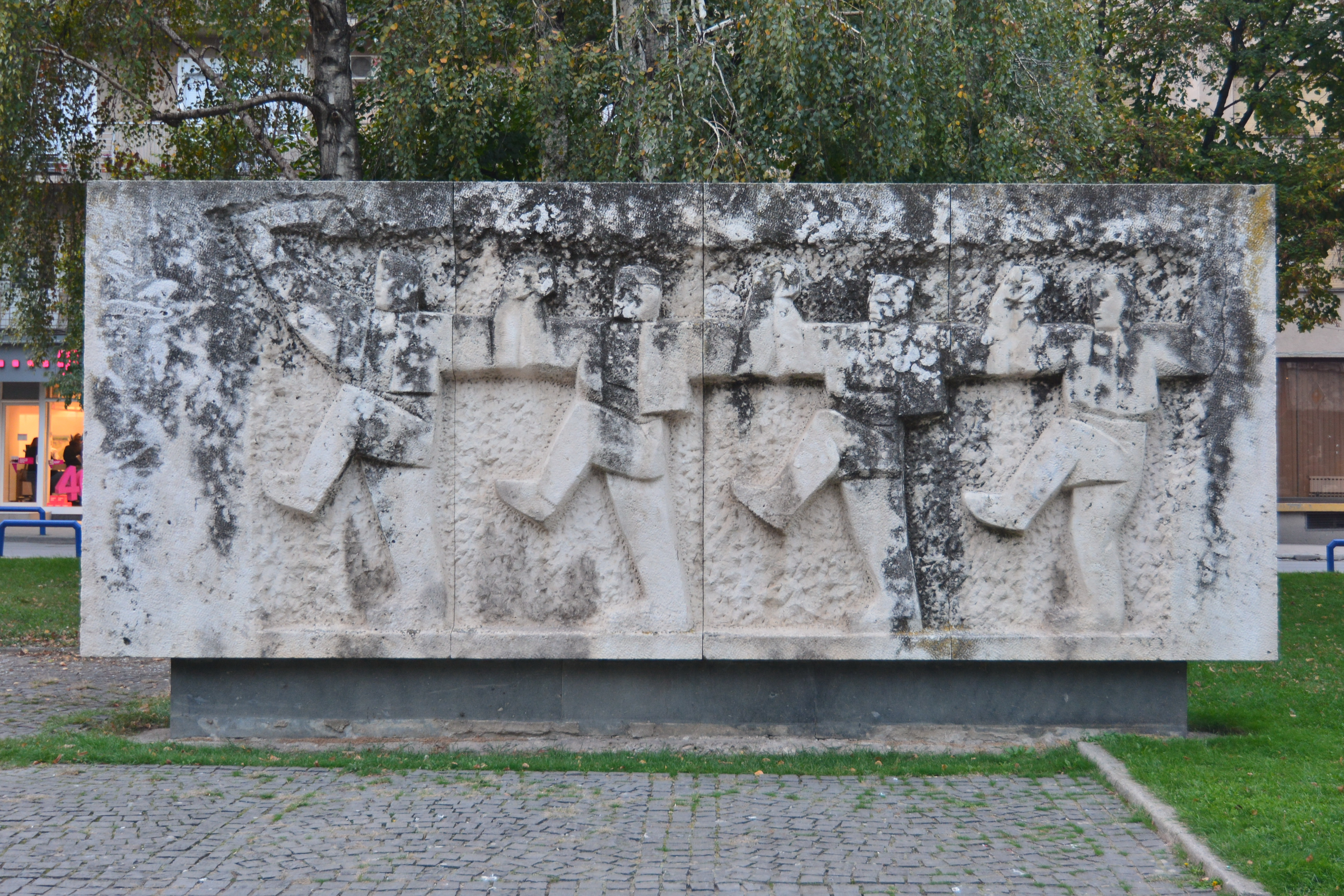
Monument from National Liberation War of Macedonia on the square

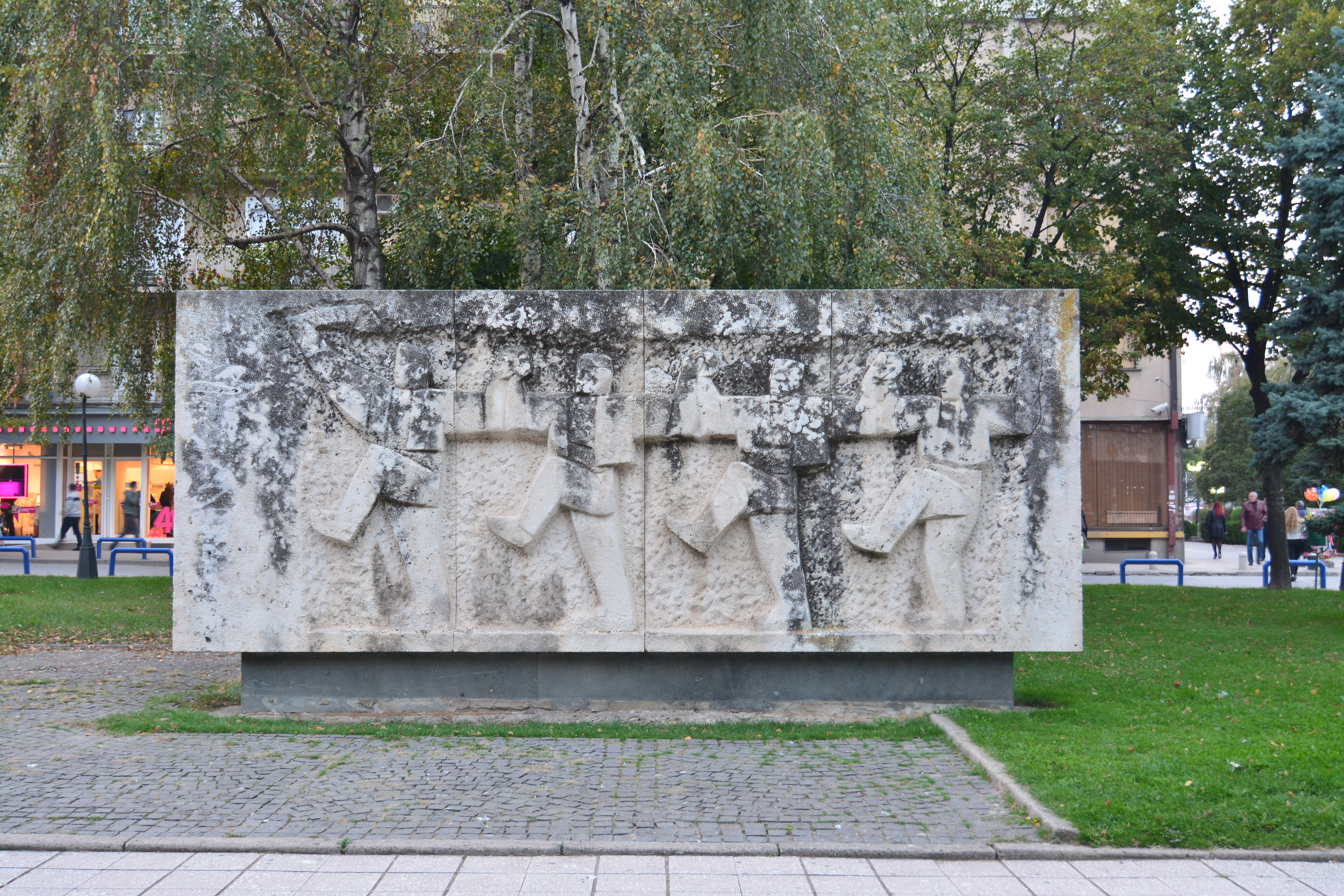
Monument from National Liberation War of Macedonia on the square (2)
