= Nova Jugoslavija Square =

Municipal square in Kumanovo, North Macedonia

- Public square
- Town Square Kumanovo; Градски Плоштад Куманово; Sheshi i Qytetit Kumanovë
- Плоштад Нова Југославија; Sheshi Jugosllavia e Re
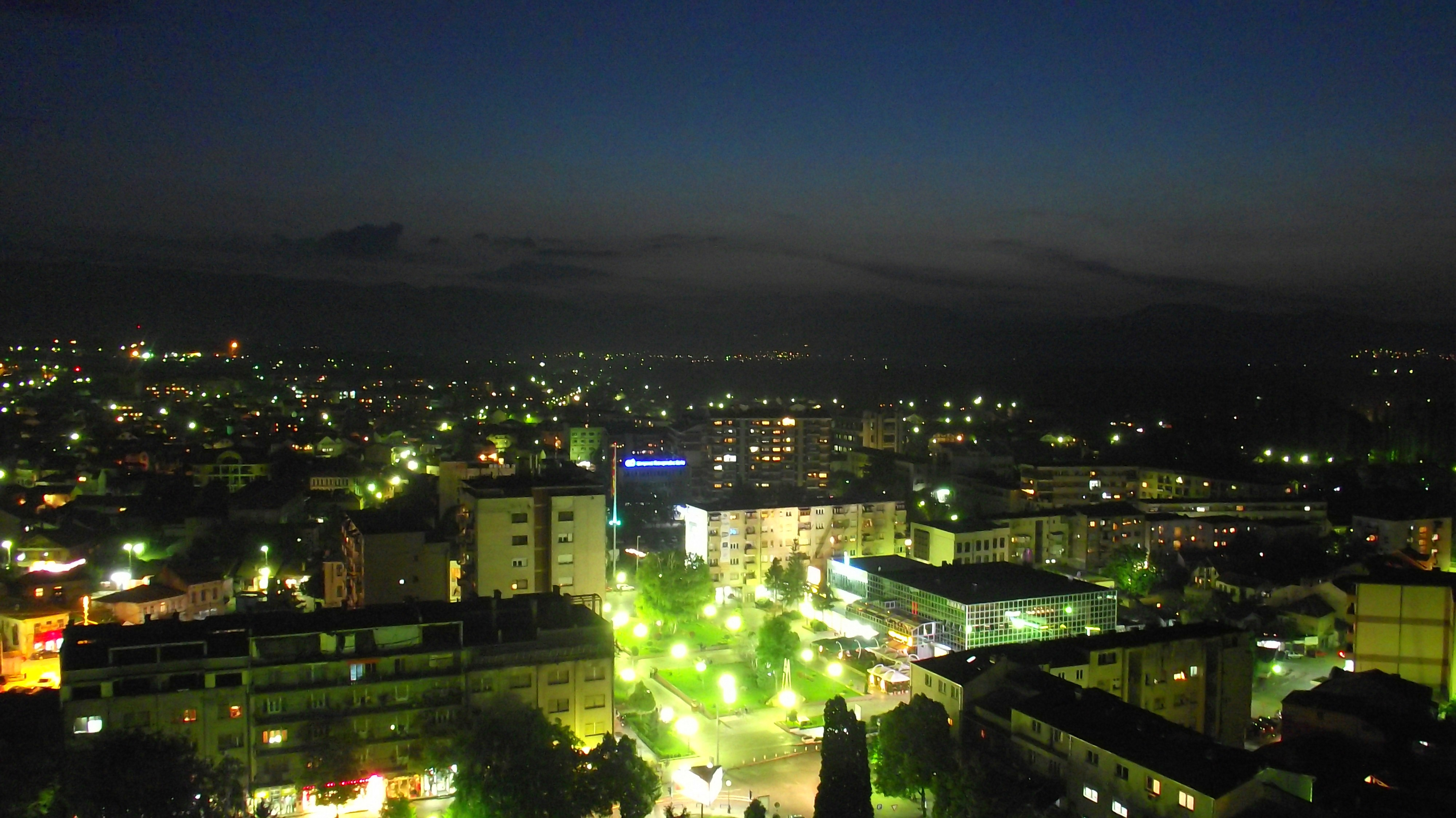
- Nova Jugoslavija Square at night
- Constructed: 2005 (partially reconstructed)
- Manager: Zoran Damjanovski
- Location: Kumanovo, North Macedonia
- Interactive map of Nova Jugoslavija Square
- Coordinates: 42.1358°N 21.7185°E
- Website: kumanovo.gov.mk/v2/

Nova Jugoslavija Square (Macedonian: Плоштад Нова Југославија, Albanian: Sheshi Jugosllavia e Re) is a municipal square in Kumanovo, North Macedonia.

== Construction ==
The square was reconstructed in 2006 for an estimated cost of 160,000 euros.

== Notable landmarks ==
Zanatski Dom is one of the buildings on the square that was built before the Second World War. Recently there have been erected two monuments on the square

- Batko Gjorgjija Monument
- Chetiri Bandere Monument

Gradski Ploshtad is surrounded by buildings built mostly from the SFRY time. First floors of some of them were adopted in to very lucrative real-estates. The following companies found their place.

- T-Mobile shop
- One Shop
- Tinex Market
- Nama Café
- Mister George Café
- Club Night Club
- Office Plus shop
- K-Net Shop
- Tehnomarket Shop
- Komercijalna Banka A.D. Skopje Shop
- Demetra Shop

There are no operating hotels close to the square. In the 1990s the hotel Kristal was closed due to financial difficulties. The Kasapski Krug building is just across Goce Delchev street as one of the landmark buildings of Kumanovo.

== List of events ==
| Date/s | Type of Event/s | Name of Event/s | Est. attendance | Artist/s |
|---|---|---|---|---|
| 2005, 10 November | Concert | Municipal Liberation Day Party, 60th anniversary | ? | Toše Proeski, Beni Shakiri |
| 2006, 11 October | Concert | Renovated Square Party | 30.000 | Zdravko Čolić |
| 2007, 31 December | Concert | Municipal New Year's Eve Party | ? | Vlado Janevski |
| 2008, 10 November | Concert | Municipal Liberation Day Party | ? | Petar Grašo, Boris Novkovikj, Jelena Rozga |
| 2008, 31 December | Concert | Municipal New Year's Eve Party | ? | Hara Mata Hari |
| 2009, 10 November | Concert | Municipal Liberation Day Party | ? | Momčilo Bajagić |
| 2009, 31 December | Concert | Municipal New Year's Eve Party | ? | Severina Vučković |
| 2010, 10 November | Concert | Municipal Liberation Day Party | ? | Haris Džinović |
| 2011, 6 September | Bras Bends Festival | Roma Tumba Fest | ? | Demiran Klemirovikj, Kristijan Azirovich, Elvis Bajramovich, Ilmi Agushev, Segedin Ddurmishev |
| 2011, 29 September | Fair | Days of Hunny | ? | Zdruzenie Pchela Kumanovo |
| 2011, 10 November | Concert | Municipal Liberation Day Party | ? | Aca Lukas |
| 2012, 31 December | Concert | Municipal New Year's Eve Party | ? | Daniela Martinovikj |
| 2013, 16 May | Carnival | Municipal Masquerade Batko Gjorgjija 2013 | ? | 2000 kindergarten, elementary and high school students from Kumanovo Municipality |
| 2013, 23–25 August | Concert | 9th International Tambura Fest | ? | To Zorule, Despina, Nino Velickovski, Kumanovo tambura, Oketet Kumanovo, Boheme, Sasko Kocev, Pero Hristov, Violeta Tomovska, Margica Antevska, Sounds of Fisheries, Podgorica, Zdravko Djuranovic and friends, with orchestra Dejan Ilic |
| 2013, 10 November | Concert | Municipal Liberation Day Party | ? | Jelena Rozga |
| 2013, 31 December | Concert | Municipal New Year's Eve Party | ? | Nokaut, Tajzi |
| 2014, 7 September | Concert | Rock’n Pop the Borders | ? | Enkhaosment, Chainsaw Babies, TV Rage, Vizija, Polemique, Problem Solved |
| 2014, 10 November | Concert | Municipal Liberation Day Party | ? | Tropiko Bend |
| 2014, 31 December | Concert | Municipal New Year's Eve Party | ? | Regina |
| 2015, 22 August | Concert | International Tambura Festival | ? | Miroslav Shkoro, Nino Velichkovski, Martinijan Kirilovski, Ivona Jovanovich |
| 2015, 11 November | Concert | Municipal Liberation Day Party | ? | Boris Novkovich |
| 2015, 30 December | Concert | Municipal New Year's Eve Party | ? | Martinijan Kirilovski, Margica Antevska, Nino Velichkovski, Akrepet, Concrete Jungle, Madara, Fusnota |

== Gallery ==
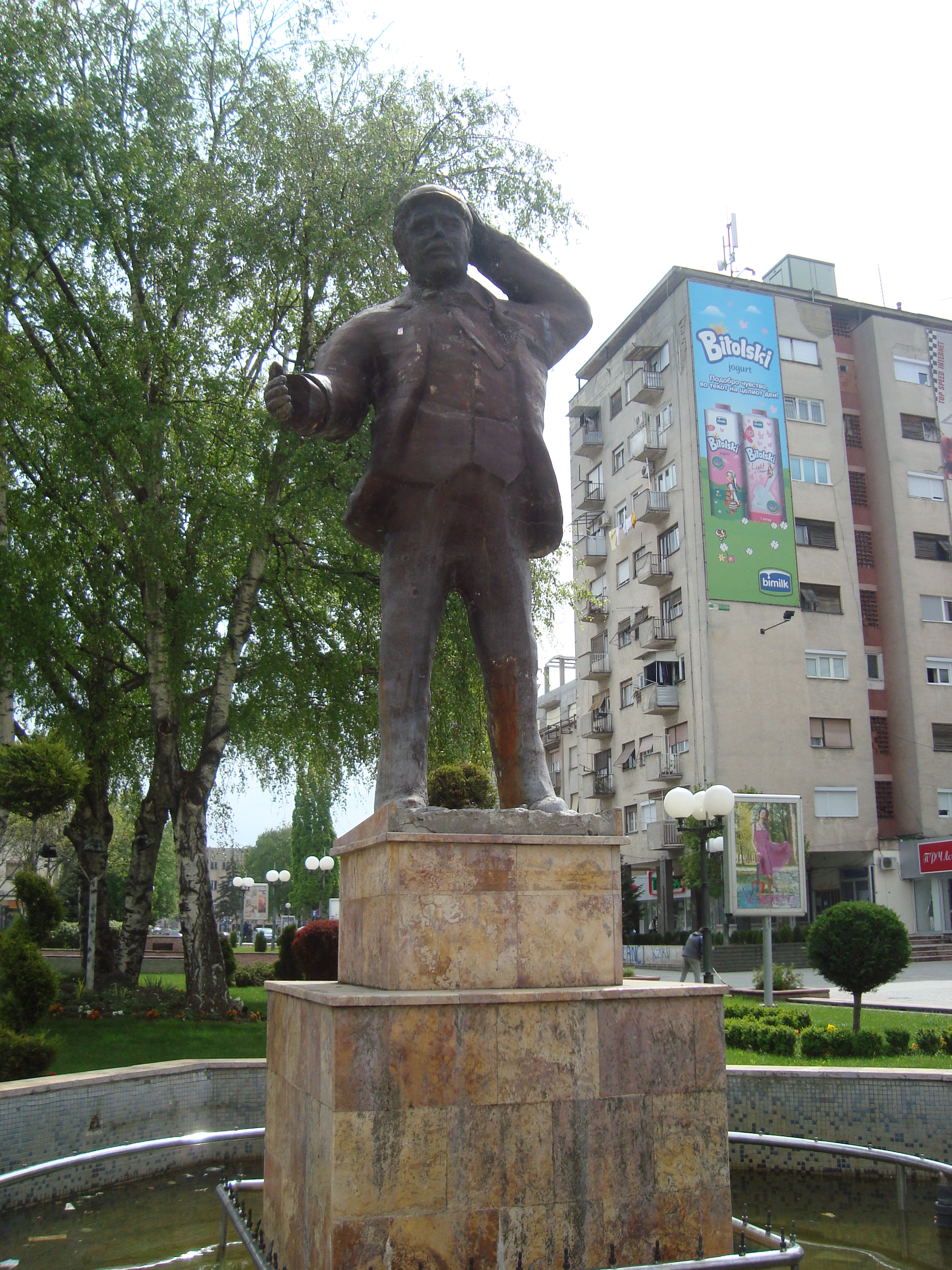
Batko Gjorgjija monument in the Nova Jugoslavija Square

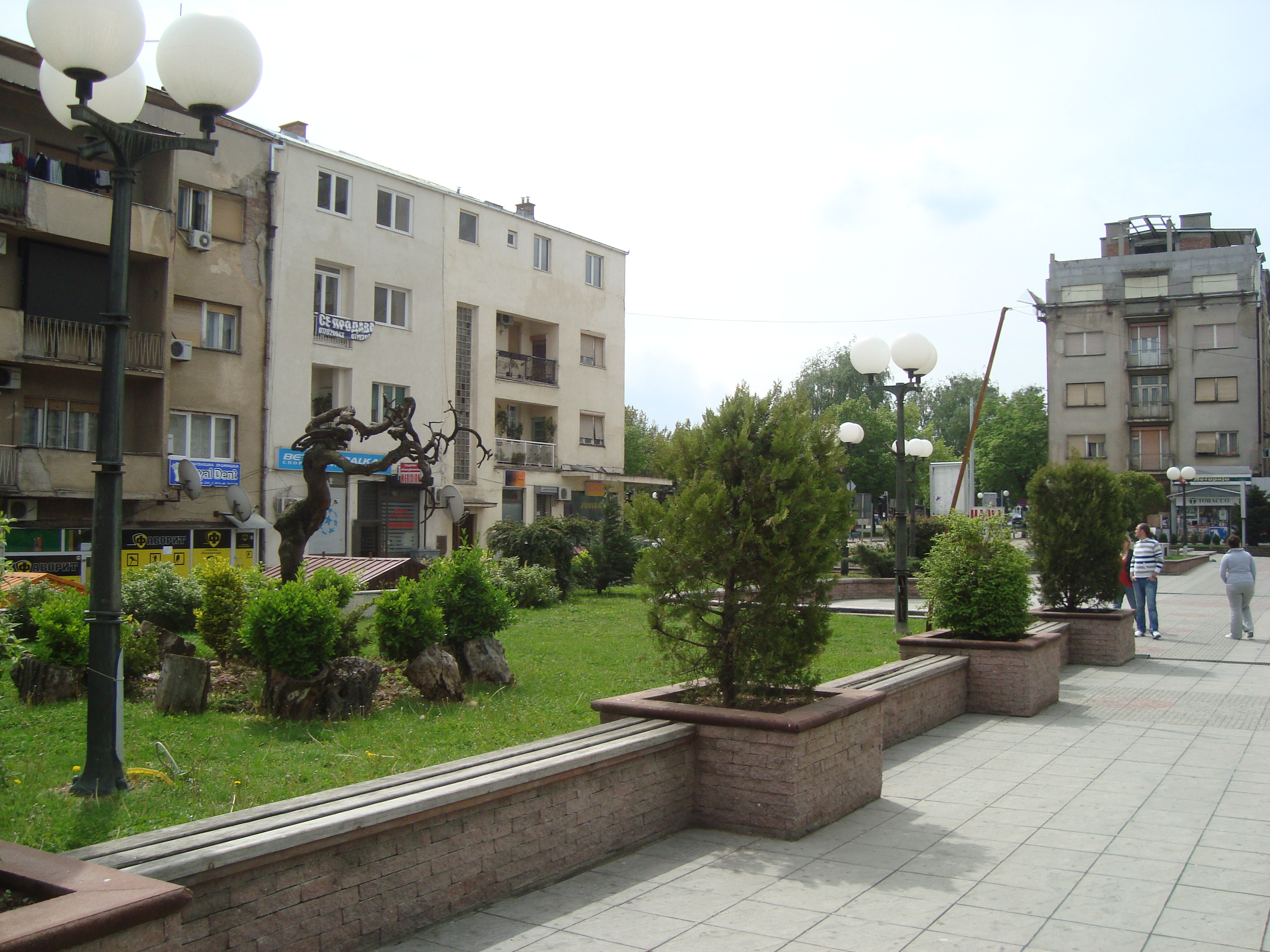
Greneery on Nova Jugoslavija Square

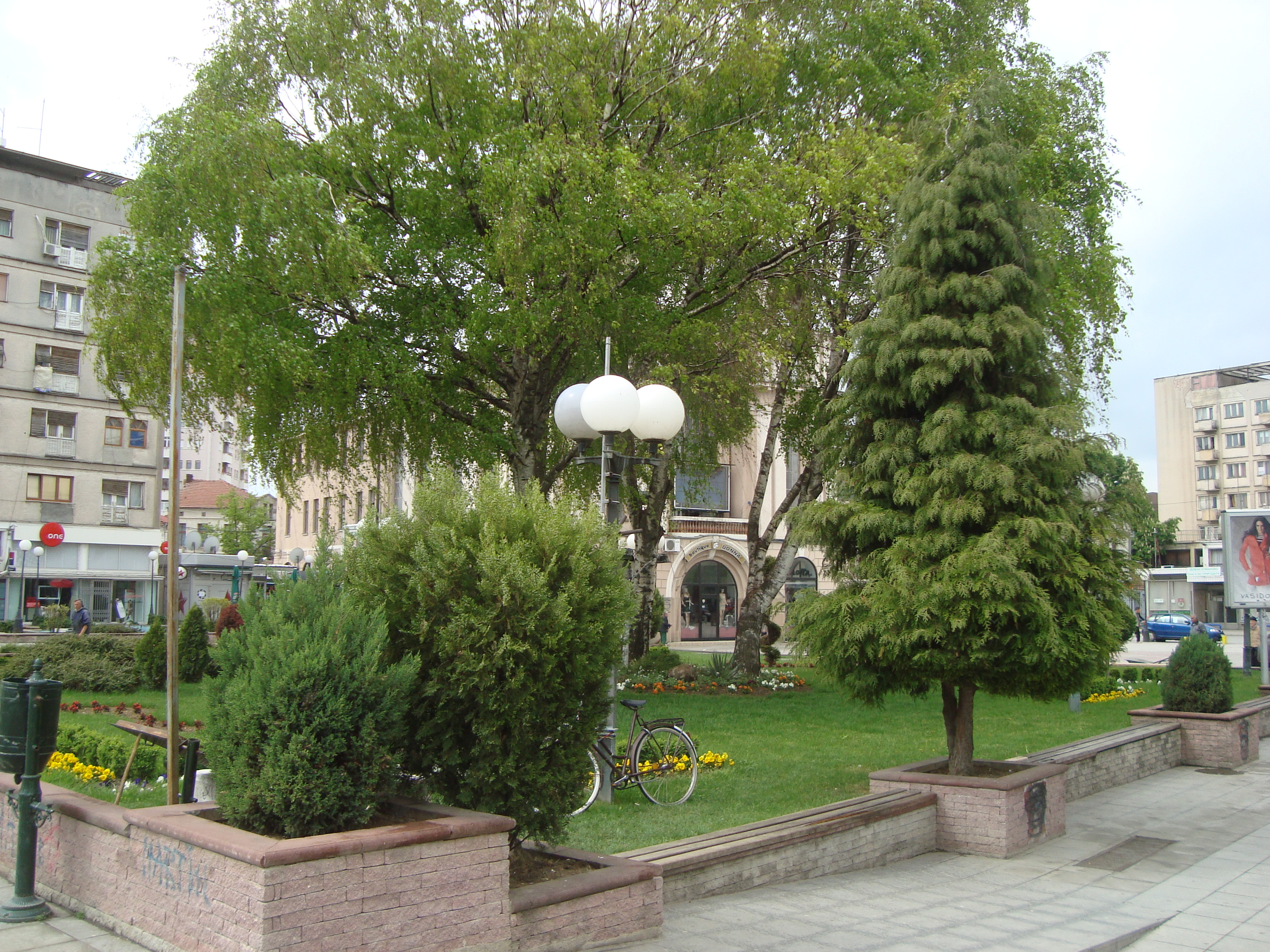
Greneery on Nova Jugoslavija Square 2

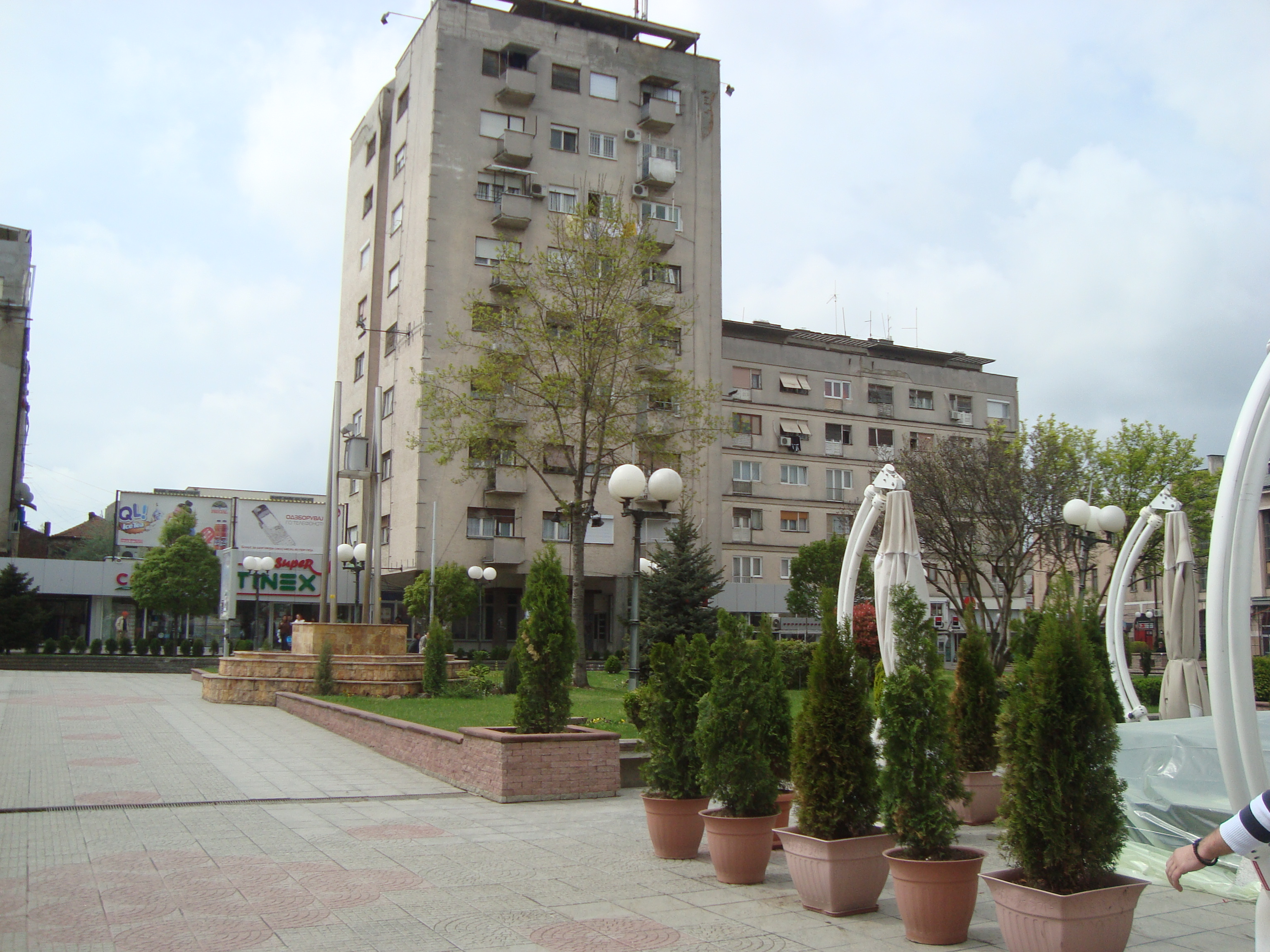
Tinex Market on the square

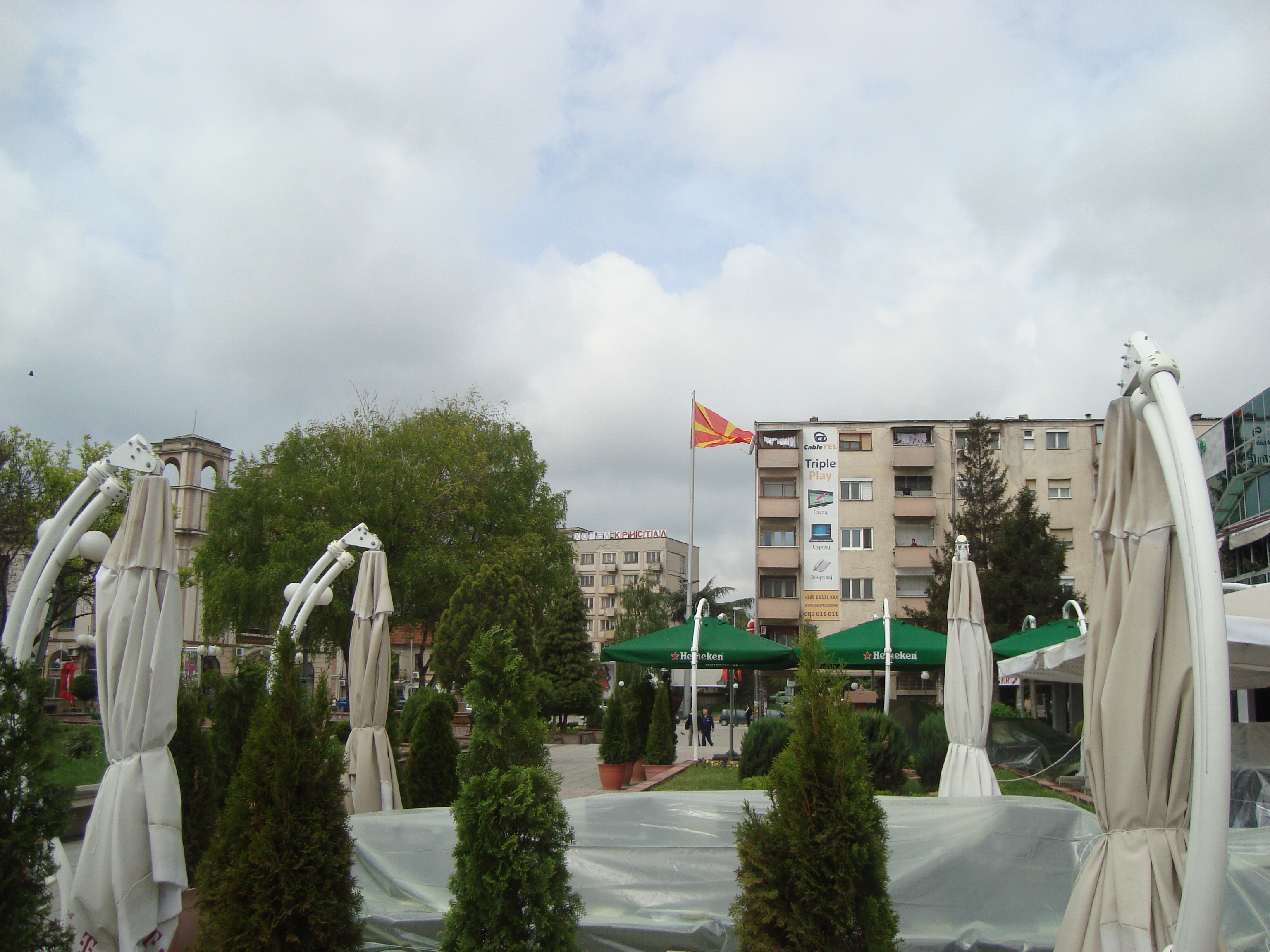
Mast with the Macedonian Flag next to Nova Jugoslavija Square

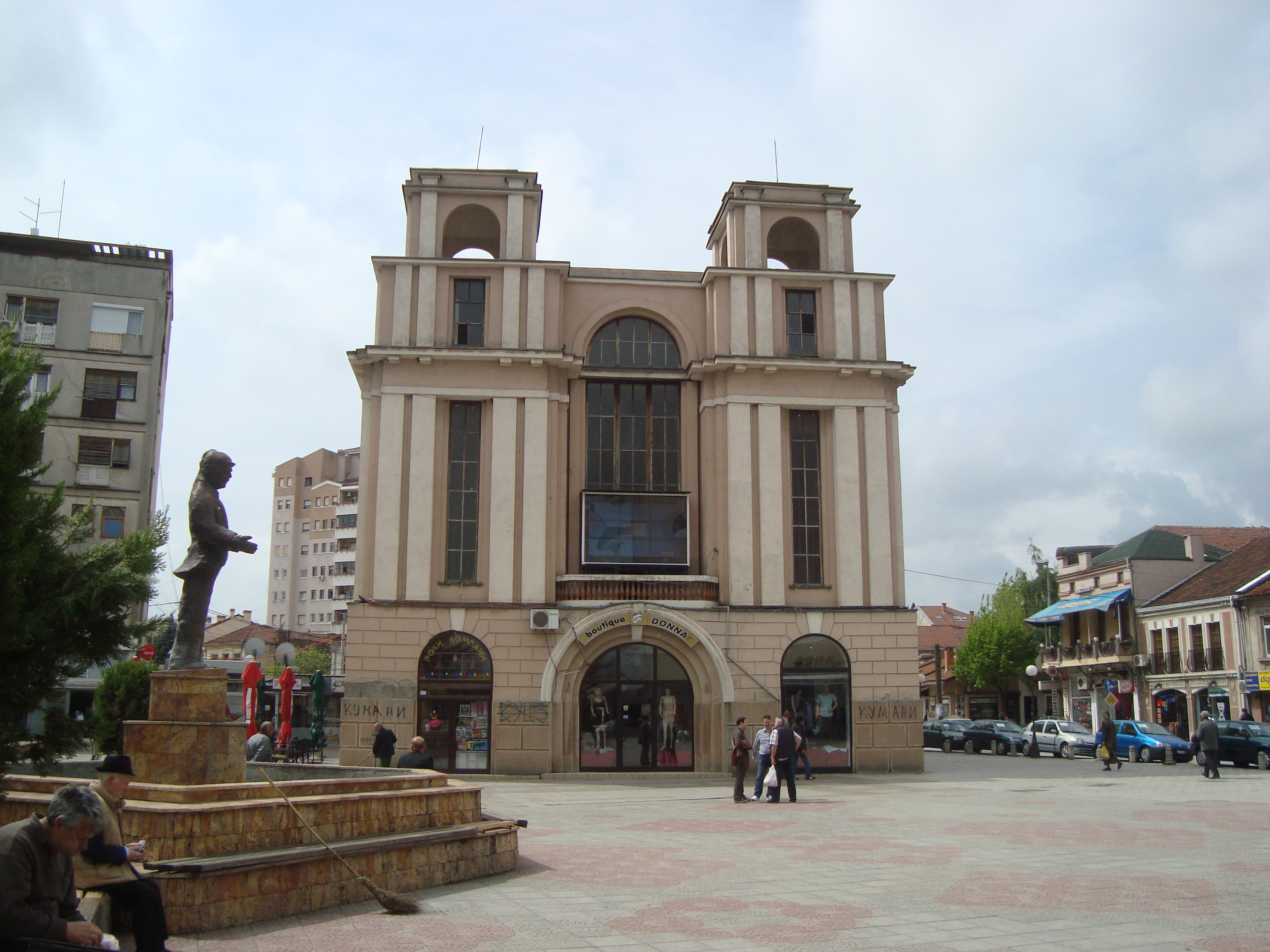
Zanatski Dom Building

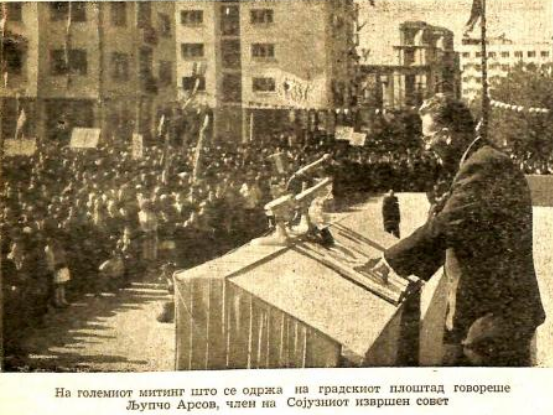
11 October celebration in 1961
