= Bitola =

Bitola Битола (Macedonian)
- City
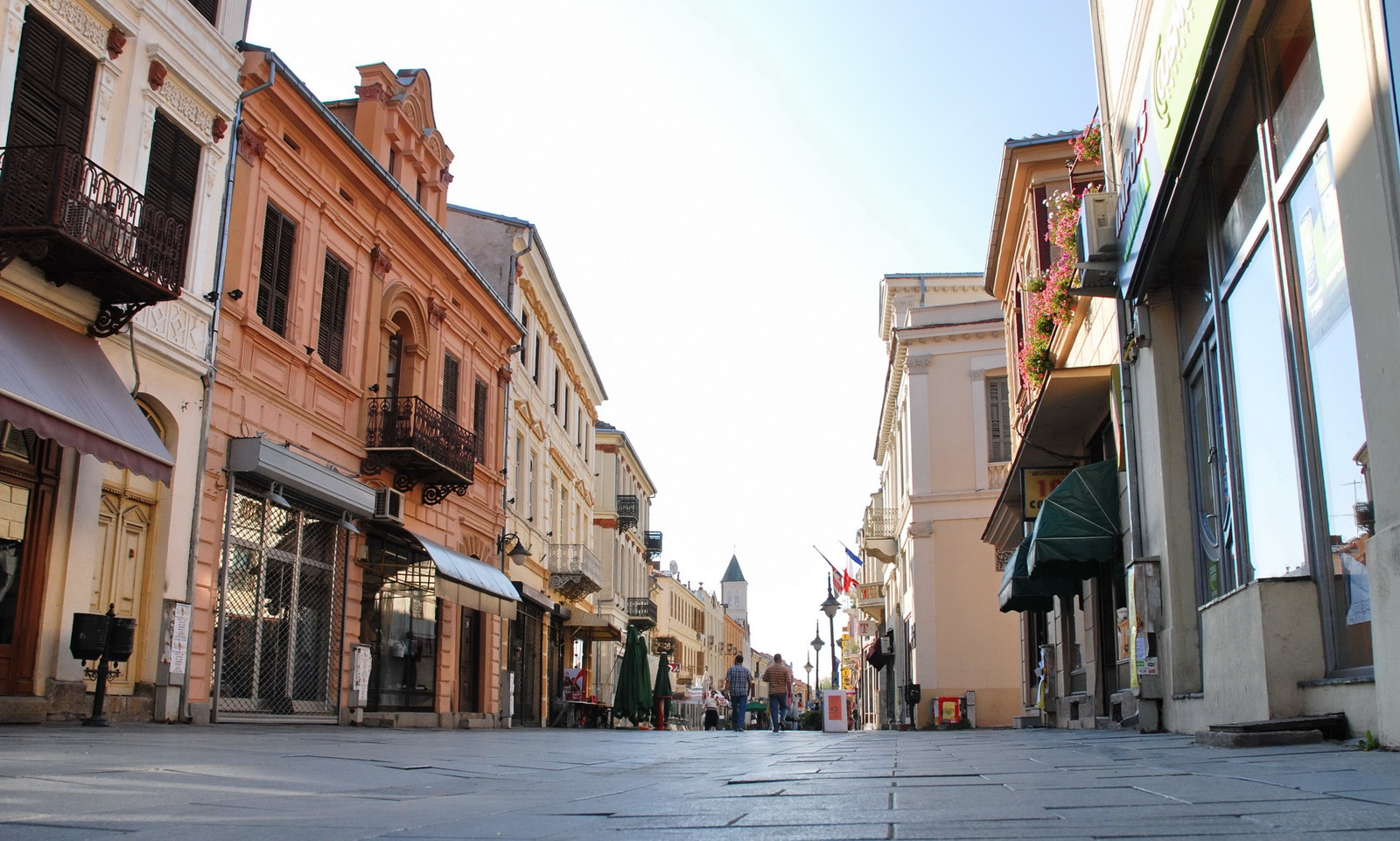
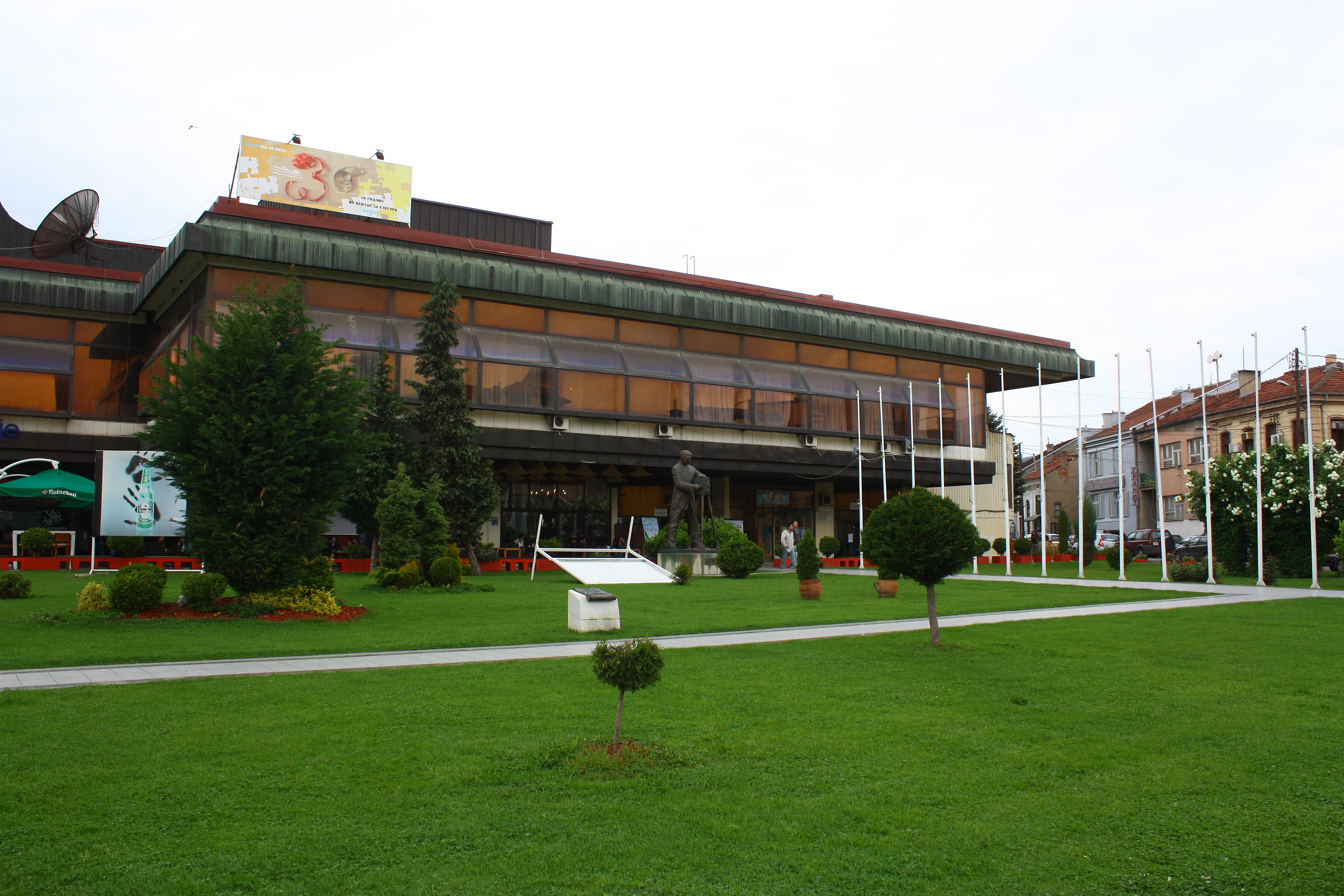
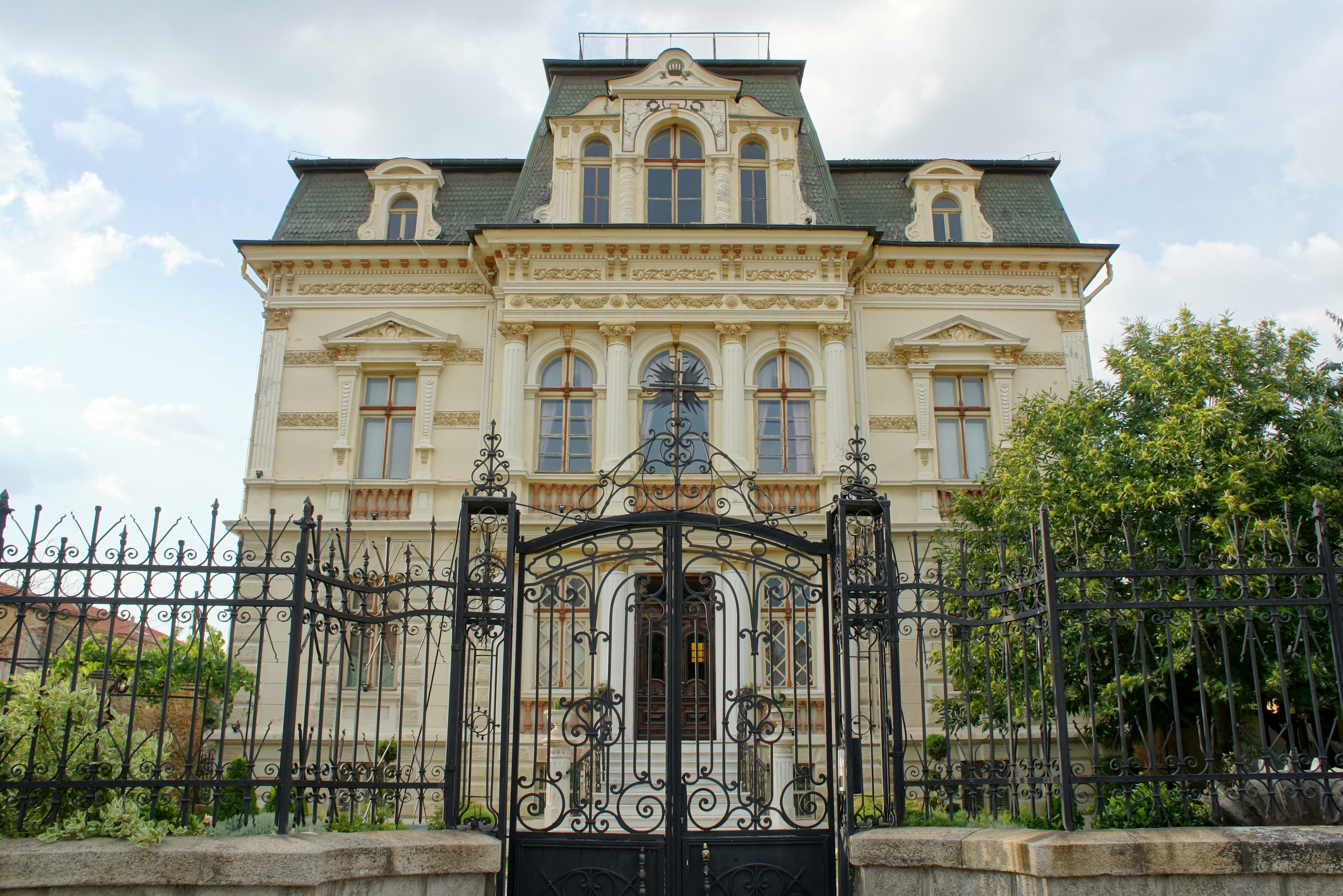
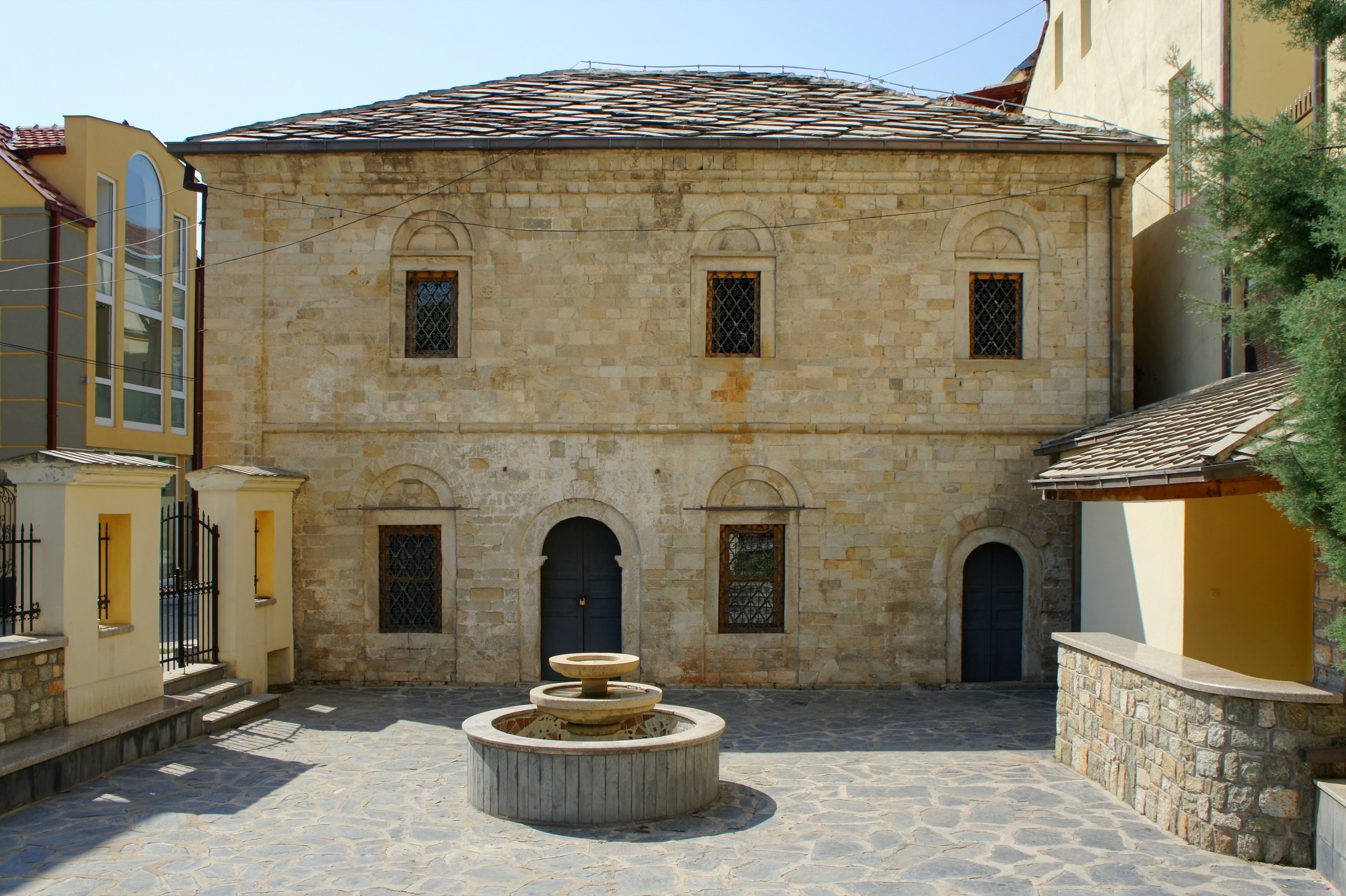
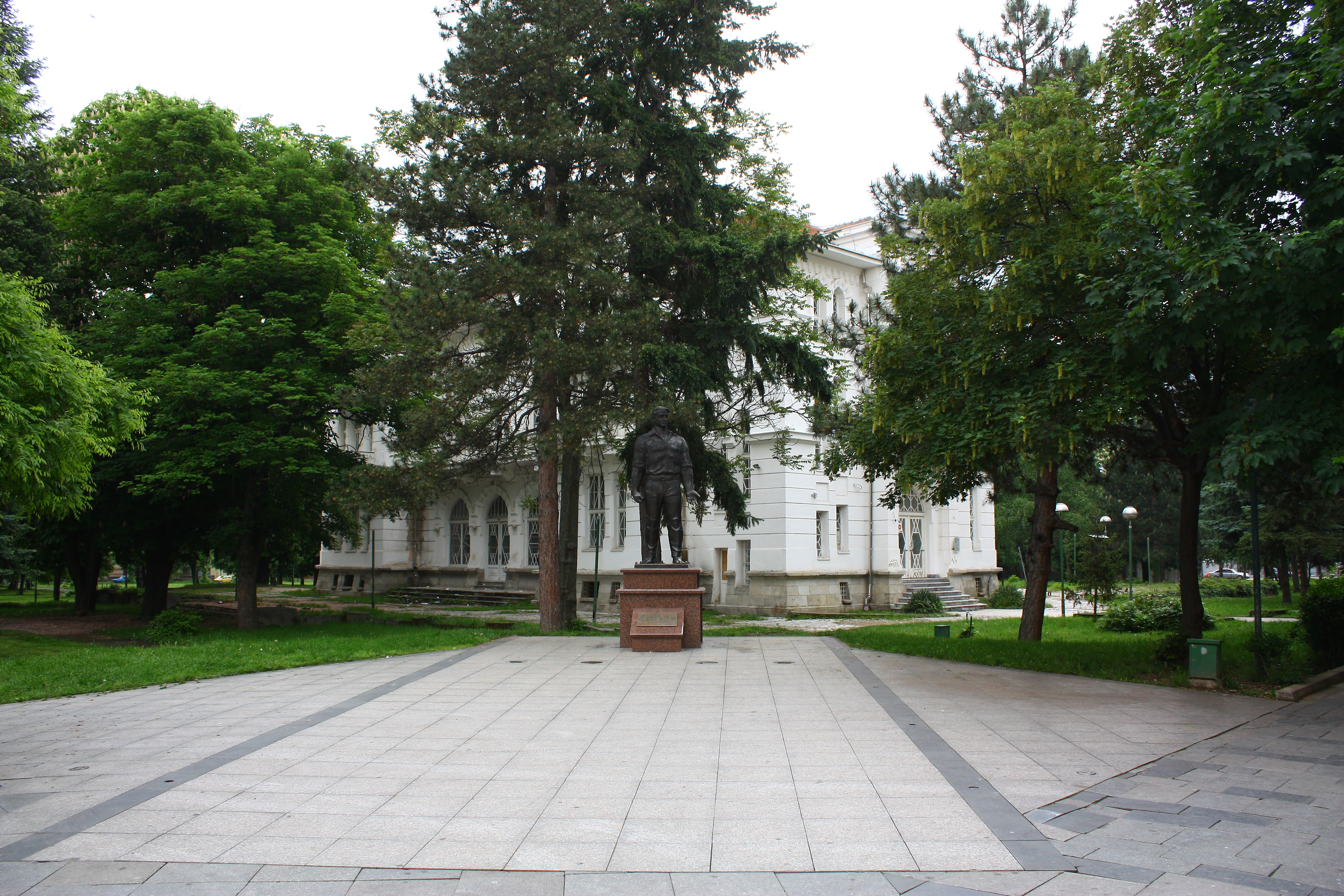
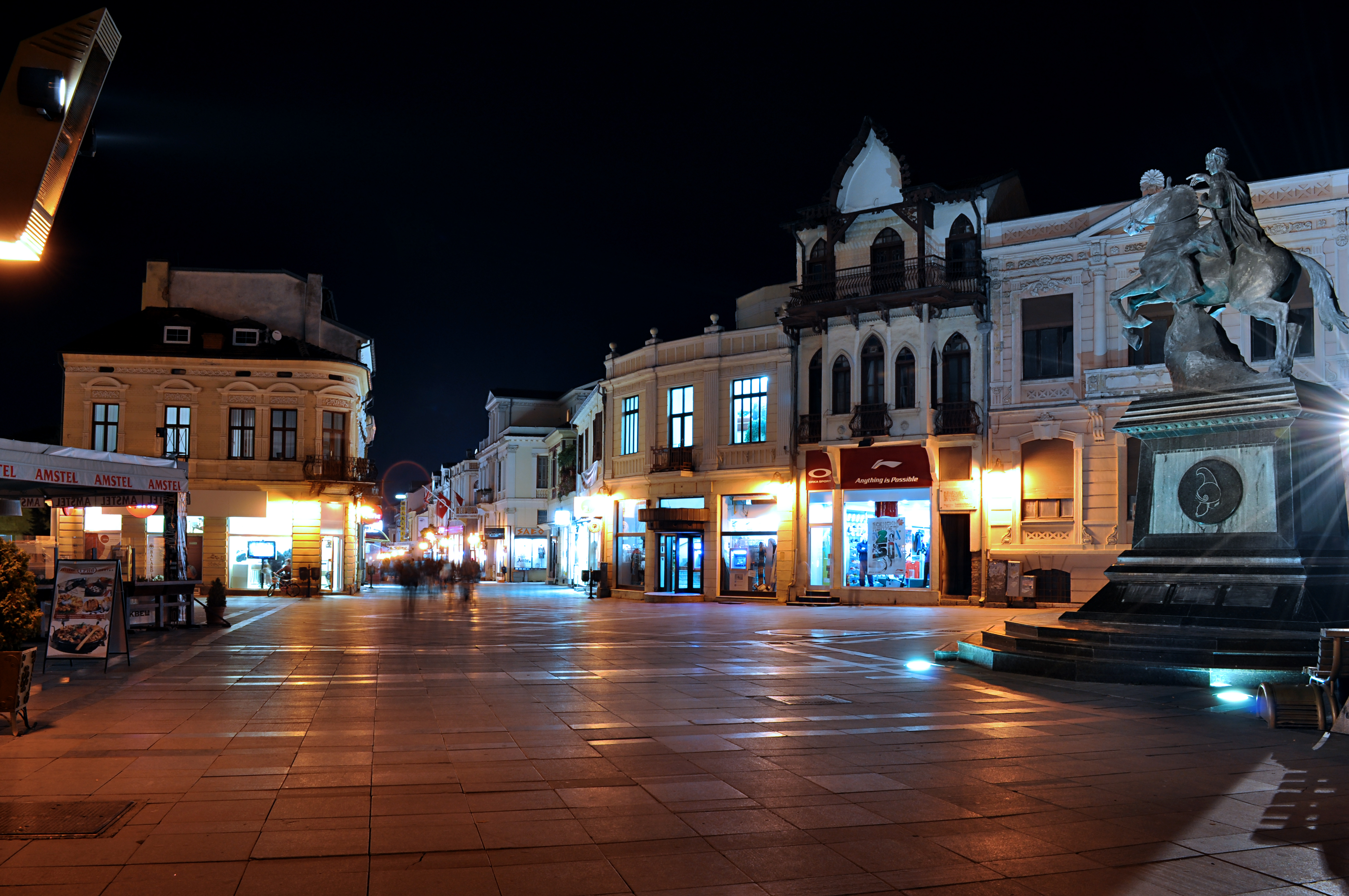
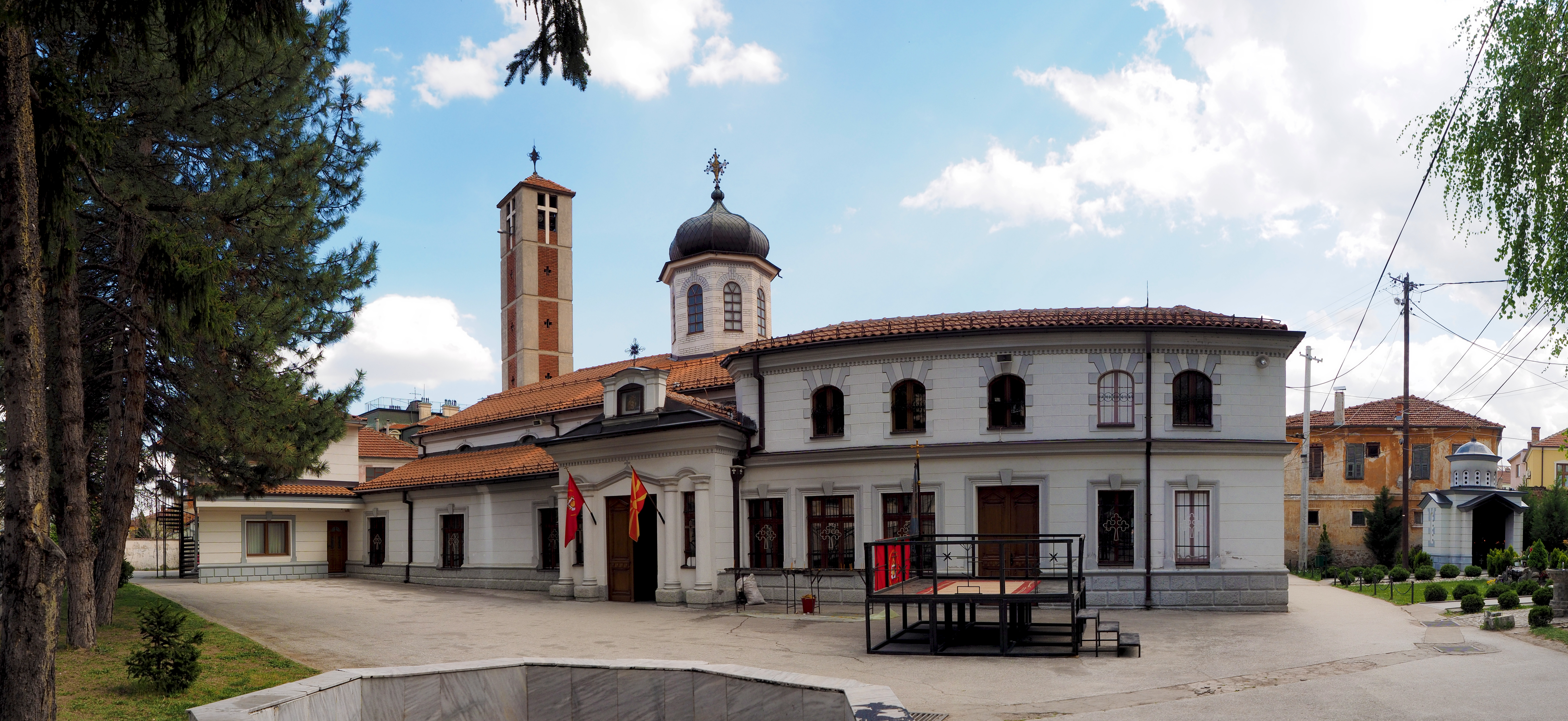
- Clockwise from top: Širok Sokak, Prespa-Pelagona Diocese building, Bitola Clock Tower, Magnolia Square, Church of the Nativity of the Virgin Mary, Officers' Hall, Magaza building, Cultural Centre

- Flag Coat of arms
- Nickname: Градот на конзулите (Macedonian); Gradot na konzulite ("The City of Consuls")
- Motto: Битола, бабам Битола (Macedonian); Bitola, babam Bitola
- Location in Bitola Municipality

- Location within North Macedonia Location within Balkans
- Coordinates: 41°01′55″N 21°20′05″E
- Country: North Macedonia
- Region: Pelagonia
- Municipality: Bitola

Government
  - Mayor: Toni Konjanovski (VMRO-DPMNE)

Area
  - City: 2,637 km^{2} (1,018 sq mi)
- Elevation: 650 m (2,130 ft)

Population (2021)
  - City: 69,287
  - Density: 26.27/km^{2} (68.05/sq mi)
  - Metro: 105,644
- Time zone: UTC+1 (CET)
  - Summer (DST): UTC+2 (CEST)
- Postal codes: 7000
- Area code: +389 (0)47
- Vehicle registration: BT
- Patron Saints: Saint Nectarios of Bitola
- Climate: Cfb
- Website: www.bitola.gov.mk

Bitola (/ˈbiːtoʊlə, -tələ/; Macedonian: Битола [ˈbitɔɫa]) is a city in the southwestern part of North Macedonia. It is located in the southern part of the Pelagonia valley, surrounded by the Baba, Nidže, and Kajmakčalan mountain ranges, 14 kilometres (9 miles) north of the Medžitlija-Níki border crossing with Greece. The city stands at an important junction connecting the south of the Adriatic Sea region with the Aegean Sea and Central Europe, and it is an administrative, cultural, industrial, commercial, and educational centre. It has been known since the Ottoman period as the "City of Consuls", since many European countries had consulates in Bitola.

Bitola, known during the Ottoman Empire as Manastır or Monastir, is one of the oldest cities in North Macedonia. It was founded as Heraclea Lyncestis in the middle of the 4th century BC by Philip II of Macedon. The city was the last capital of the First Bulgarian Empire (1015–1018) and the last capital of Ottoman Rumelia, from 1836 to 1867. According to the 2002 census, Bitola is the third largest city in the country, after the capital Skopje and Kumanovo. Bitola is also the seat of the Bitola Municipality.

== Etymology ==
The name Bitola is derived from the Old Church Slavonic word ѡ҆би́тѣл҄ь (obitěĺь, meaning "monastery" or "cloister"), literally "abode," as the city was formerly noted for its monastery. When the meaning of the name was no longer understood, it lost its prefix "o-". The name Bitola is mentioned in the Bitola inscription, related to the old city fortress built in 1015 during the ruling of Gavril Radomir of Bulgaria (1014–1015) when Bitola served as capital of the First Bulgarian Empire.

== Geography ==
Bitola is in southwestern North Macedonia. The Dragor River flows through the city. Bitola is at an elevation of 615 metres above sea level, at the foot of Baba Mountain.

It has an area of 1,798 km^{2} (694 sq mi) and had a population of 122,173 in 1991.

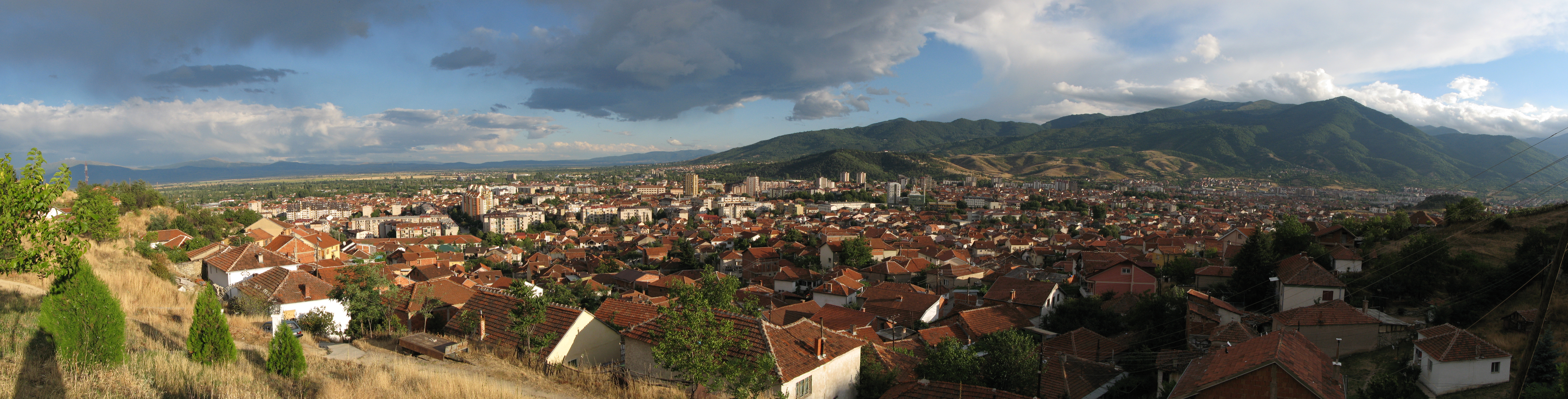
Panorama of Bitola from Krkardaš.

== Climate ==
Bitola has a mildly continental climate typical of the Pelagonija region, experiencing very warm and dry summers, and cold and snowy winters. The Köppen climate classification for this climate is Cfb, which would be an oceanic climate, going by the original −3 °C (27 °F) threshold.

Climate data for Bitola (1961–1990 normals, extremes 1948–1993)
Month	Jan	Feb	Mar	Apr	May	Jun	Jul	Aug	Sep	Oct	Nov	Dec	Year
Record high °C (°F)	17.2 (63.0)	21.2 (70.2)	31.2 (88.2)	30.0 (86.0)	32.5 (90.5)	38.0 (100.4)	40.6 (105.1)	39.0 (102.2)	36.0 (96.8)	30.8 (87.4)	26.1 (79.0)	19.4 (66.9)	40.6 (105.1)
Mean daily maximum °C (°F)	3.3 (37.9)	6.5 (43.7)	11.3 (52.3)	16.5 (61.7)	21.7 (71.1)	25.9 (78.6)	28.6 (83.5)	28.5 (83.3)	24.8 (76.6)	18.3 (64.9)	11.5 (52.7)	5.3 (41.5)	16.9 (62.4)
Daily mean °C (°F)	−0.8 (30.6)	1.9 (35.4)	6.3 (43.3)	11.1 (52.0)	15.7 (60.3)	19.5 (67.1)	21.7 (71.1)	21.1 (70.0)	17.2 (63.0)	11.4 (52.5)	6.2 (43.2)	1.0 (33.8)	11.0 (51.8)
Mean daily minimum °C (°F)	−4.5 (23.9)	−2.3 (27.9)	1.3 (34.3)	5.0 (41.0)	8.7 (47.7)	11.7 (53.1)	13.1 (55.6)	12.8 (55.0)	9.9 (49.8)	5.6 (42.1)	1.7 (35.1)	−2.6 (27.3)	5.0 (41.0)
Record low °C (°F)	−29.4 (−20.9)	−26.1 (−15.0)	−18.7 (−1.7)	−3.5 (25.7)	−1.6 (29.1)	3.3 (37.9)	5.4 (41.7)	2.6 (36.7)	−1.0 (30.2)	−6.1 (21.0)	−15.3 (4.5)	−26.7 (−16.1)	−29.4 (−20.9)
Average precipitation mm (inches)	50.1 (1.97)	49.9 (1.96)	51.2 (2.02)	43.8 (1.72)	61.0 (2.40)	40.4 (1.59)	40.2 (1.58)	31.2 (1.23)	35.0 (1.38)	55.9 (2.20)	73.2 (2.88)	68.0 (2.68)	599.9 (23.62)
Average precipitation days (≥ 1.0 mm)	8	8	8	7	8	6	5	4	5	6	8	9	82
Average relative humidity (%)	83	78	71	65	65	60	56	57	64	72	79	83	69
Mean monthly sunshine hours	81.1	106.9	155.2	199.2	250.5	291.3	334.0	312.2	241.0	176.5	111.1	75.9	2,334.9
Source 1: NOAA
Source 2: Deutscher Wetterdienst (extremes)

== History ==
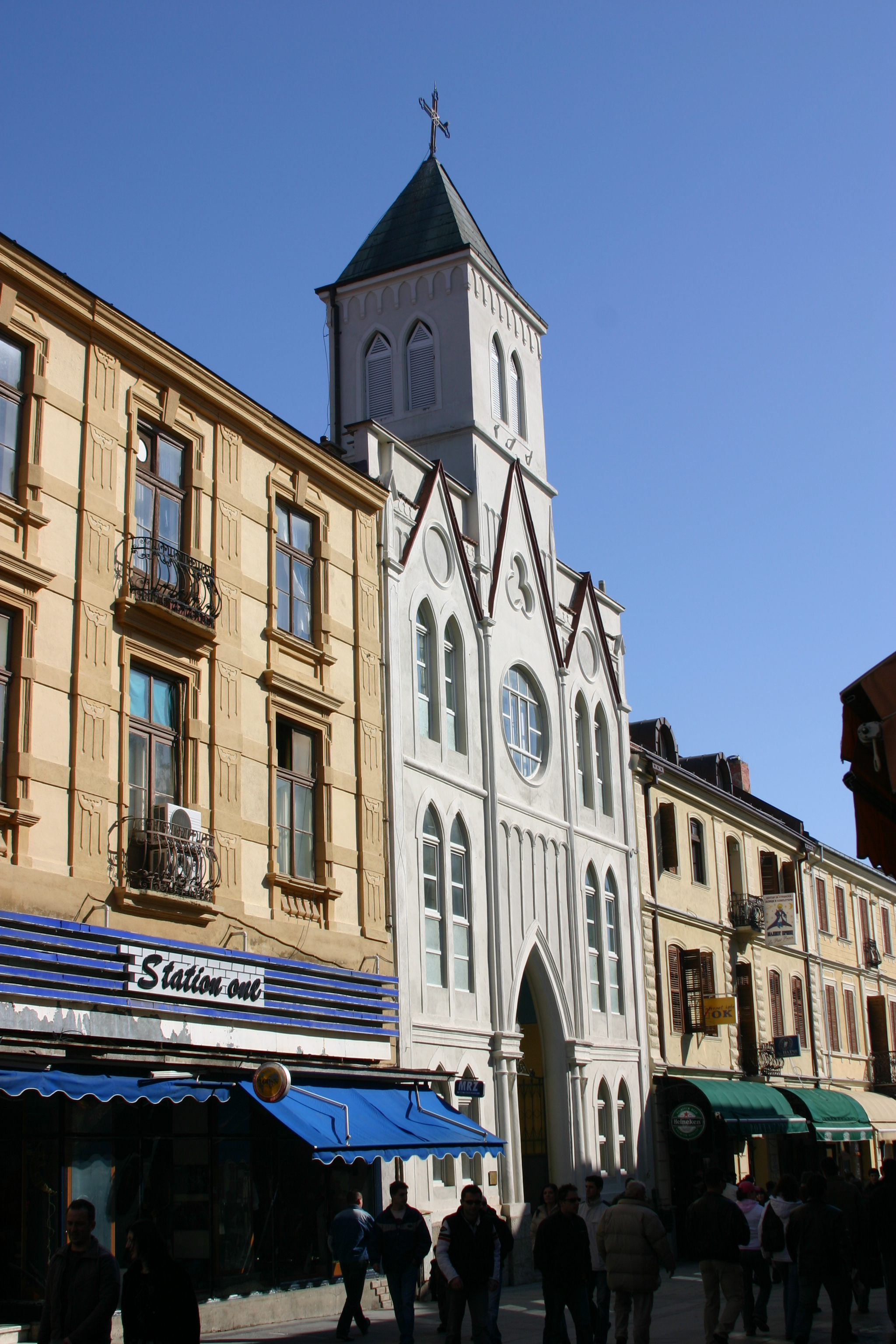
The Catholic Church "Holy Heart of Jesus", on the main street of Bitola.

=== Prehistory ===
There are a number of prehistoric archaeological sites around Bitola. The earliest evidence of organized human settlements are the archaeological sites from the early Neolithic period, among which the most important are the tells of Veluška Tumba and Bara Tumba near the village of Porodin, first inhabited around 6000 BC.

=== Ancient and early Byzantine periods ===
The region of Bitola was known as Lynkestis in antiquity, a region that became part of Upper Macedonia, and was ruled by semi-independent chieftains until the later Argead rulers of Macedon. The tribes of Lynkestis were known as Lynkestai. According to Nicholas Hammond, they were a Greek tribe belonging to the Molossian group of the Epirotes. There are important metal artifacts from the ancient period at the necropolis of Crkvište near the village of Beranci. A golden earring dating from the 4th century BC is depicted on the obverse of the Macedonian 10-denar banknote, issued in 1996.

Heraclea Lyncestis (Ancient Greek: Ἠράκλεια Λυγκηστίς - City of Hercules upon the Land of the Lynx) was an important settlement from the Hellenistic period till the early Middle Ages. It was founded by Philip II of Macedon by the middle of the 4th century BC, and named after the Greek hero Heracles. With its strategic location, it became a prosperous city. The Romans conquered this part of Macedon in 148 BC and destroyed the political power of the city. However, its prosperity continued mainly due to the Roman Via Egnatia road which passed near the city. A number of archaeological monuments from the Roman period can be seen today in Heraclea, including a portico, thermae (baths), a theater. The theatre was once capable of housing an audience of around 2,500 people.

In the early Byzantine period (4th to 6th centuries AD) Heraclea became an important episcopal centre. Some of its bishops were mentioned in the acts of the first Church Councils, including Bishop Evagrius of Heraclea in the Acts of the Sardica Council of 343. The city walls, a number of Early Christian basilicas, the bishop's residence, and a lavish city fountain are some of the remains of this period. The floors in the three naves of the Great Basilica are covered with mosaics with a very rich floral and figurative iconography; these well preserved mosaics are often regarded as one of the finest examples of the early Christian art in the region. During the 4th and 6th centuries, the names of other bishops from Heraclea were recorded. The city was sacked by Ostrogothic forces, commanded by Theodoric the Great in 472 AD and, despite a large gift to him from the city's bishop, it was sacked again in 479. It was restored in the late 5th and early 6th centuries. However, in the late 6th century the city suffered successive attacks by various tribes, and eventually the region was settled by the early Slavic peoples. Its imperial buildings fell into disrepair and the city gradually declined to a small settlement, and survived as such until around the 11th century AD.

=== Middle Ages ===
In the 6th and 7th centuries, the region around Bitola experienced a demographic shift as more and more Slavic tribes settled in the area. In place of the deserted theater, several houses were built during that time. The Slavs also built a fortress around their settlement. Bitola was a part of the First Bulgarian Empire from the middle of the 8th to the early 11th centuries, after which it again became part of the Byzantine Empire, and in turn was briefly part of the Serbian Empire during the 14th century. Arguably, a number of monasteries and churches were built in and around the city during the Medieval period (hence its other name Manastir).

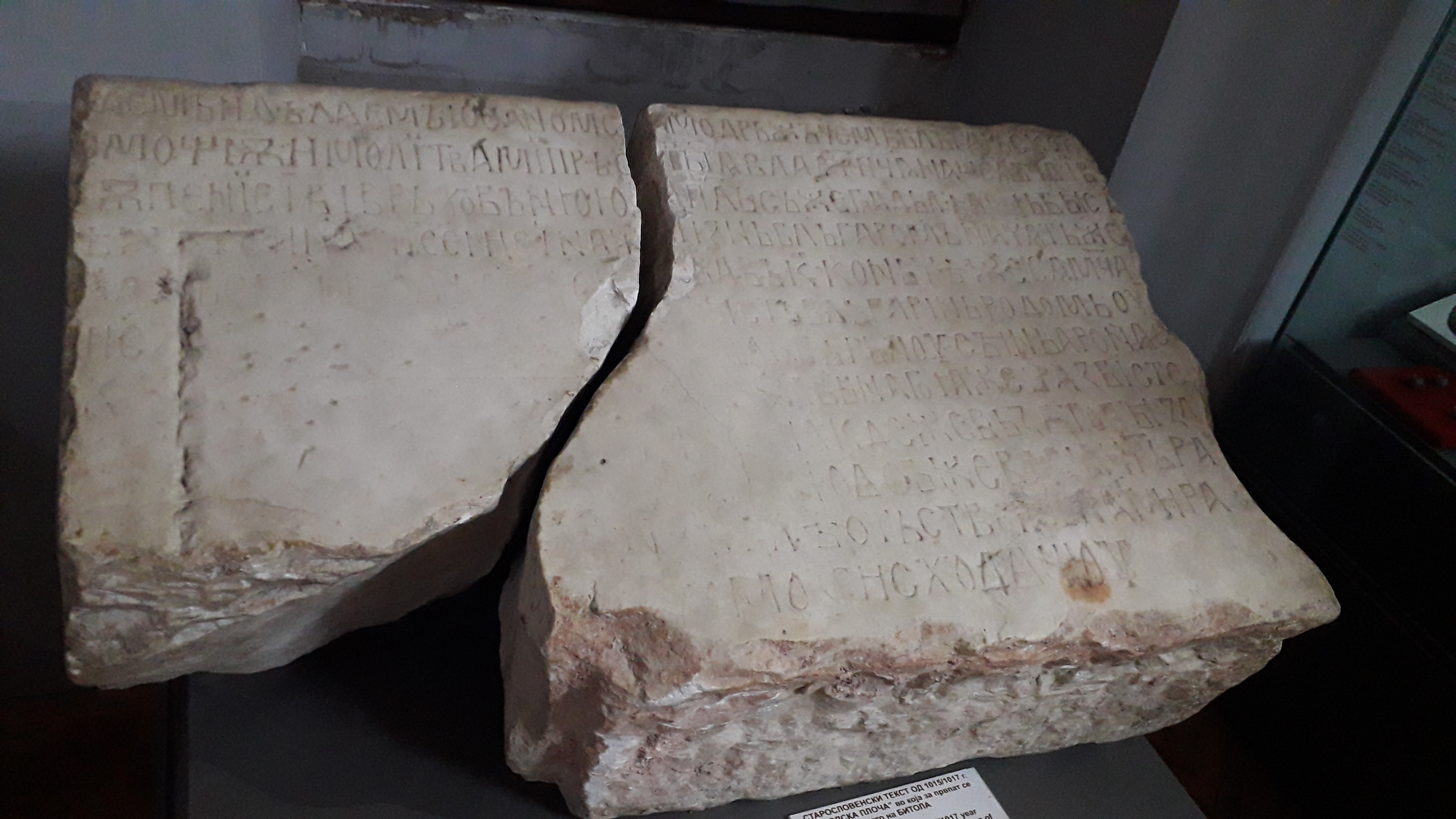
The Bitola inscription. The Slavic name of the city of Bitola is mentioned in the inscription for the first time. The inscription reveals a fortress was built as a haven for the Bulgarians.

In the 10th century, Bitola came under the rule of tsar Samuel of Bulgaria. He built a castle in the town, later used by his successor Gavril Radomir of Bulgaria. The town is mentioned in several medieval sources. John Skylitzes's 11th-century chronicle mentions that Emperor Basil II burned Gavril's castle in Bitola, when passing through and ravaging Pelagonia. The second chrysobull (1019) of Basil II mentioned that the Bishop of Bitola depended on the Archbishopric of Ohrid. During the reign of Samuil, the city was the seat of the Bitola Bishopric. In many medieval sources, especially Western, the name Pelagonia was synonymous with the Bitola Bishopric. According to some sources, Bitola was known as Heraclea since what once was the Heraclea Bishopric later became the Pelagonian Metropolitan's Diocese. In 1015, Tsar Gavril Radomir was killed by his cousin Ivan Vladislav, who then declared himself tsar and rebuilt the city's fortress. To commemorate the occasion, a stone inscription written in the Cyrillic alphabet was set in the fortress; in it the Slavic name of the city is mentioned: Bitol.

During the battle of Bitola in 1015 between a Bulgarian army under the command of the voivode Ivats and a Byzantine army led by the strategos George Gonitsiates, the Bulgarians were victorious and the Byzantine Emperor Basil II had to retreat from the Bulgarian capital Ohrid, whose outer walls were by that time already breached by the Bulgarians. Afterwards Ivan Vladislav moved the capital from Ohrid to Bitola, where he re-erected the fortress. However, the Bulgarian victory only postponed the fall of Bulgaria to Byzantine rule in 1018.

As a military, political and religious center, Bitola played a very important role in the life of the medieval society in the region, prior to the Ottoman conquest in the mid-14th century. On the eve of the Ottoman conquest, Bitola (Monastir in Ottoman Turkish) experienced great growth with its well-established trading links all over the Balkan Peninsula, especially with big economic centers like Constantinople, Thessalonica, Ragusa and Tarnovo. Caravans carrying various goods came and went from Bitola.

=== Ottoman rule ===
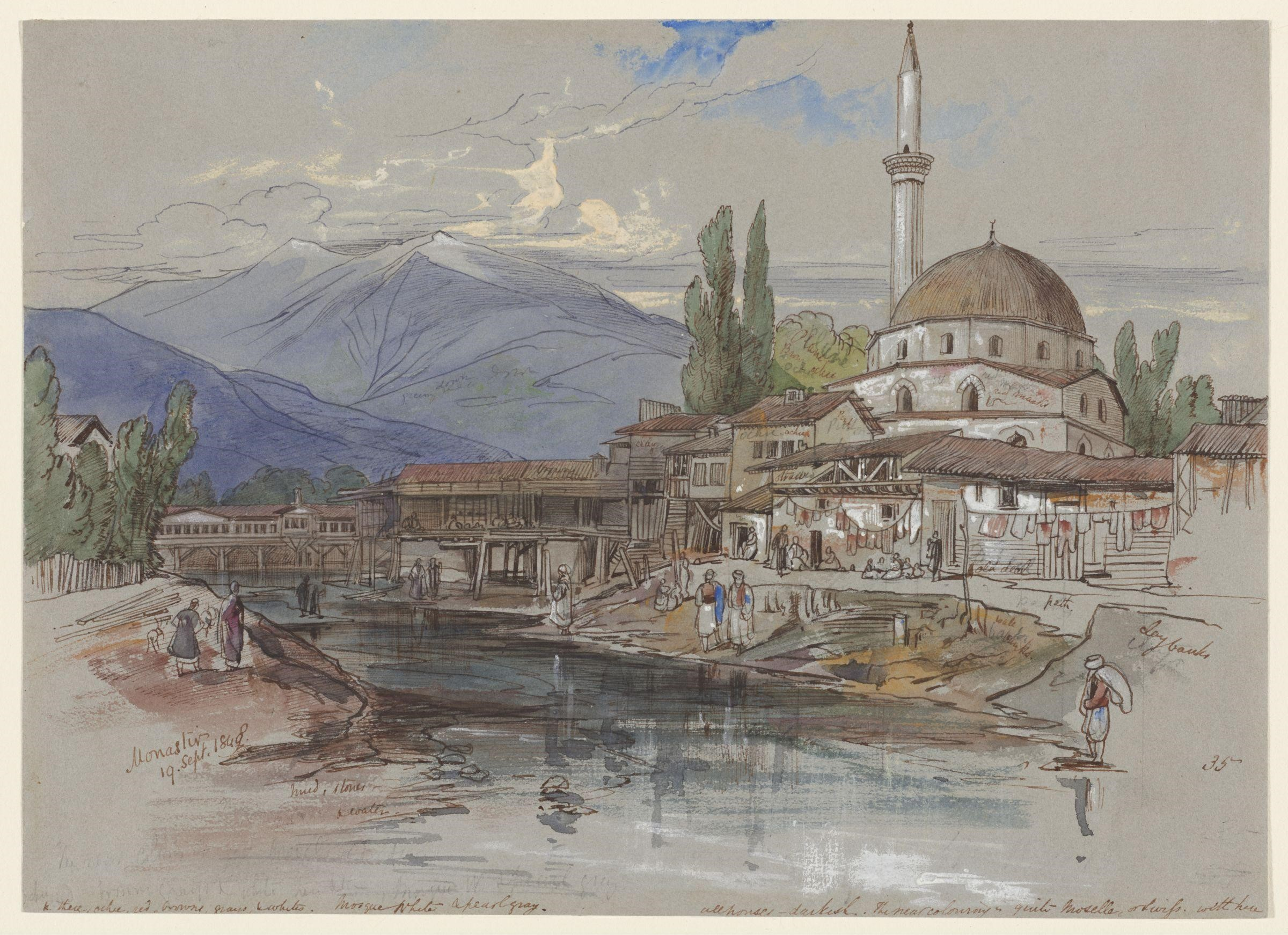
Bitola in the 19th century

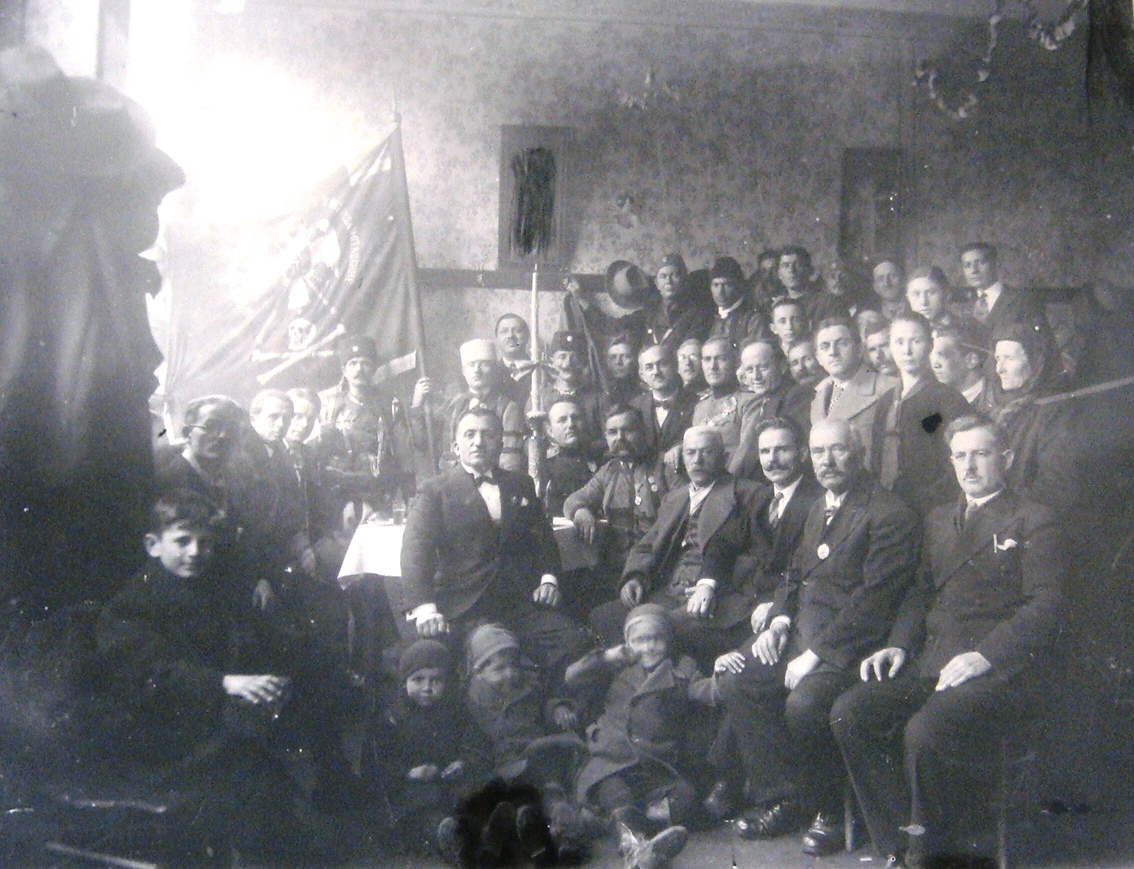
Board of the Chetnik Association for Freedom

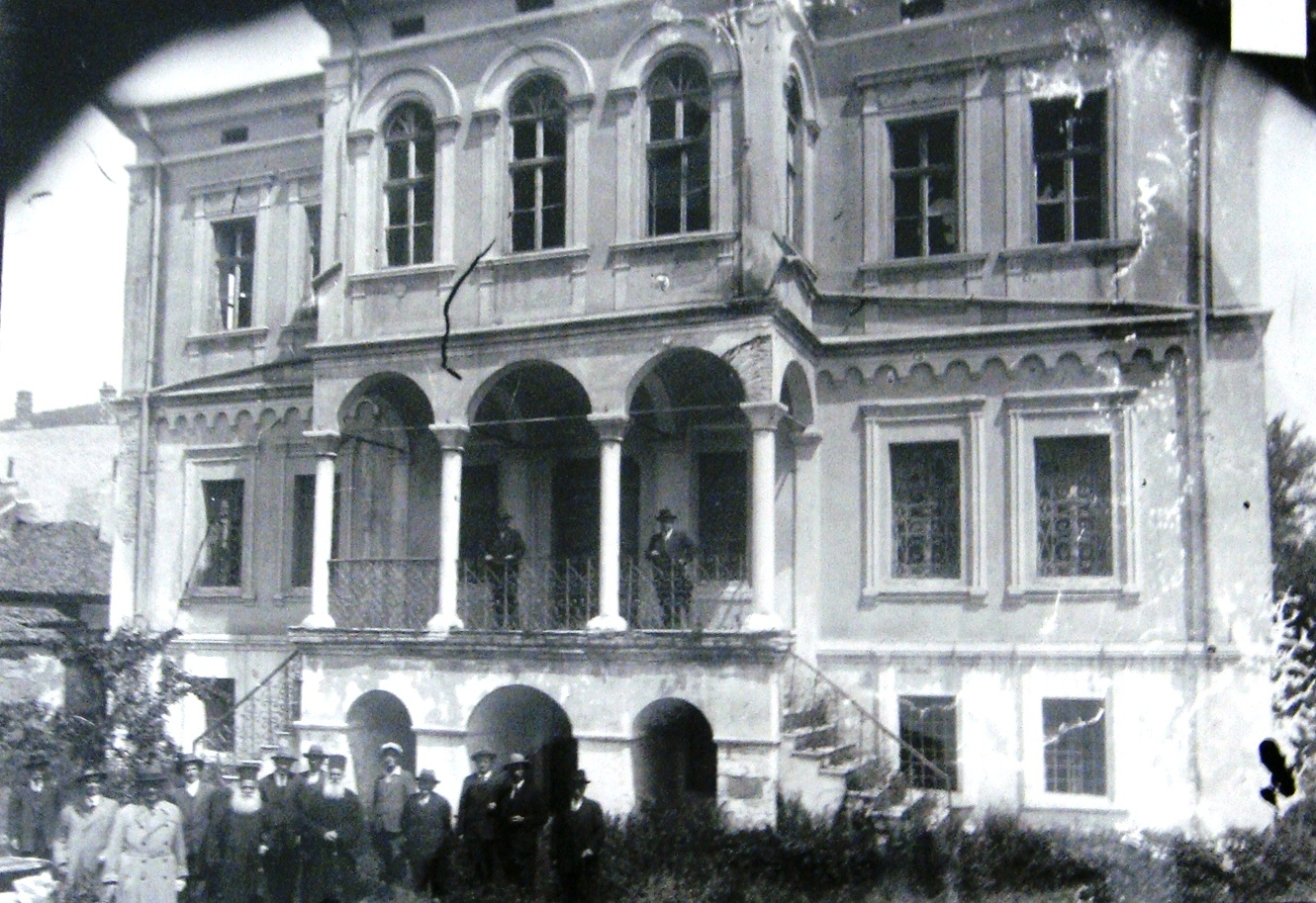
The Romanian High School of Bitola

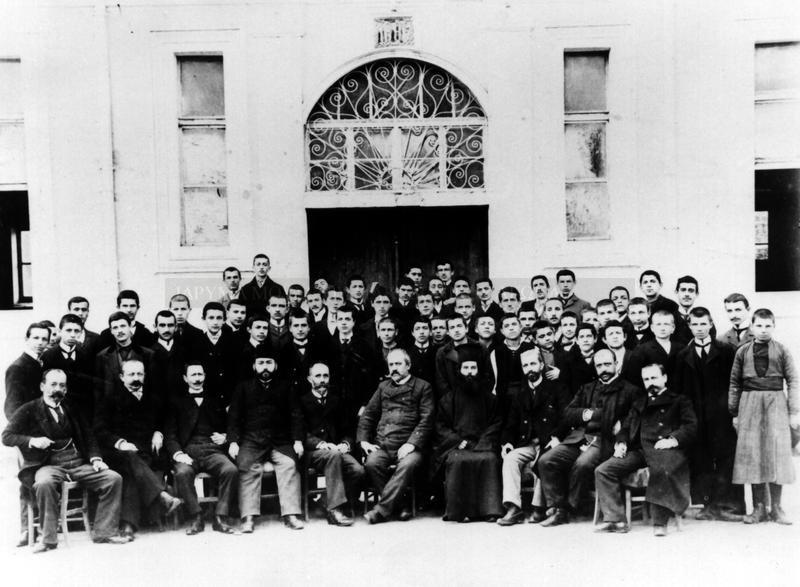
Greek school in Bitola, late 19th to early 20th century

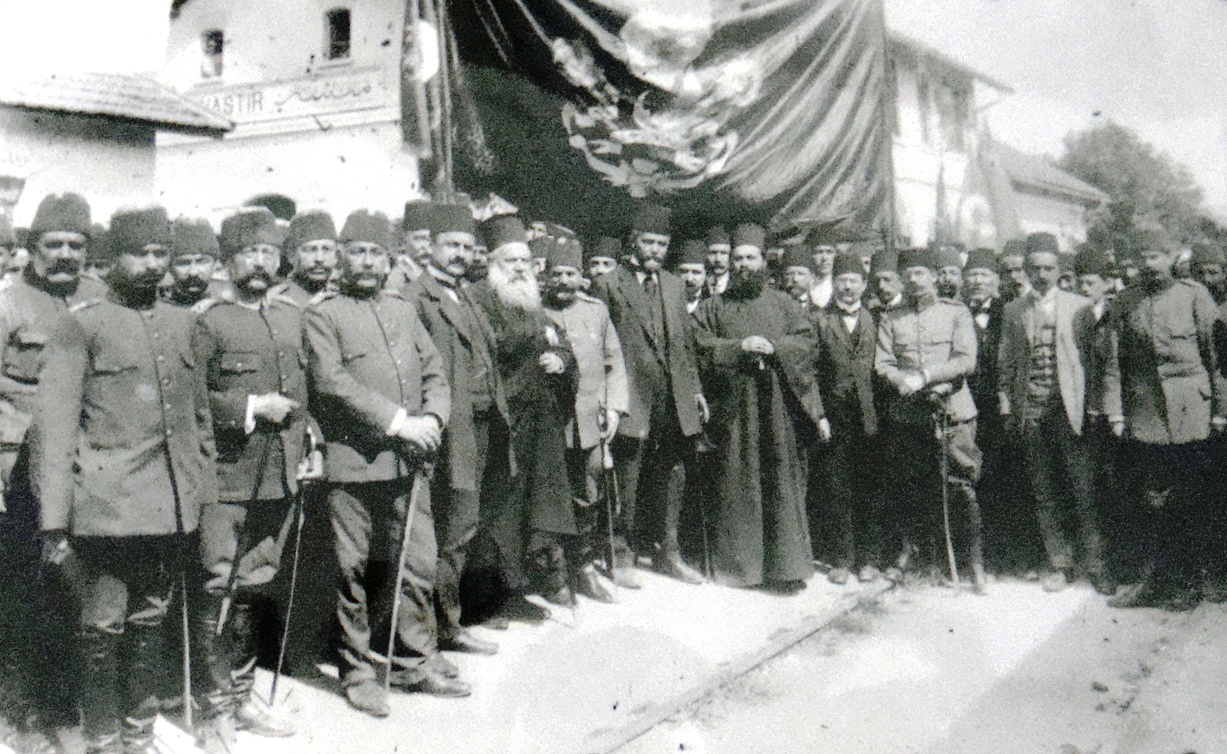
Reception Sultan Mehmed V Reşâd in the train station in Bitola, 1911

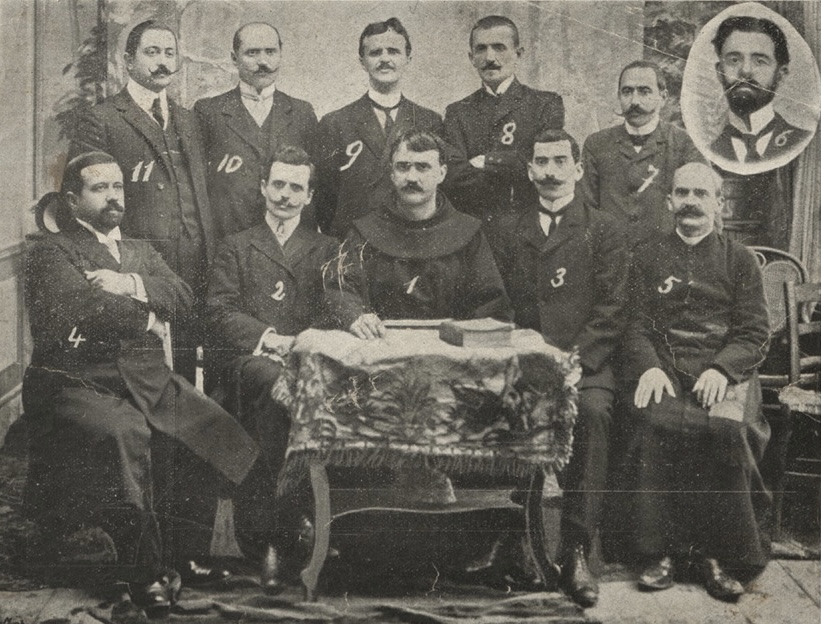
The Albanian academic Congress of Manastir

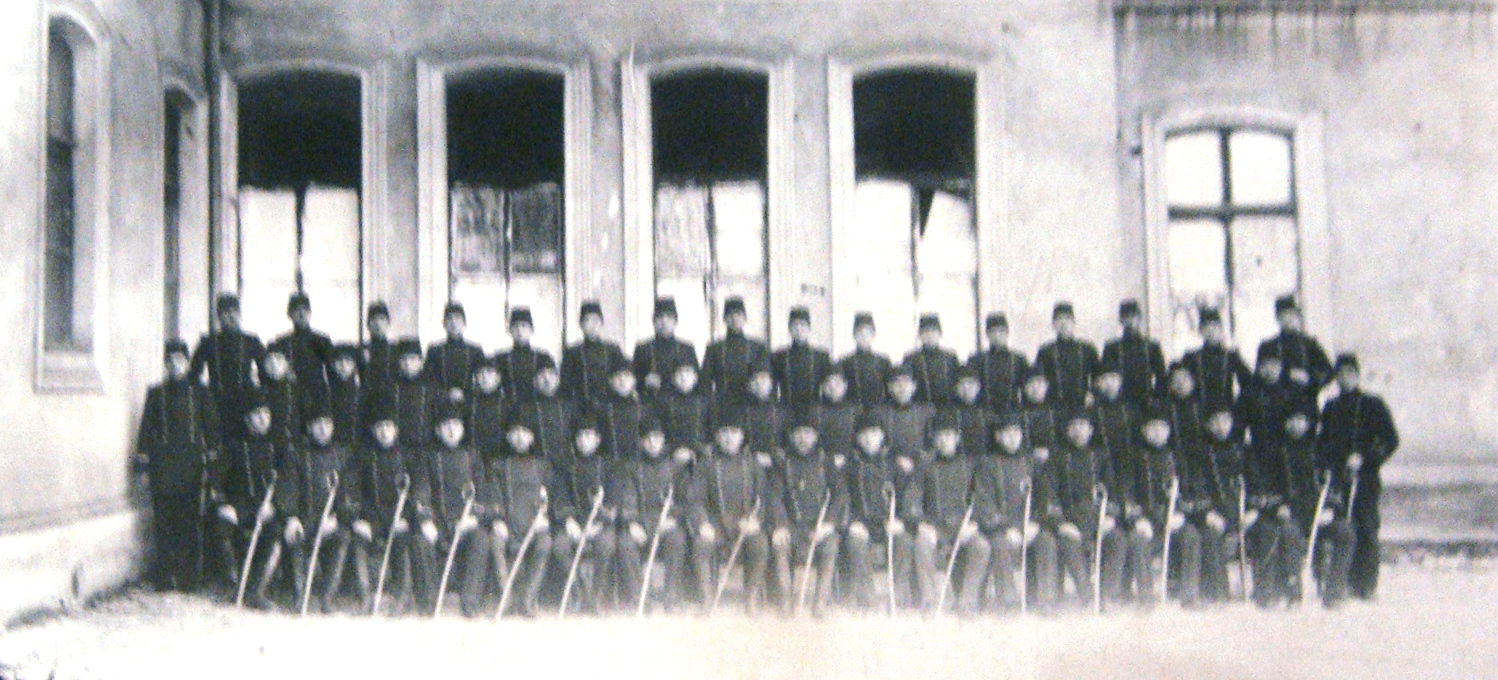
Turkish Military Academy (1909)

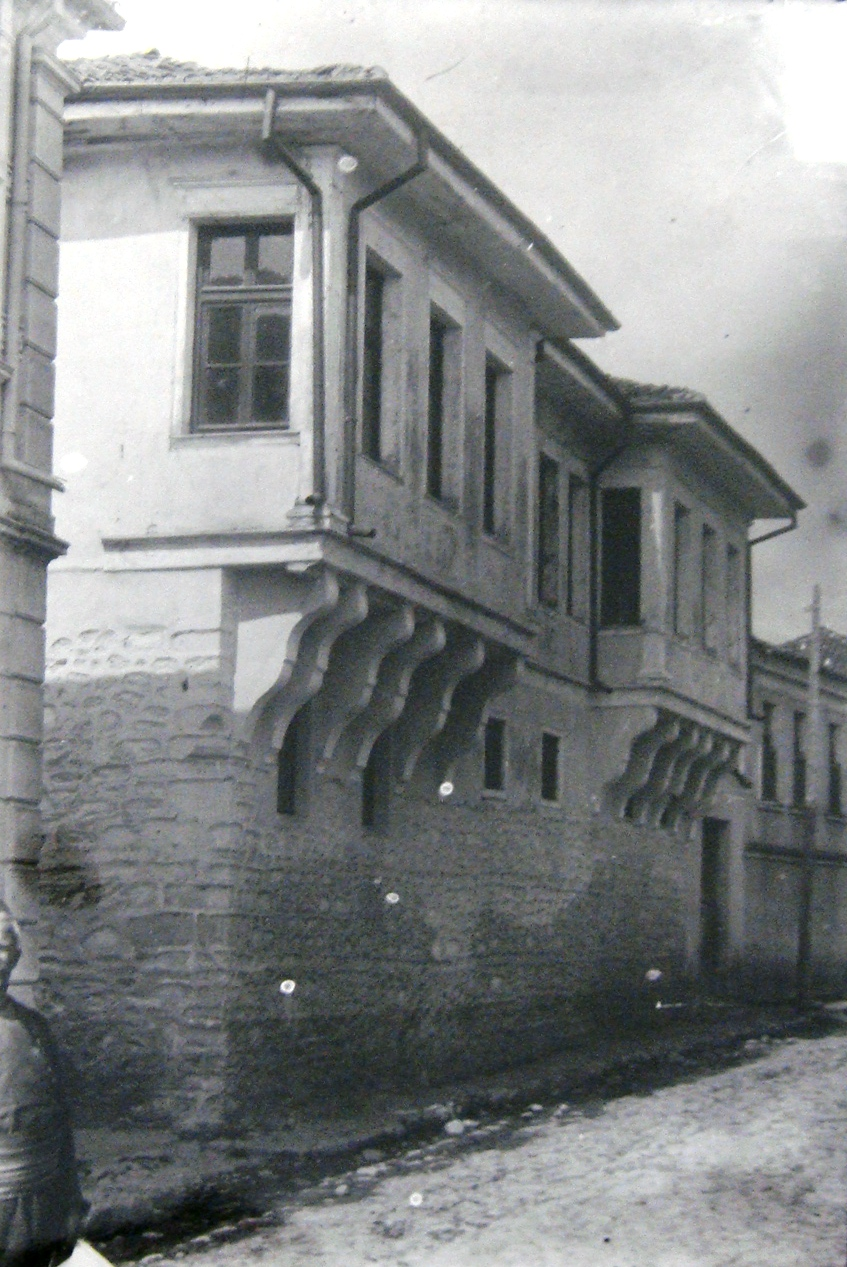
Turkish school

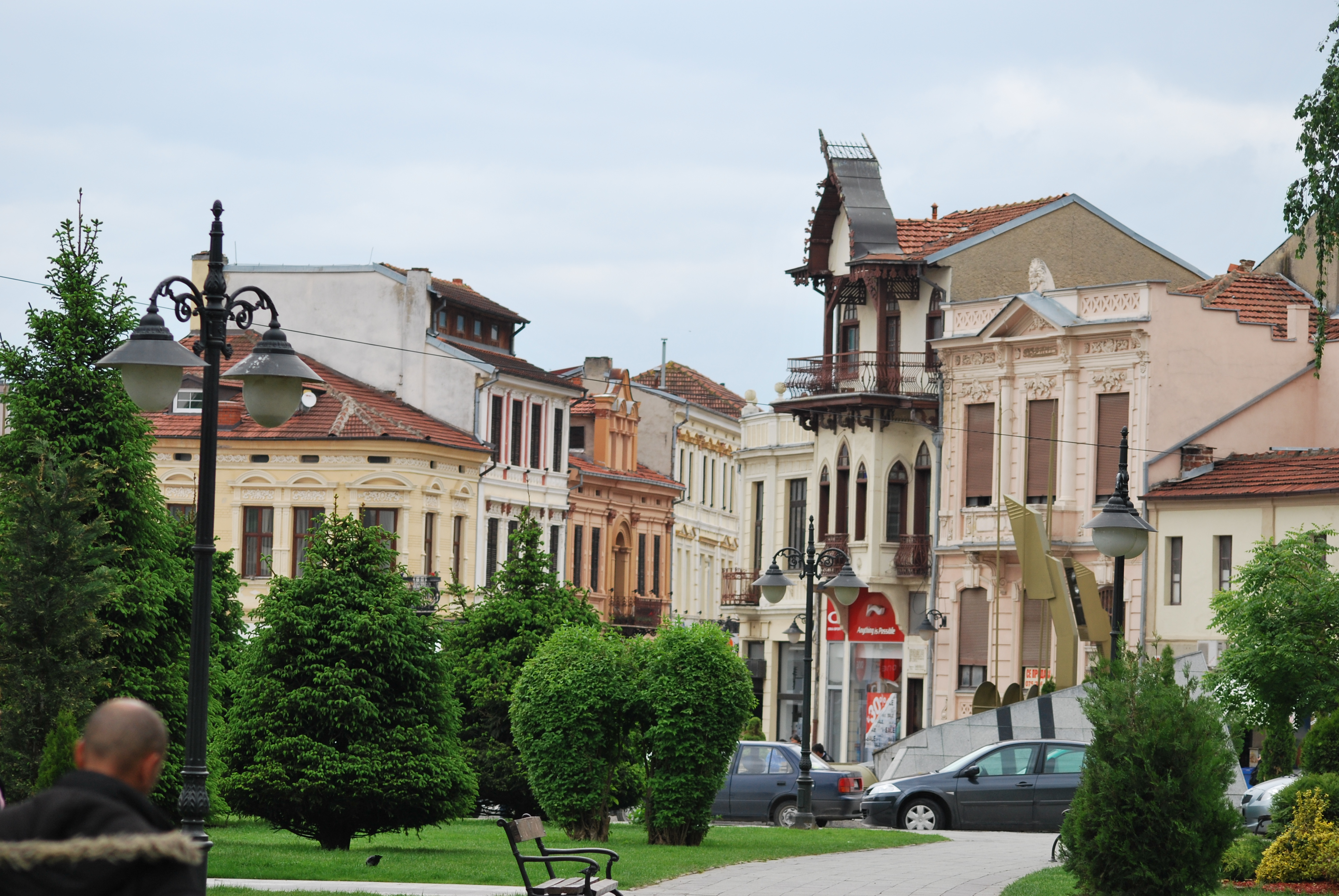
Typical neoclassical architecture from the 19th century

The city was conquered by the Ottomans in the mid-1380s.. From 1382 to 1912, Bitola was part of the Ottoman Empire, and was known as Monastir. Fierce battles took place near the city during the Ottoman conquest. Ottoman rule was completely established after the death of Prince Marko in 1395 when the Ottoman Empire established the Sanjak of Ohrid as a part of the Rumelia Eyalet and one of the earliest established sanjaks in Europe. Before it became part of the Ottoman Empire in 1395, Bitola was part of the realm of Prince Marko.

Initially, its county town was Bitola and later it was Ohrid, so it was sometimes referred to as the Sanjak of Monastir and sometimes as the Sanjak of Bitola.

After the Austro-Ottoman wars, the trade development and the overall prosperity of the city declined. But in the late 19th century, it again became the second-largest city in the wider southern Balkan region after Thessaloniki.

Between 1815 and 1822, the town was ruled by the Albanian Ali Pasha as part of the Pashalik of Yanina.

Starting from the second half of the 19th century, Bitola was the most important cultural center of the Aromanians. Throughout the 19th century, Bitola hosted the largest urban population of Aromanians in their native Balkans, with an estimated 10,000 to 18,000 Aromanians out of a total population of 40,000–50,000. Bitola thus gained the title of "New Moscopole", according to Macedonian Aromanian historian Nikola Minov. The Romanian High School of Bitola, a Romanian boarding high school for Aromanians, operated in Bitola until the early 20th century, and there was also an Aromanian library in the town. The Aromanian Sts. Constantine and Helen Church and a cemetery where important Aromanian figures such as Constantin Belimace or Apostol Mărgărit are buried still function in Bitola today.

During the Great Eastern Crisis, the local Bulgarian movement of the day was defeated when armed Bulgarian groups were repelled by the League of Prizren, an Albanian organisation opposing Bulgarian geopolitical aims in areas like Bitola that contained an Albanian population. Nevertheless, in April 1881, an Ottoman army captured Prizren and suppressed the League's rebellion.

In 1874, Manastır became the center of Monastir Vilayet which included the sanjaks of Debra, Serfidze, Elbasan, Manastır (Bitola), Görice and the towns of Kırcaova, Pirlepe, Florina, Kesriye and Grevena.

Traditionally a strong trading center, Bitola was also known as "the city of the consuls". In the final period of Ottoman rule (1878–1912), Bitola had consulates from twelve countries. During the same period, there were a number of prestigious schools in the city, including a military academy that, among others, was attended by the Turkish reformer Mustafa Kemal Atatürk. In 1883, there were 19 schools in Monastir, of which 11 were Greek, 5 were Bulgarian and 3 were Romanian. In Bitola, besides the schools where Ottomanism and Turkism flourished in the 19th century, schools of various nations were also opened. These institutions, which were very effective in increasing the education level and the rate of literacy, caused the formation of a circle of intellectuals in Bitola. Bitola was also the headquarters of many cultural organizations at that time.

In 1894, Manastır was connected with Thessaloniki by train. The first motion picture made in the Balkans was produced by the Aromanian Manakis brothers in Manastır in 1903. In their honour, the annual Manaki Brothers International Cinematographers Film Festival is held in Bitola since 1979.

In November 1905, the Secret Committee for the Liberation of Albania, a secret organization formed to fight for the liberation of Albania from the Ottoman Empire, was founded by Bajo Topulli and other Albanian nationalists and intellectuals. Three years later, the Congress of Manastir of 1908, which standardized the modern Albanian alphabet, was held in the city. The congress was held at the house of Fehim Zavalani. Mit'hat Frashëri was chairman of the congress. The participants in the Congress were prominent figures from the cultural and political life of Albanian-inhabited territories in the Balkans, and the Albanian diaspora.

=== Ilinden Uprising ===
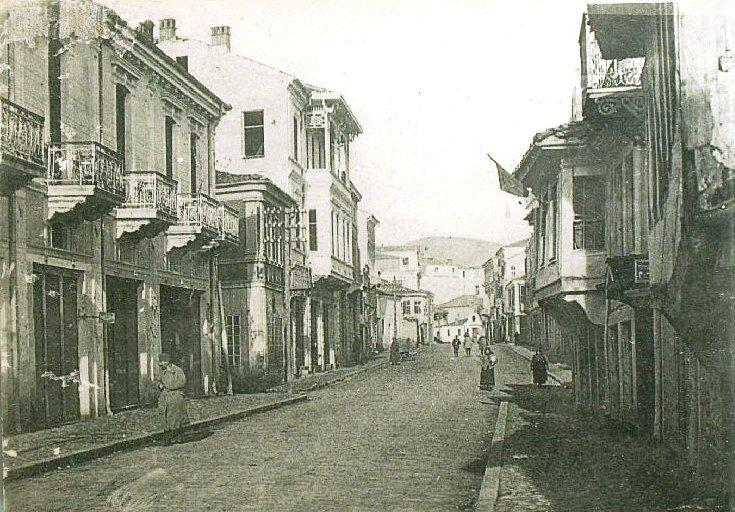
Street in Bitola in 1914

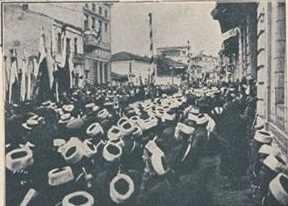
Celebration of the Ilinden Uprising in Bitola during the WWI Bulgarian occupation of Southern Serbia.

The Bitola region was a stronghold of the Ilinden Uprising. The uprising was conceived in 1903 in Thessaloniki by the Internal Macedonian Revolutionary Organization (IMRO). The uprising in the Bitola region was planned in Smilevo village in May 1903. Battles were fought in the villages of Bistrica, Rakovo, Buf, Skocivir, Paralovo, Brod, Novaci, Smilevo, Gjavato, Capari and others. Smilevo was defended by 600 rebels led by Dame Gruev and Georgi Sugarev. They were defeated and the villages were burned.

=== Balkan Wars ===
In 1912, Montenegro, Serbia, Bulgaria and Greece fought the Ottomans in the First Balkan War. After a victory at Sarantaporo, Greek troops advanced towards Monastir but were defeated by the Ottomans at Sorovich. The Battle of Monastir (16–19 November 1912) led to Serbian occupation of the city. According to the Treaty of Bucharest, 1913, the region of Macedonia was divided into three parts among Greece, Serbia and Bulgaria. Monastir was ceded to Serbia and its official name became the Slavic toponym Bitola.

=== World War I ===
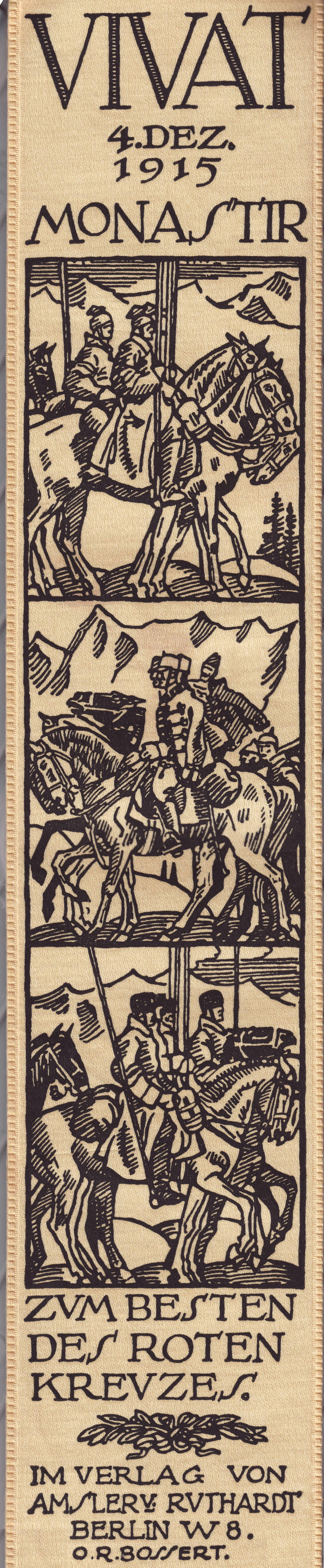
German Vivat ribbon commemorating the Bulgarian occupation (1915).

During World War I Bitola was on the Salonica front. Bulgaria, a Central Power, took the city on 21 November 1915, while the Allied forces recaptured it in 1916. Bitola was divided into French, Russian, Italian and Serbian sections, under the command of French general Maurice Sarrail. Until Bulgaria's surrender in late autumn 1918, Bitola remained a front line city and was bombarded almost daily by air bombardment and artillery fire and was nearly destroyed.

=== Inter-war period ===
At the end of World War I Bitola was restored to the Kingdom of Serbia, and, consequently, in 1918 became part of the Kingdom of Serbs, Croats and Slovenes, which was renamed Yugoslavia in 1929. Bitola became one of the major cities of the Vardarska banovina. On 18 April 1922, due to negligence by the Serbian army, a fire broke out in a warehouse with equipment of the army, leading to an explosion, which resulted in extensive material damage, 10 people killed and 14 people injured, 5 of whom were military personnel (two officers and three soldiers).

=== World War II ===
During World War II (1939–45), the Germans (on 9 April 1941) and Bulgarians (on 18 April 1941) took control of the city. But in September 1944, Bulgaria switched sides in the war and withdrew from Yugoslavia. On 4 November, the 7th Macedonian Liberation Brigade entered Bitola after the German withdrawal. The historical Jewish community, of Sephardic origin, lived in the city until World War II, when some were able to immigrate to the United States and Chile. On 11 March 1943 the Bulgarians deported the vast majority of the Jewish population (3,276 Jews) to Treblinka extermination camp. After the end of the war, PR Macedonia was established within FPR Yugoslavia.

=== Socialist Yugoslavia ===
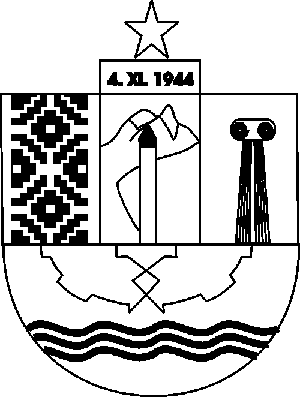
Former Coat of Arms of Bitola (1944–2006)

In 1945, the first Gymnasium (named "Josip Broz Tito") to use the Macedonian language, was opened in Bitola. In 1951–52, as part of an education campaign total of 40 Turkish language schools were opened in Debar, Kičevo, Kumanovo, Struga, Resen, Bitola, Kruševo and Prilep.

== Main sights ==
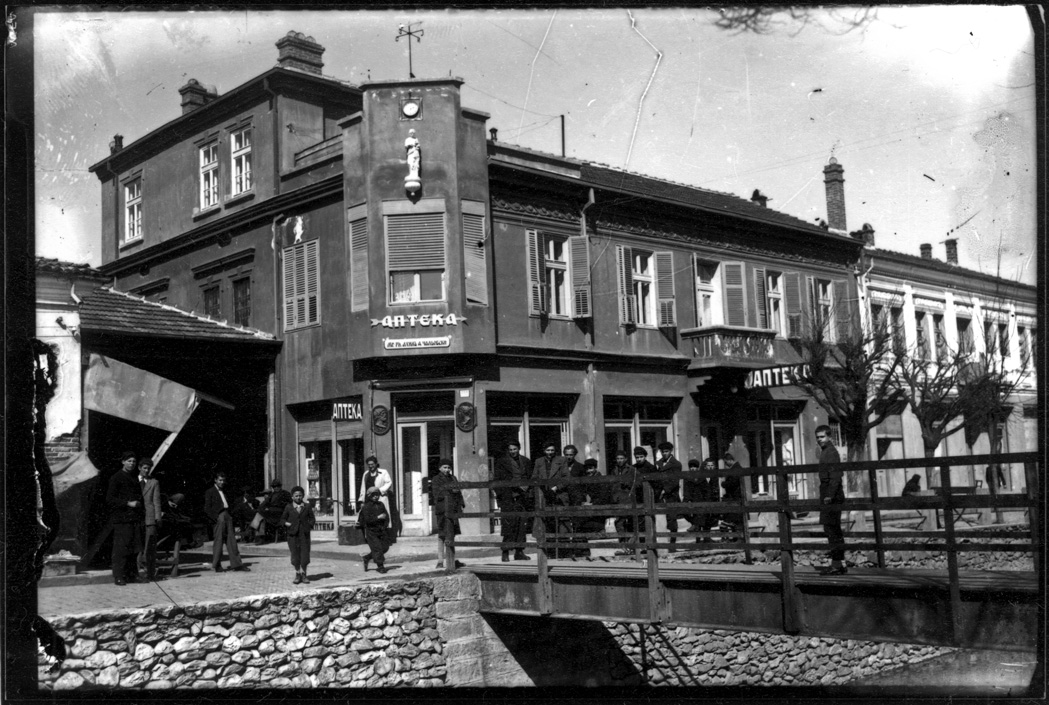
The building of Calovski pharmacy, glass disk (c. 1930)

The city has many historical building dating from many historical periods. The most notable ones are from the Ottoman age, but there are some from the more recent past.

=== Širok Sokak ===
Širok Sokak (Macedonian: Широк Сокак, meaning "Wide Alley") is a long pedestrian street that runs from Magnolia Square to the City Park.

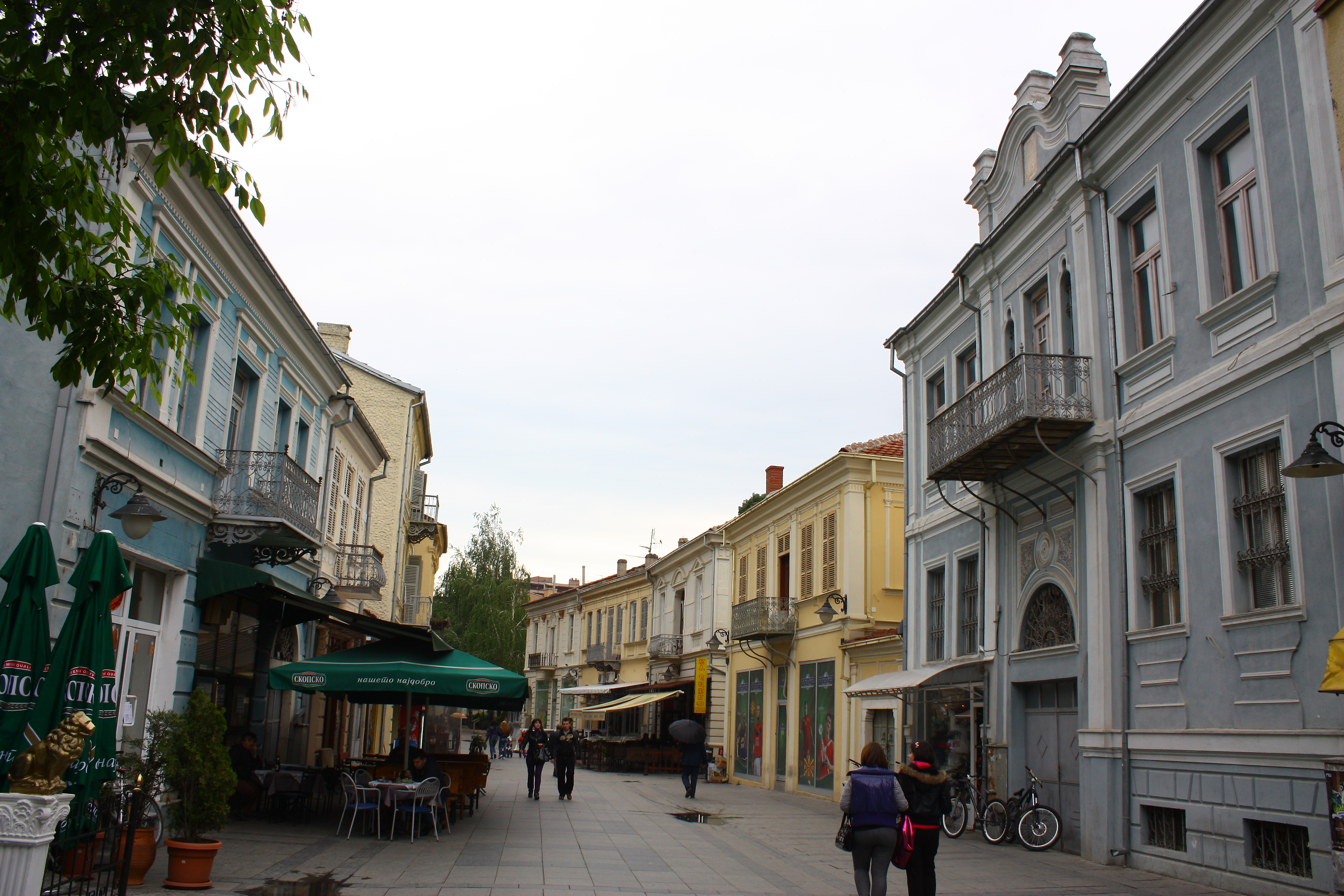
Traditional architecture in Bitola

=== Clock Tower ===
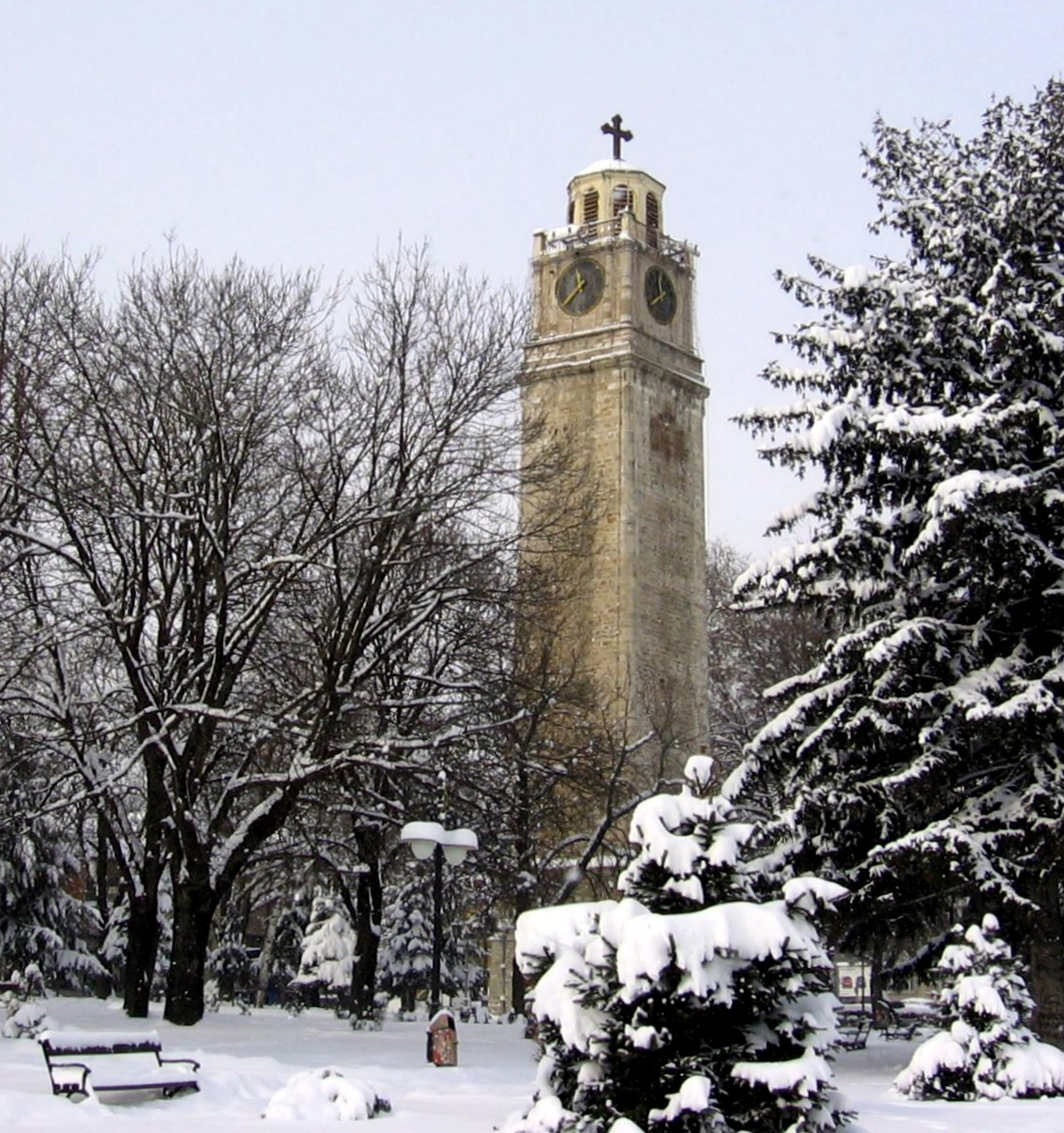
The clock tower in Bitola.

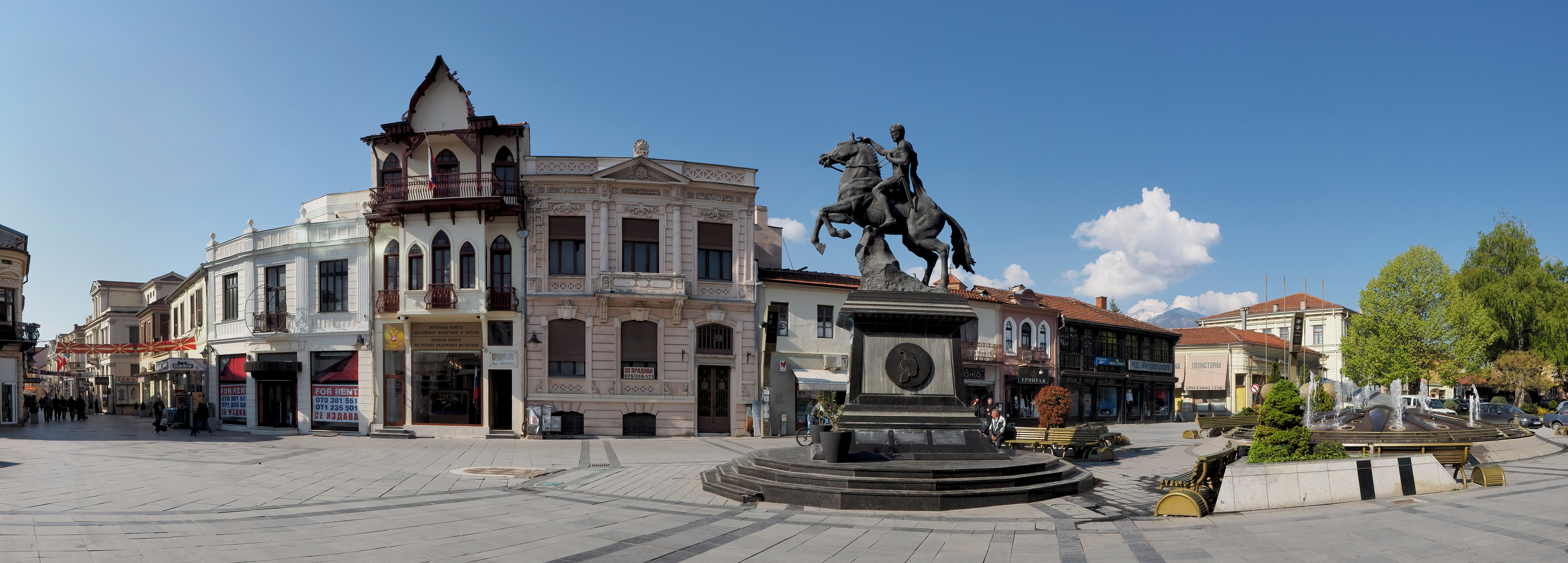
Magnolia Square with Russian Consulate

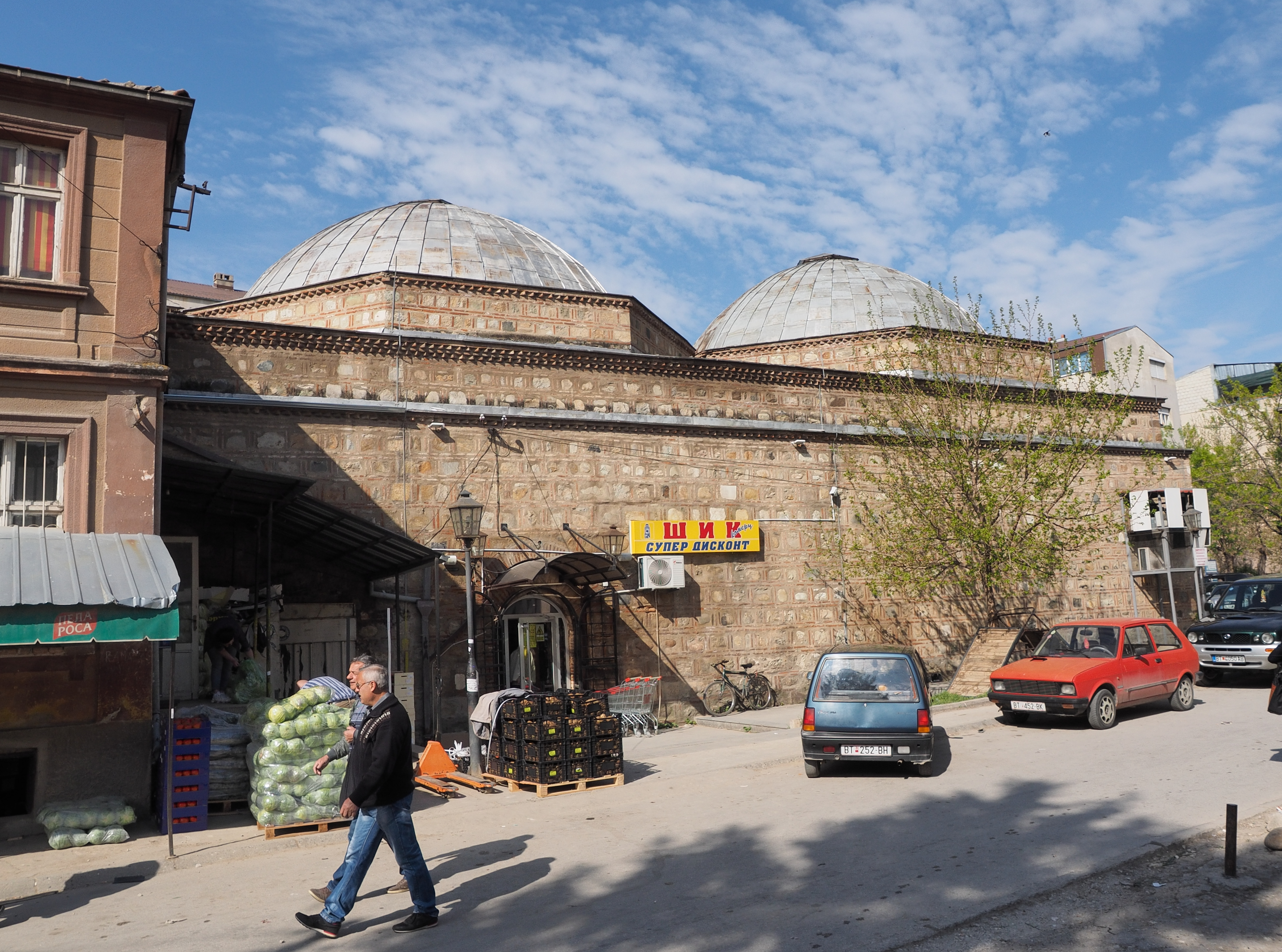
Hamam Deboj-hammam

It is unknown when Bitola's clock tower was built. Written sources from the 16th century mention a clock tower, but it is unclear if it is the same. Some believe it was built at the same time as St. Dimitrija Church in 1830. Legend says that the Ottoman authorities collected around 60,000 eggs from nearby villages and mixed them in the mortar to make the walls stronger.

The tower has a rectangular base and is about 30 meters high. Near the top is a rectangular terrace with an iron fence. On each side of the fence is an iron console construction which holds the lamps for lighting the clock. The clock is on the highest of three levels. The original clock was replaced during World War II with a working one, given by the Nazis because the city had maintained German graves from World War I. The massive tower is composed of walls, massive spiral stairs, wooden mezzanine constructions, pendentives and the dome. During the construction of the tower, the façade was simultaneously decorated with simple stone plastic.

=== Church of Saint Demetrius ===
The Church of Saint Demetrius was built in 1830 with the voluntary contributions of local merchants and craftsmen. It is plain on the outside, as all churches in the Ottoman Empire had to be, but lavishly decorated with chandeliers, a carved bishop throne and an engraved iconostasis on the inside. According to some theories, iconostasis is a work of the Mijak engravers. Its most impressive feature is the arc above the imperial quarters with modelled figures of Jesus and the apostles.

Other engraved wood items include the bishop's throne made in the spirit of Mijak engravers, several icon frames and five more-recent pillars shaped like thrones. The frescoes originate from two periods: the end of the 19th century and the end of World War I to the present. The icons and frescoes were created thanks to voluntary contributions of local businessmen and citizens. The authors of many of the icons had a vast knowledge of iconography schemes of the New Testament. The icons show a great sense of color, dominated by red, green and ochra shades. The abundance of golden ornaments is noticeable and points to the presence of late-Byzantine artwork and baroque style. The icon of Saint Demetrius is signed with the initials "D. A. Z.", showing that it was made by iconographer Dimitar Andonov the zograph in 1889. There are many other items, including the chalices made by local masters, a darohranilka of Russian origin, and several paintings of scenes from the New Testament, brought from Jerusalem by pilgrims.

The opening scenes of the film The Peacemaker were shot in the "Saint Dimitrija" church in Bitola, as well as some Welcome to Sarajevo scenes.

=== Heraclea Lyncestis ===
Heraclea Lyncestis (Macedonian: Хераклеа Линкестис) was an important ancient settlement from the Hellenistic period till the early Middle Ages. It was founded by Philip II of Macedon by the middle of the 4th century BC. Today, its ruins are in the southern part of Bitola, 2 km (1 mi) from the city center.

=== The covered bazaar ===
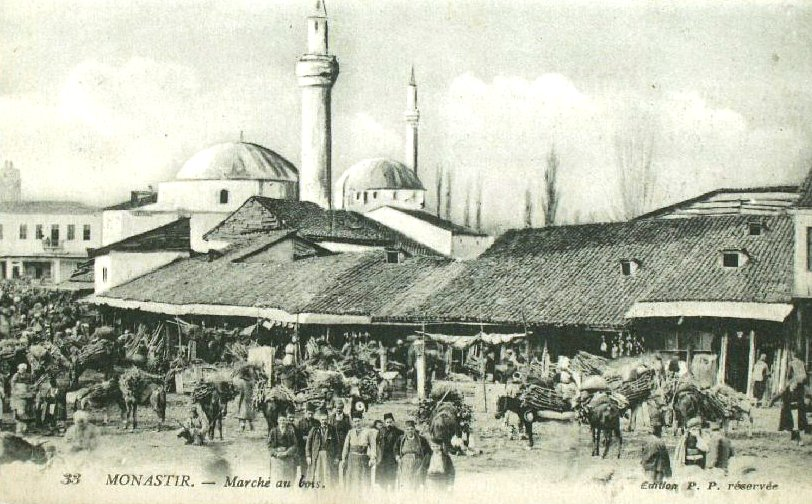
The Monastir bazaar in 1914

Situated near the city centre, the covered bedesten (Macedonian: Безистен) is one of the most impressive and oldest buildings in Bitola from the Ottoman period. With its numerous cupolas that look like a fortress, with its tree-branch-like inner streets and four large metal doors it is one of the biggest covered markets in the region.

It was built in the 15th century by Kara Daut Pasha Uzuncarsili, then Rumelia's Beylerbey. Although the bazaar appears secure, it has been robbed and set on fire, but has managed to survive. The bedisten, from the 15th to the 19th centuries, was rebuilt, and many stores, often changing over time, were located there. Most of them were selling textile and other luxurious fabrics. At the same time the Bedisten was a treasury, where in specially made small rooms the money from the whole Rumelian Vilaet was kept, before it was transferred into the royal treasury. In the 19th century the Bedisten contained 84 shops. Today most of them are contemporary and they sell different types of products, but despite the internal renovations, the outwards appearance of the structure has remained unchanged.

=== Gazi Hajdar Kadi Mosque ===
The Gazi Hajdar Kadi Mosque is one of the most attractive monuments of Islamic architecture in Bitola. It was built in the early 1560s, as the project of the architect Mimar Sinan, ordered by the Bitola kadija Ajdar-kadi. Over time, it was abandoned and heavily damaged, and at one point used as a stare, but recent restoration and conservation has restored to some extent its original appearance.

=== New Mosque, Bitola ===
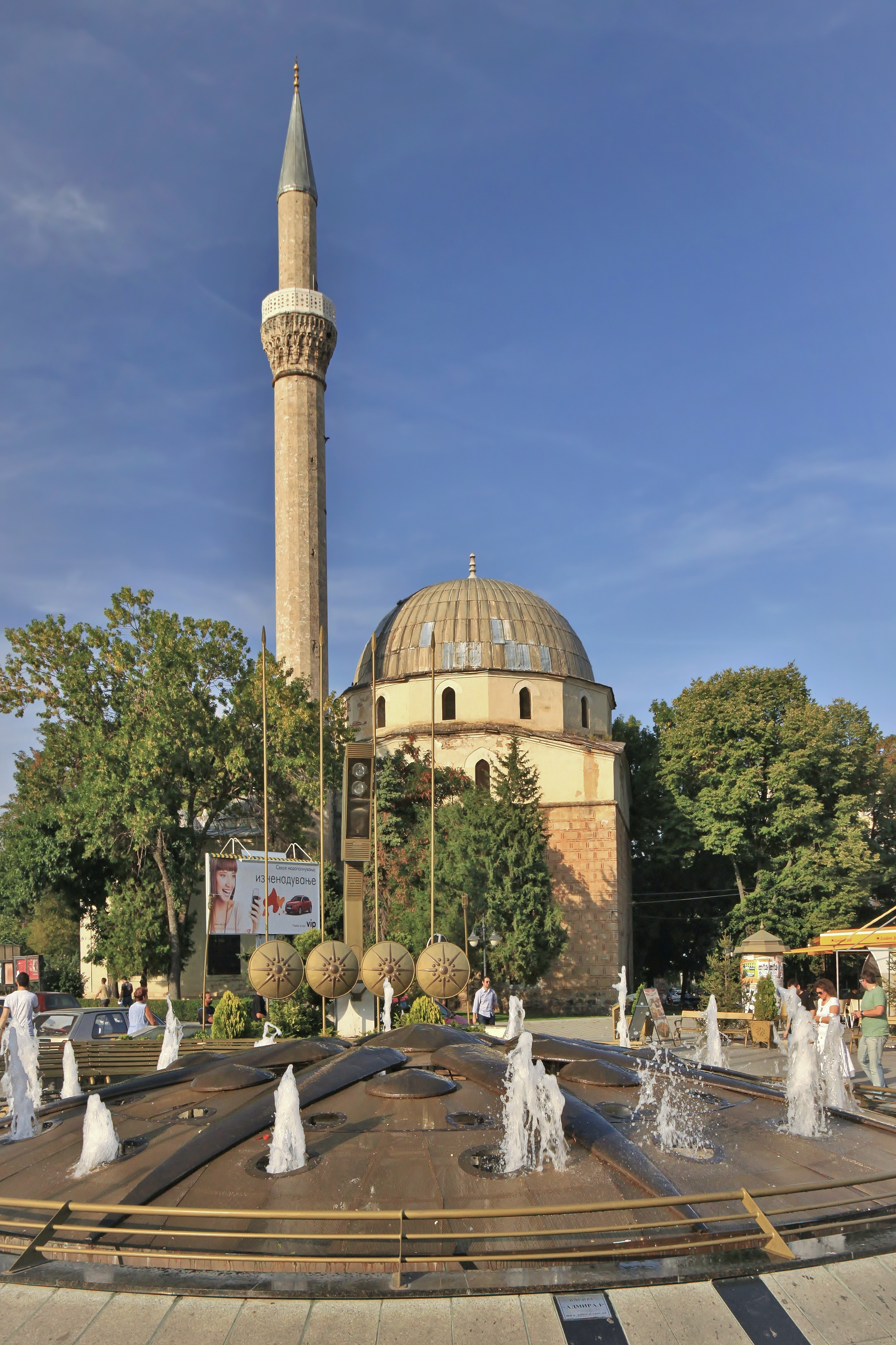
New Mosque, Bitola

The New Mosque is located in the center of the city. It has a square base, topped with a dome. Near the mosque is a minaret, 40 m high. Today, the mosque's rooms house permanent and temporary art exhibitions. Recent archaeological excavations have revealed that it has been built upon an old church.

=== Ishak Çelebi Mosque ===
The Ishak Çelebi Mosque is the inheritance of the kadi Ishak Çelebi. In its spacious yard are several tombs, attractive because of the soft, molded shapes of the sarcophagi.

=== The old bazaar ===
The old bazaar (Macedonian: Стара Чаршија) is mentioned in a description of the city from the 16th and the 17th centuries. The present bedisten does not differ much in appearance from the original one. The bedisten had eighty-six shops and four large iron gates. The shops used to sell textiles, and today sell food products.

=== Deboj Bath ===
The Deboj Bath is an Ottoman Empire-era hamam. It is not known when exactly it was constructed. At one point, it was heavily damaged, but after repairs it regained its original appearance: a façade with two large domes and several minor ones.

== Bitola today ==
Bitola is the economic and industrial center of southwestern North Macedonia. Many of the largest companies in the country are based in the city. The Pelagonia agricultural combine is the largest producer of food in the country. The Streževo water system is the largest in North Macedonia and has the best technological facilities. The thermoelectric power plant of REK Bitola (which is in the close proximity of the city) produces 59.78% of electricity in the country. The Frinko refrigerate factory was a leading electrical and metal company. Bitola also has significant capacity in the textile and food industries.

Bitola is also home to thirteen consulates, which gives the city the nickname "the city of consuls."

General consulates

- Bulgaria (since 2006)
- Greece (since 2006)

Honorary consulates

- Albania (since 2019)
- Austria (since 2014)
- Bosnia and Herzegovina (since 2014)
- France (since 1996)
- Hungary (since 2012)
- Montenegro (since 2008)
- Romania (since 2007)
- Serbia (since 2007)
- Turkey (since 1998)
- Ukraine (since 2011)

Former consulates

- Croatia (2006–2014)
- Slovenia (2005–2014)
- United Kingdom (2000–2014)
- Russia (2001–2023)

Italy has also expressed interest in opening a consulate in Bitola.

=== Media ===
There is only one television station in Bitola: Tera, few regional radio stations: the private Radio 105 (Bombarder), Radio 106,6, UKLO FM, Radio Delfin as well as a local weekly newspaper — Bitolski Vesnik.

== City Council ==
The Bitola Municipality Council (Macedonian: Совет на Општина Битола) is the governing body of the city and municipality of Bitola. The city council approves and rejects projects that would have place inside the municipality given by its members and the Mayor of Bitola. The Council consists of elected representatives. The number of members of the council is determined according to the number of residents in the community and can not be fewer than nine nor more than 33. Currently the council is composed of 31 councillors. Council members are elected for a term of four years.

Following the 2021 local elections, the City Council is constituted as follows:

Party / List	Seats	My Parliament
VMRO-DPMNE	13	My Parliament
SDSM	11	My Parliament
DUI	1	My Parliament
The Left	2	My Parliament
Independent politicians	3	My Parliament
DOM/LDP	1	My Parliament
Total	31	My Parliament

Examining matters within its competence, the Council set up committees. Council committees are either permanent or temporary.

Permanent committees of the council:

- Finance and Budget Committee;
- Commission for Public Utilities;
- Committee on Urban Planning, public works and environmental protection;
- Commission for social activities;
- Commission for local government;
- Commission to mark holidays, events and award certificates and awards;

== Sports ==
Sport center with Petar Miloševski Stadium in the back and swimming pool

The main football team is FK Pelister and they play at the Petar Miloševski Stadium.

Bitola's main handball club is RK Eurofarm Pelister. RK Eurofarm Pelister 2 is the second club from the city, with both teams playing their games at the Sports Hall Boro Čurlevski.

The main basketball club is KK Pelister, and they also compete at the Sports Hall Boro Čurlevski.

== Transport ==
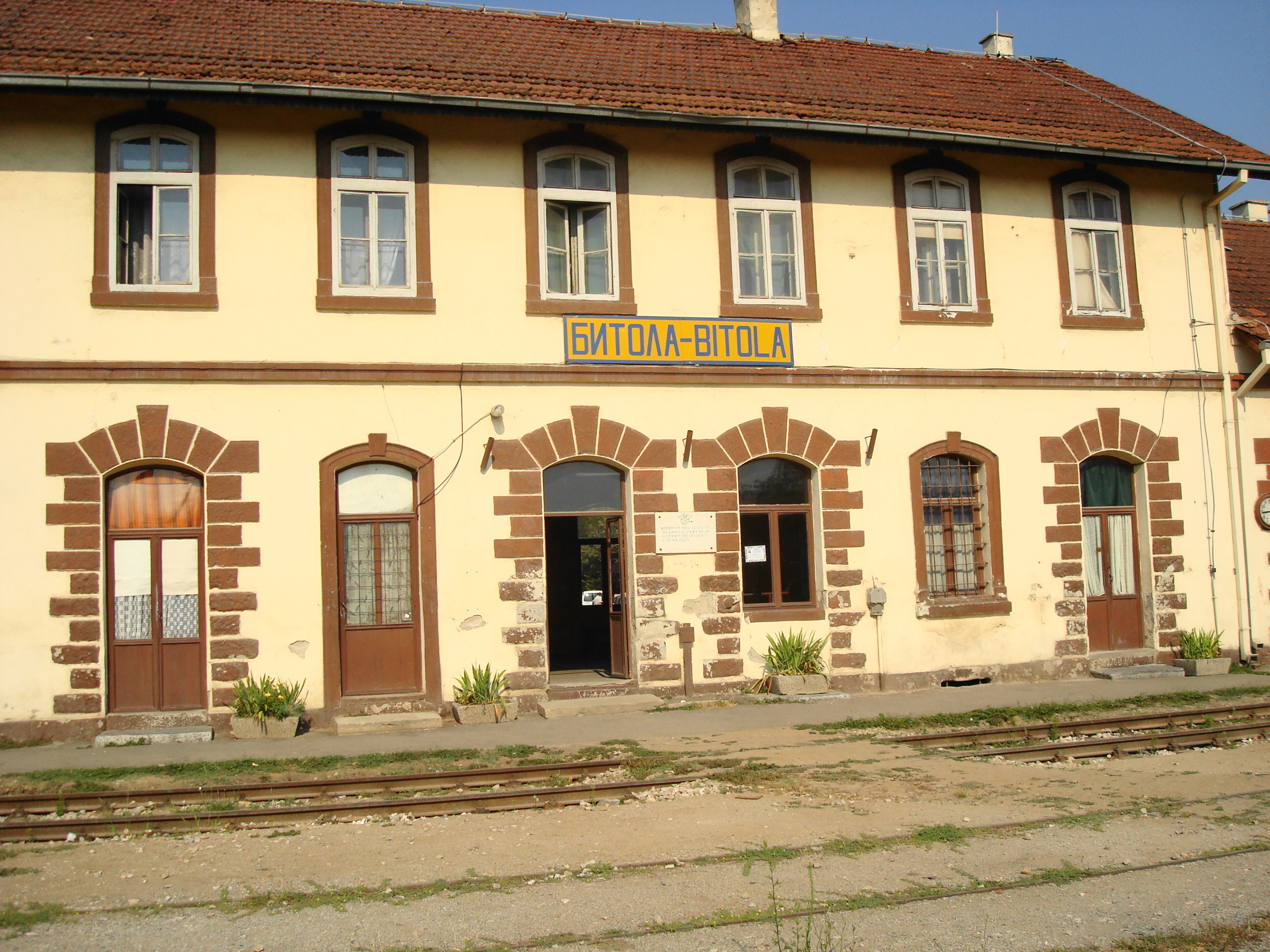
Bitola Railway station

The city is served by Bitola railway station, with service as far north as Belgrade.

== Demographics ==
Ethnic groups

Bitola's population was historically diverse. It numbered some 37,500 at the end of the 19th century. There were around 7,000 Aromanians, most of whom fully embraced the Hellenic culture, although some preferred the Romanian culture. Bitola also had a significant Muslim population - 11,000 (Turks, Roma, and Albanians) as well as a Jewish community of 5,200. The Slavic-speakers were divided between the Bulgarian Exarchate - 8,000, and the Greek Patriarchate - 6,300. A significant part of the Muslim Albanian population of Bitola was Turkified during Ottoman rule.

In statistics gathered by Vasil Kanchov in 1900, the city of Bitola was inhabited by 37,000 people, of whom 10,500 were Turks, 10,000 Christian Bulgarians, 7,000 Vlachs, 2,000 Romani, 5,500 Jews, 1,500 Muslim Albanians, 500 inhabitants of various other origins. The Bulgarian researcher Vasil Kanchov wrote in 1900 that many Albanians declared themselves as Turks. In Bitola, the population that declared itself Turkish "was of Albanian blood", but it "had been Turkified after the Ottoman invasion, including Skanderbeg", referring to Islamization.

During Ottoman times, Bitola had a significant Aromanian population, which according to some sources was larger than the Bulgarian and Jewish ones. In 1901, the Italian consul to the Ottoman Empire in Bitola said that "Undoubtedly, Koutzo-Vlach [Aromanian] population in Bitola is most significant in this town in terms of number of inhabitants, social status and importance in trade".

According to the statistics of the secretary of the Bulgarian Exarchate, Dimitar Mishev (" La Macédoine et sa Population Chrétienne "), in 1905 the Christian population of Bitola consisted of 8,844 Bulgarian Exarchists, 6,300 Greek Patriarchal Bulgarians, 72 Serboman Patriarchal Bulgarians, 36 Protestant Bulgarians, 100 Greeks, 7,200 Vlachs, 120 Albanians and 120 Gypsies. In the city there are 10 primary and 3 secondary Bulgarian schools, 7 primary and 2 secondary Greek, 2 primary and 2 secondary Romanian and 1 primary and 2 secondary Serbian schools.

According to a 1911 Ottoman census, there were 350,000 Greeks, 246,000 Bulgarians and 456,000 Muslims in the vilayet of Manastır, however the basis of the Ottoman censuses was the millet system where people were assigned an ethnicity according to their religion. Therefore, all Sunni Muslims were categorised as "Turks" even though many of them were Albanians, while all members of the Greek Orthodox church were listed as "Greeks" although this group was composed of Aromanians, Slavs, and Tosk Albanians, in addition to the Greeks which were numbered at ~100,000. The Slavic-speakers were divided between the Bulgarian majority and a small Serbian minority.

Bulgarian ethnographer Jordan Ivanov, professor at the University of Sofia, wrote in 1915 that Albanians, since they did not have their own alphabet, lacked a consolidated national consciousness and were influenced by foreign propaganda, declared themselves as Turks, Greeks and Bulgarians, depending on which religion they belonged to. Ivan further stated that Albanians were losing their mother tongue in Bitola. German linguist Gustav Weigand describes the process of Turkification of the Albanian urban population in his 1923 work Ethnographie Makedoniens (Ethnography of Macedonia). He writes that in the cities, especially noting Bitola, many of the Turkish inhabitants are in fact Albanians, being distinguished by the difference in articulation of certain Turkish words, as well as their clothing and tool use. They speak Albanian at home, however use Turkish when in public. They refer to themselves as Turks, the term at the time also being a synonym for Muslim, with ethnic Turks referring to them as Turkoshak (Turkish: Türk uşak, English: Turkish lad/boy or Turkish servant), a derogatory term for someone portraying themselves as Turkish.

According to the 1948 census Bitola had 30,761 inhabitants. 77.2% (or 23,734 inhabitants) were Macedonians, 11.5% (or 3,543 inhabitants) were Turks, 4.3% (or 1,327 inhabitants) were Albanians, 3% (or 912 inhabitants) were Serbs and 1.3% (or 402 inhabitants) were Aromanians. As of 2021, the city of Bitola has 69,287 inhabitants and the ethnic composition is the following:

In the 1953 census, large portions of Albanians declared themselves as ethnic Turks. In the municipality of Bitola, 13,166 Albanians were registered in 1948 and 4,014 in 1953, with the Turkish community going from 14,050 members in 1948, to numbering 29,151 in 1953.

City of Bitola population according to ethnic group 1948–2002
Ethnic group	census 1948		census 1953		census 1961		census 1971		census 1981		census 1994		census 2002		census 2021	
Ethnic group	Number	%	Number	%	Number	%	Number	%	Number	%	Number	%	Number	%	Number	%
Macedonians	23,734	77.2	28,912	77.0	43,108	88.0	57,282	88.1	68,897	87.8	70,528	91.0	66,038	88.6	55,995	80.8
Romani	..	..	3	0.0	..	..	28	0.0	535	0.7	1,676	2.2	2,577	3.5	2,862	4.1
Albanians	1,327	4.3	484	1.3	378	0.8	1,317	2.0	2,347	3.0	1,967	2.5	2,360	3.2	2,441	3.5
Turks	3,543	11.5	6,189	16.5	3,265	6.7	3,061	4.7	3,068	3.9	1,547	2.0	1,562	2.1	1,115	1.6
Aromanians	420	1.4	482	1.3	..	..	..	..	543	0.7	696	0.9	997	1.3	1,003	1.4
Serbs	912	3.0	834	2.2	1,035	2.1	1,143	1.8	843	1.1	556	0.7	499	0.7	321	0.5
Bosniaks	0	0.0	0	0.0	0	0.0	0	0.0	0	0.0	0	0.0	20	0.3	0.0	0.1
Others	825	2.7	660	1.8	1,215	2.5	2,204	3.4	2,274	2.9	494	0.6	497	0.7	729	1.1
PWDTFAS*															4,774	6.9
Total	30,761		37,564		49,001		65,035		78,507		77,464		74,550		69,287	

- PWDTFAS-Persons for whom data are taken

Language

According to the 2002 census the most common languages in the city are the following:

Languages
Macedonian	92.9%
Albanian	3.2%
Turkish	1.9%
Aromanian	0.7%
Serbian	0.5%
Romani	0.4%
Bosnian	0.01%
Others	0.4%

Language	Total number	% from total population
Macedonian	69.255	92.9
Albanian	2.399	3.2
Turkish	1.392	1.9
Aromanian	548	0.7
Serbian	390	0.5
Romani	287	0.4
Bosnian	10	0.01
Others	269	0.4

Religion

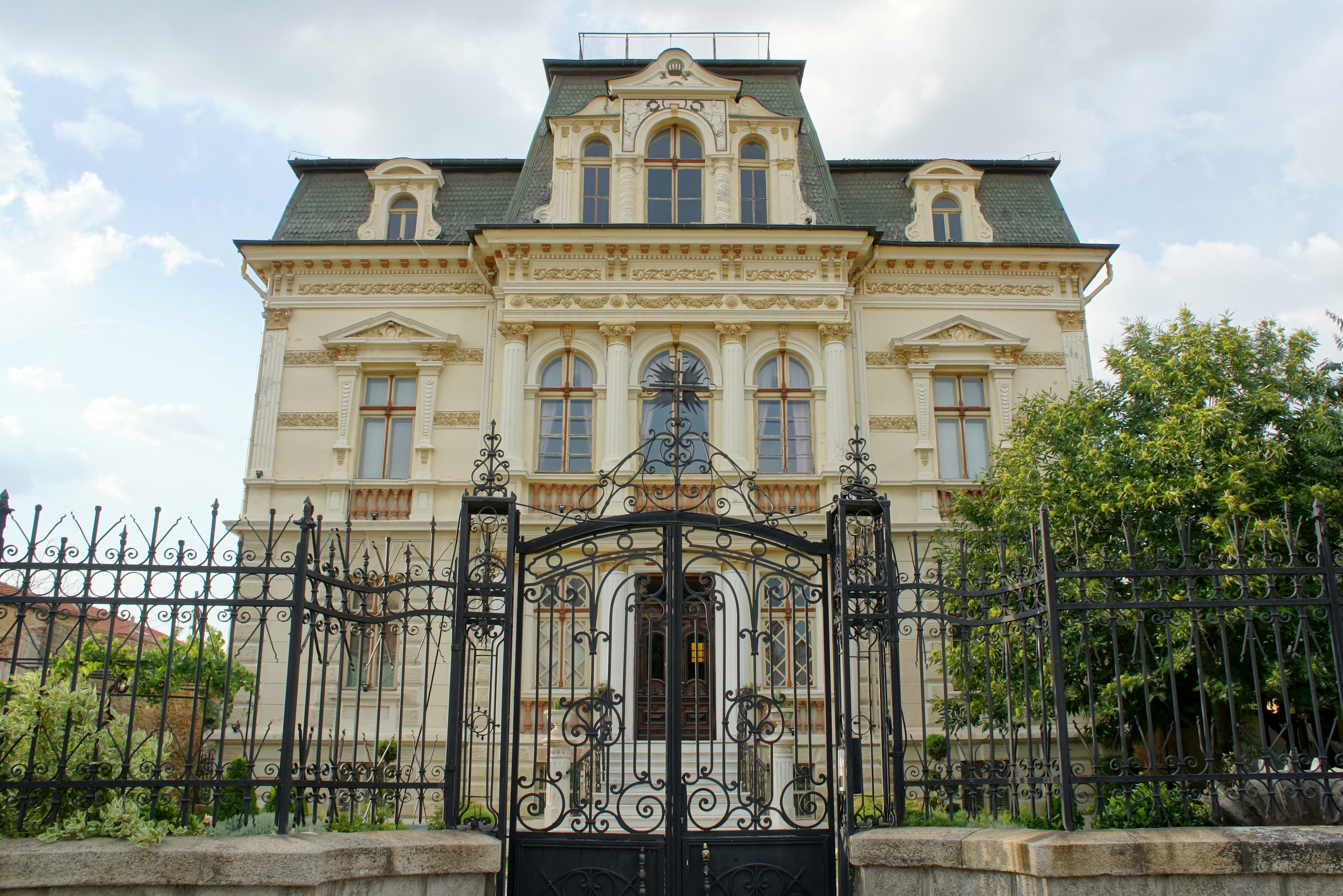
The seat of Prespa- Pelagonia diocese of the Macedonian Orthodox Church - Ohrid Archbishopric in Bitola

Bitola is a bishopric city and the seat of the Diocese of Prespa- Pelagonia. In World War II the diocese was named Ohrid - Bitola. With the restoration of the autocephaly of the Macedonian Orthodox Church in 1967, it got its present name Prespa- Pelagonia diocese which covers the following regions and cities: Bitola, Resen, Prilep, Krusevo and Demir Hisar.

The diocese's first bishop (1958 - 1979) was Mr. Kliment. The second and current bishop and administrator of the diocese, who has been bishop since 1981 is Mr. Petar. The Prespa- Pelagonia diocese has about 500 churches and monasteries. In the last ten years in the diocese have been built or are being built about 40 churches and 140 church buildings. The diocese has two church museums- the cathedral "St. Martyr Demetrius" in Bitola and at the Church "St. John" in Krusevo and permanent exhibition of icons and libraries in the building of the seat of the diocese. The seat building was built between 1901 and 1902 and is an example of baroque architecture. Besides the dominant Macedonian Orthodox Church in Bitola there are other major religious groups such as the Islamic community, the Roman Catholic Church and others.

According to the 2002 census the religious composition of the city is the following:

Religion
Orthodox	89.2%
Islam	9.2%
Catholicism	0.2%
Protestantism	0.01%
Others	1.4%

Religion	Total number	% from total population
Orthodox	66.492	89.2
Muslims	6.843	9.2
Catholics	140	0.2
Protestants	9	0.01
Others	1.066	1.4

- Bitola's Cathedral of the Sacred Heart of Jesus is the co-cathedral of the Roman Catholic Diocese of Skopje.

== Culture ==
Bitola has been part of the UNESCO Creative Cities Network since December 2015.

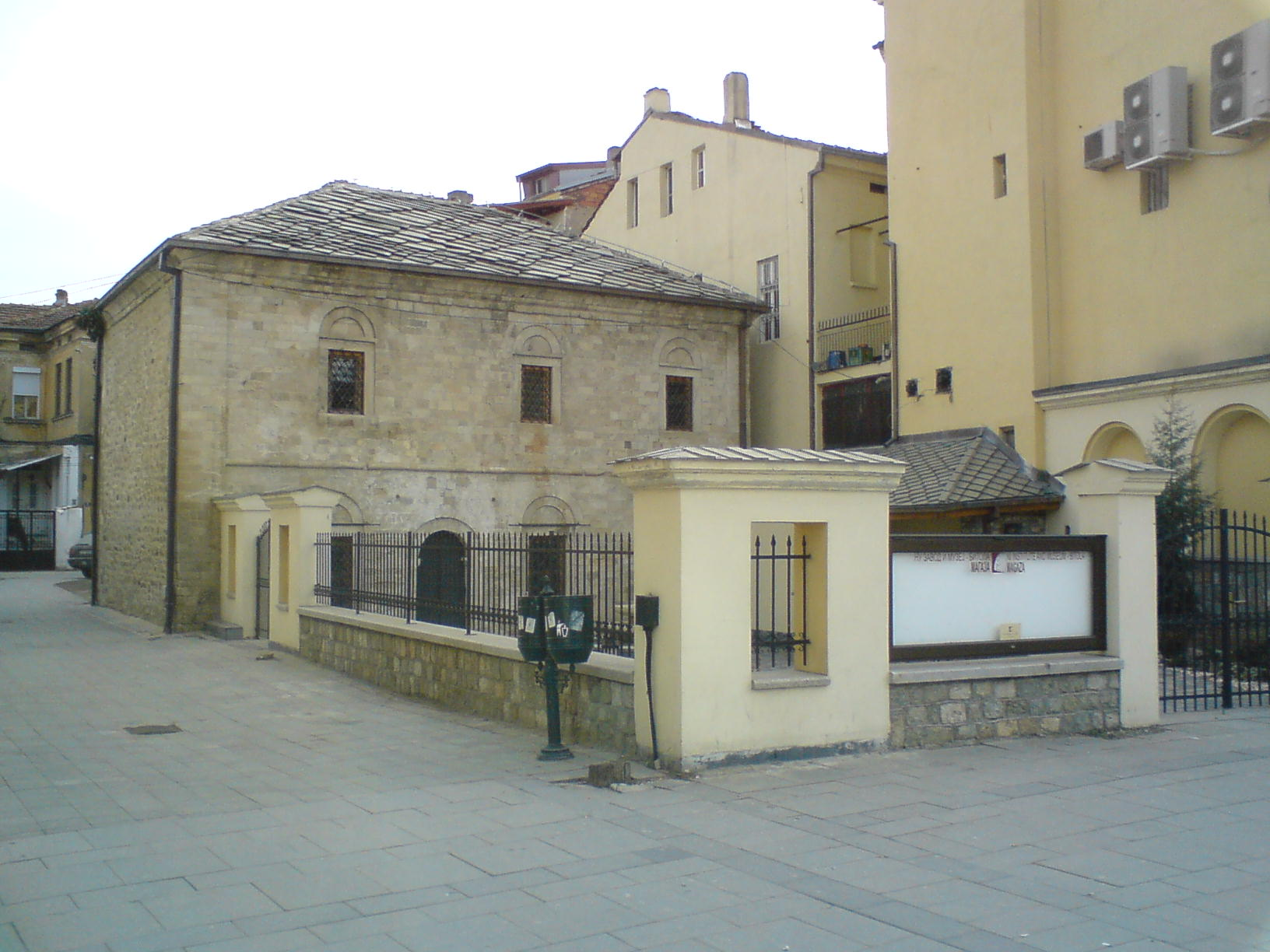
The Magaza, a gallery in the center of the city.

Si-Do

Every May, Bitola hosts the international children's song festival Si-Do.

== Education ==
St. Clement of Ohrid University of Bitola (Macedonian: Универзитет Св. Климент Охридски — Битола) was founded in 1979,

== Twin towns – sister cities ==
Bitola is twinned with:

- Épinal, France, since 1976
- Kranj, Slovenia, since 1976
- Požarevac, Serbia, since 1976
- Trelleborg, Sweden, since 1981
- Rockdale, Australia, since 1985
- Bursa, Turkey, since 1995
- Esztergom, Hungary, since 1998
- Pleven, Bulgaria, since 1999
- Pushkin, Russia, since 2005
- Kremenchuk, Ukraine, since 2006
- Stari Grad (Belgrade), Serbia, since 2006
- Veliko Tarnovo, Bulgaria, since 2006
- Nizhny Novgorod, Russia, since 2008
- Rijeka, Croatia, since 2011
- Ningbo, China, since 2014
- Cetinje, Montenegro, since 2020
- Herceg Novi, Montenegro, since 1976

== Gallery ==
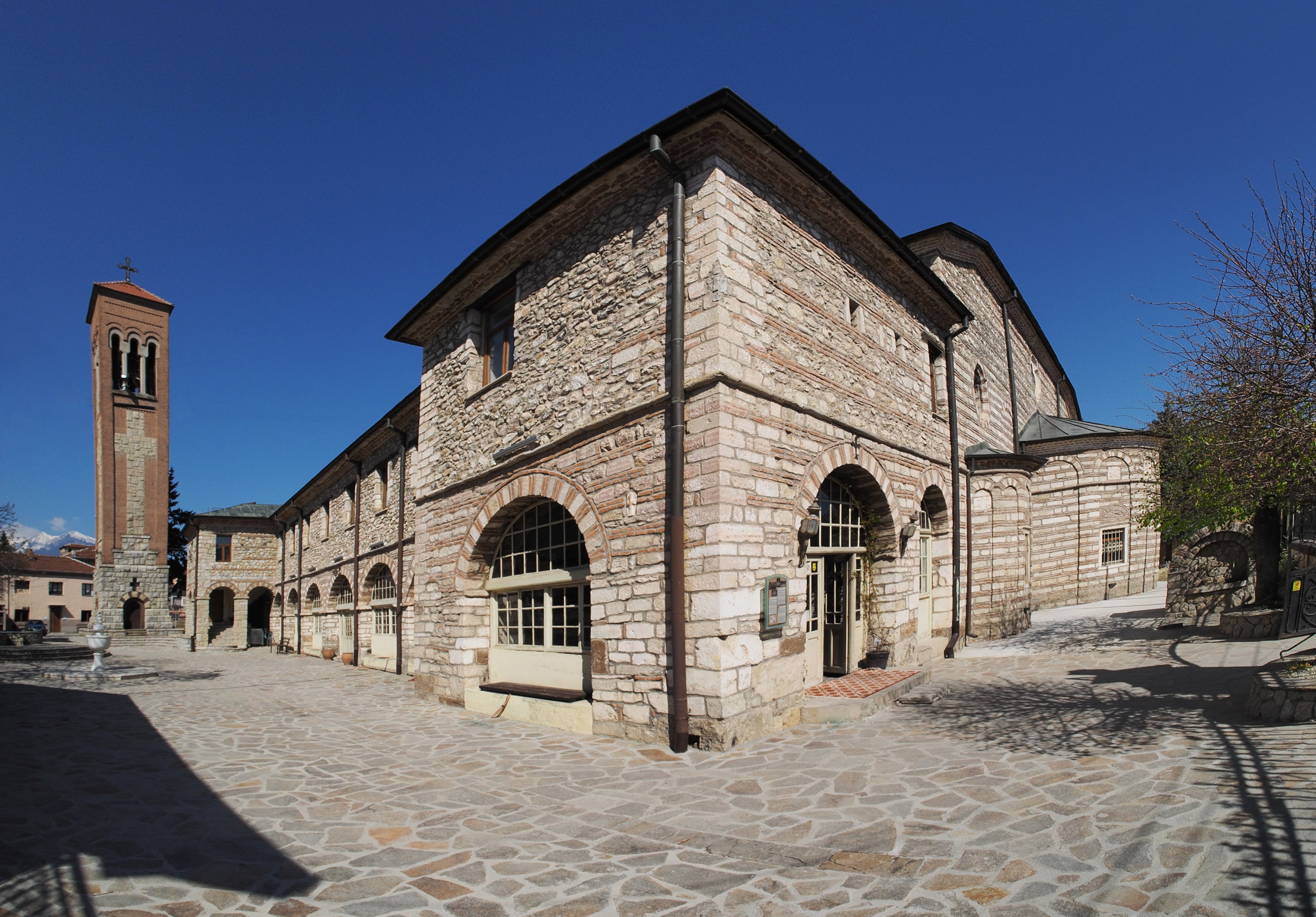
St. Demetrius Church, Cathedral church of Prespa-Pelagonium Eparchy

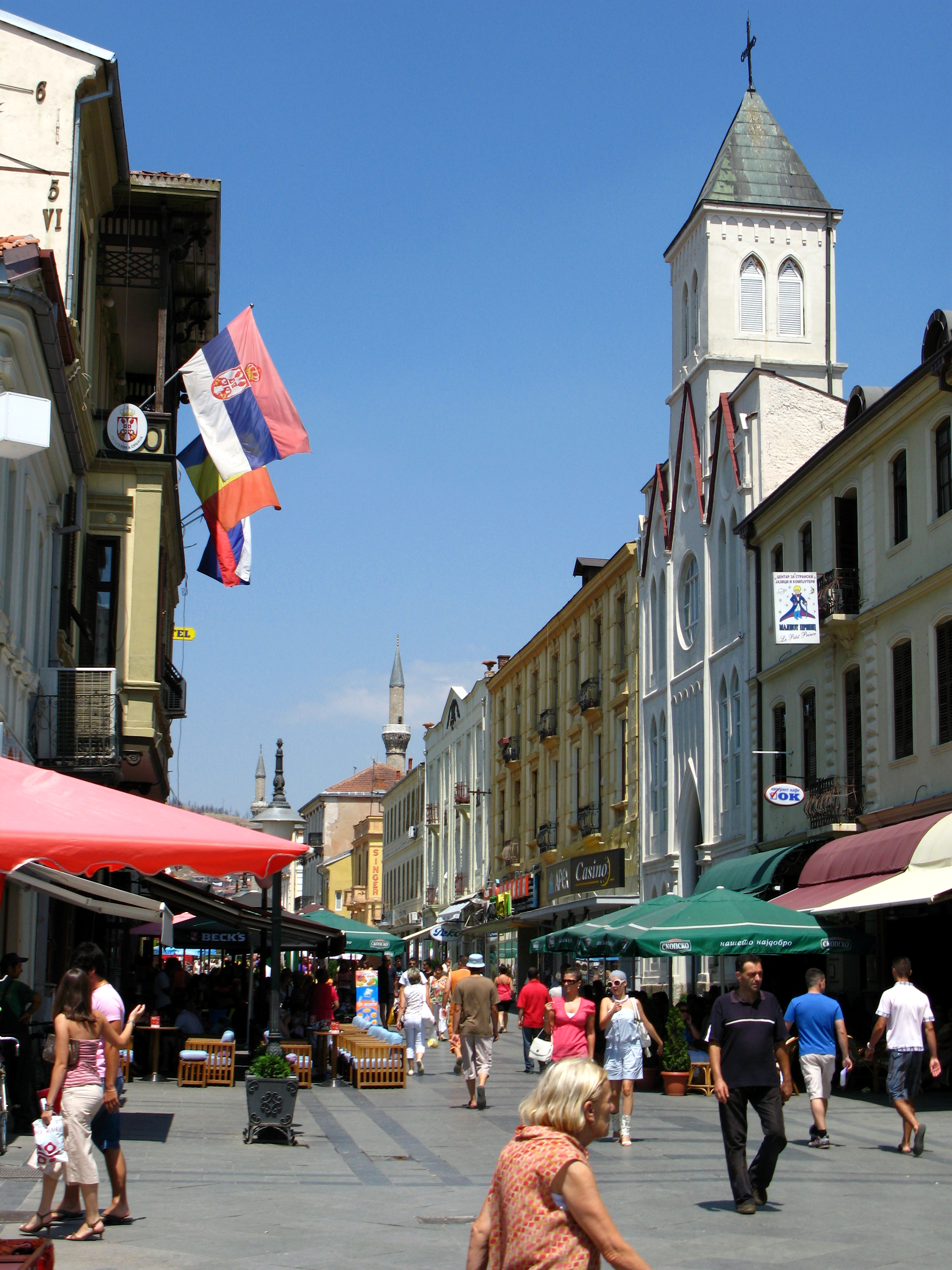
Shirok Sokak

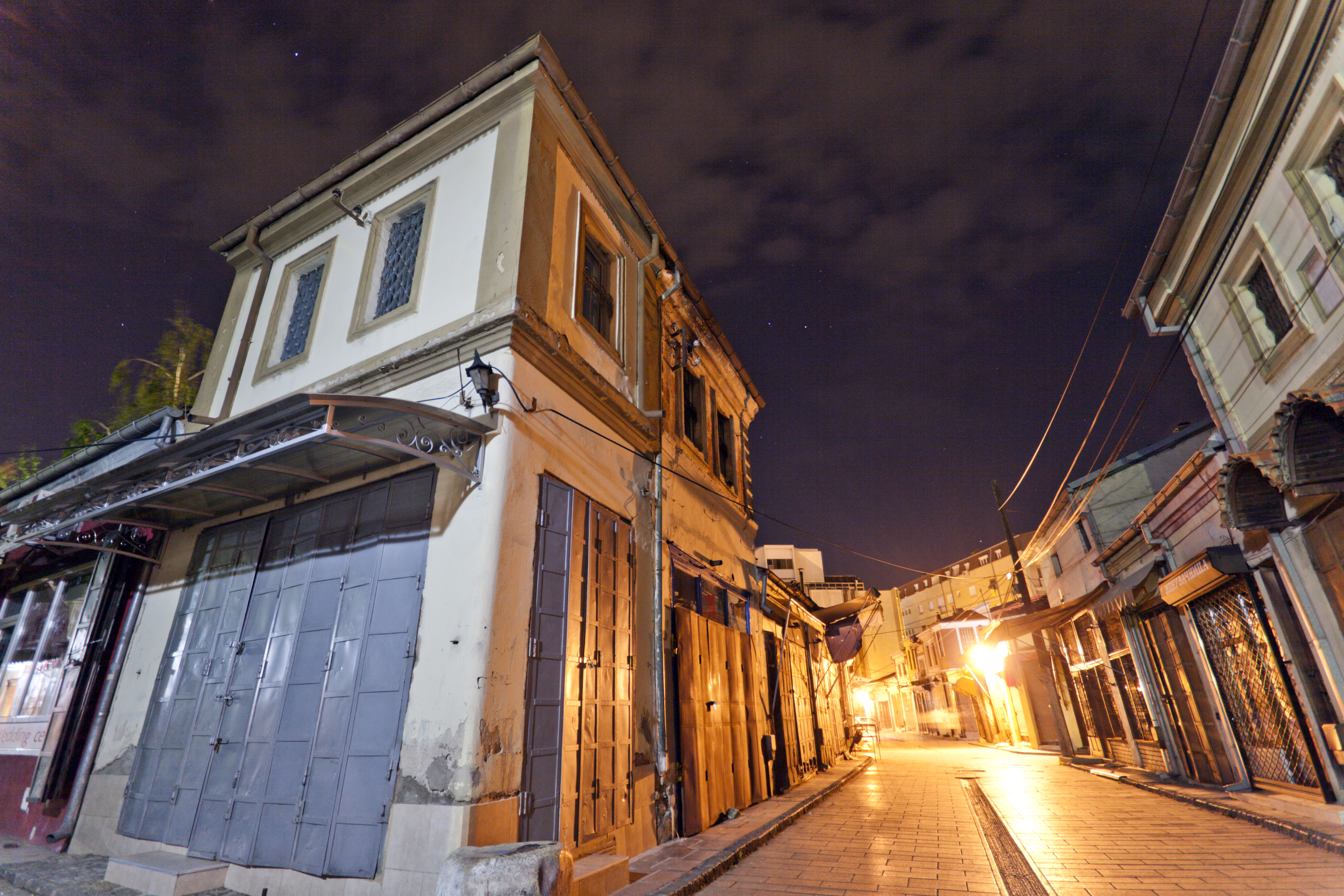
The old bazzar

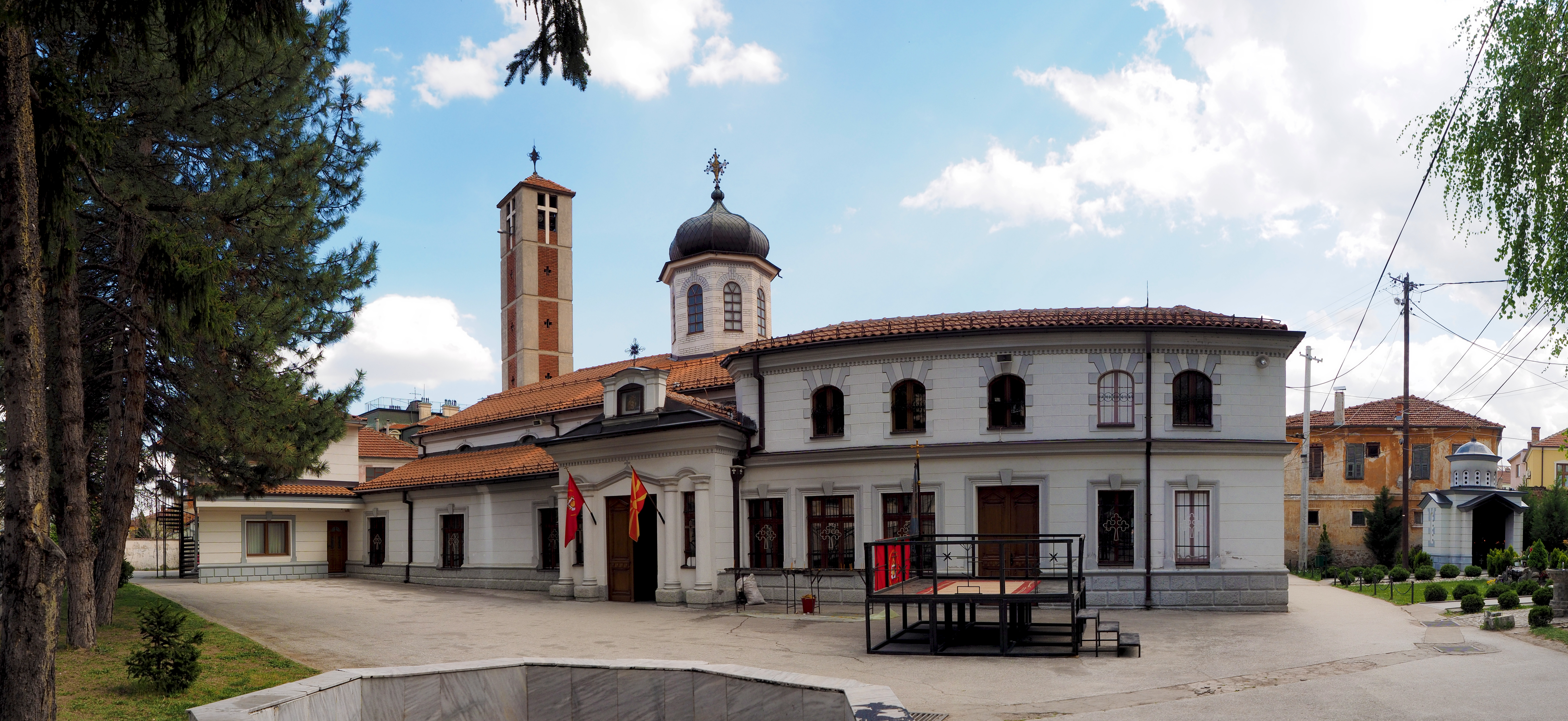
Orthodox St. Bogorodica church

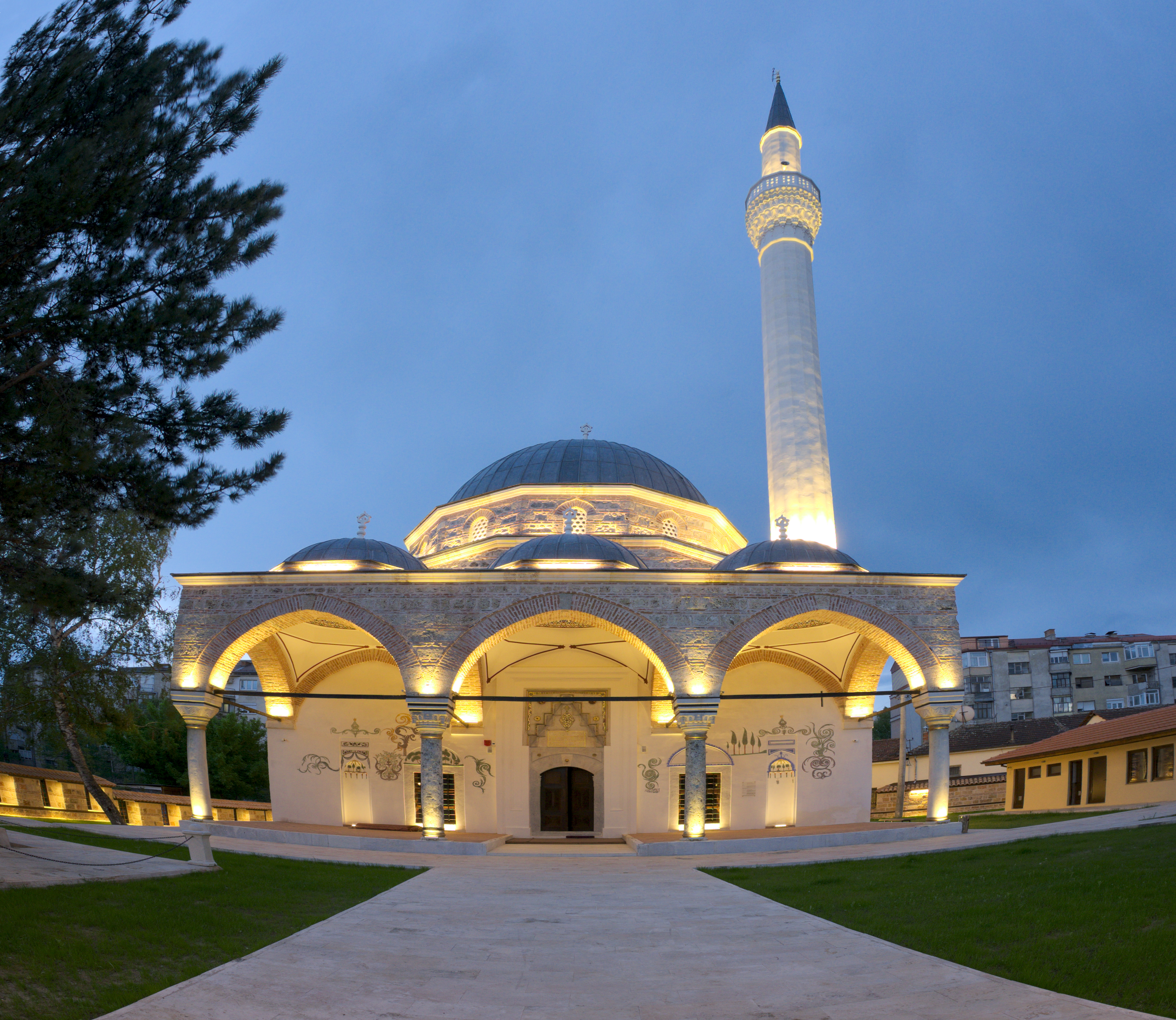
Hajdar Kadi mosque

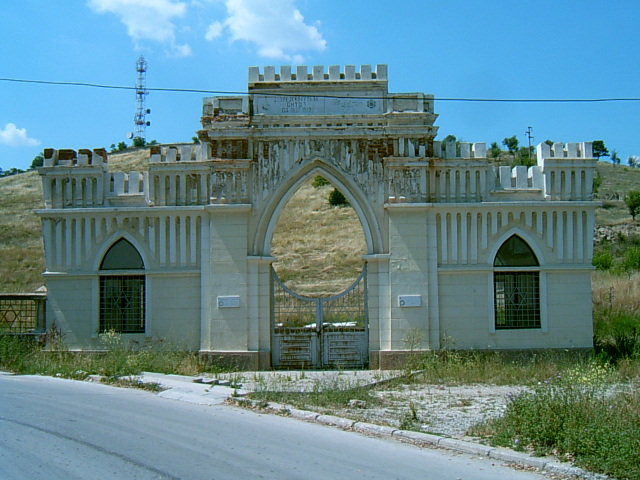
The Jewish cemetery

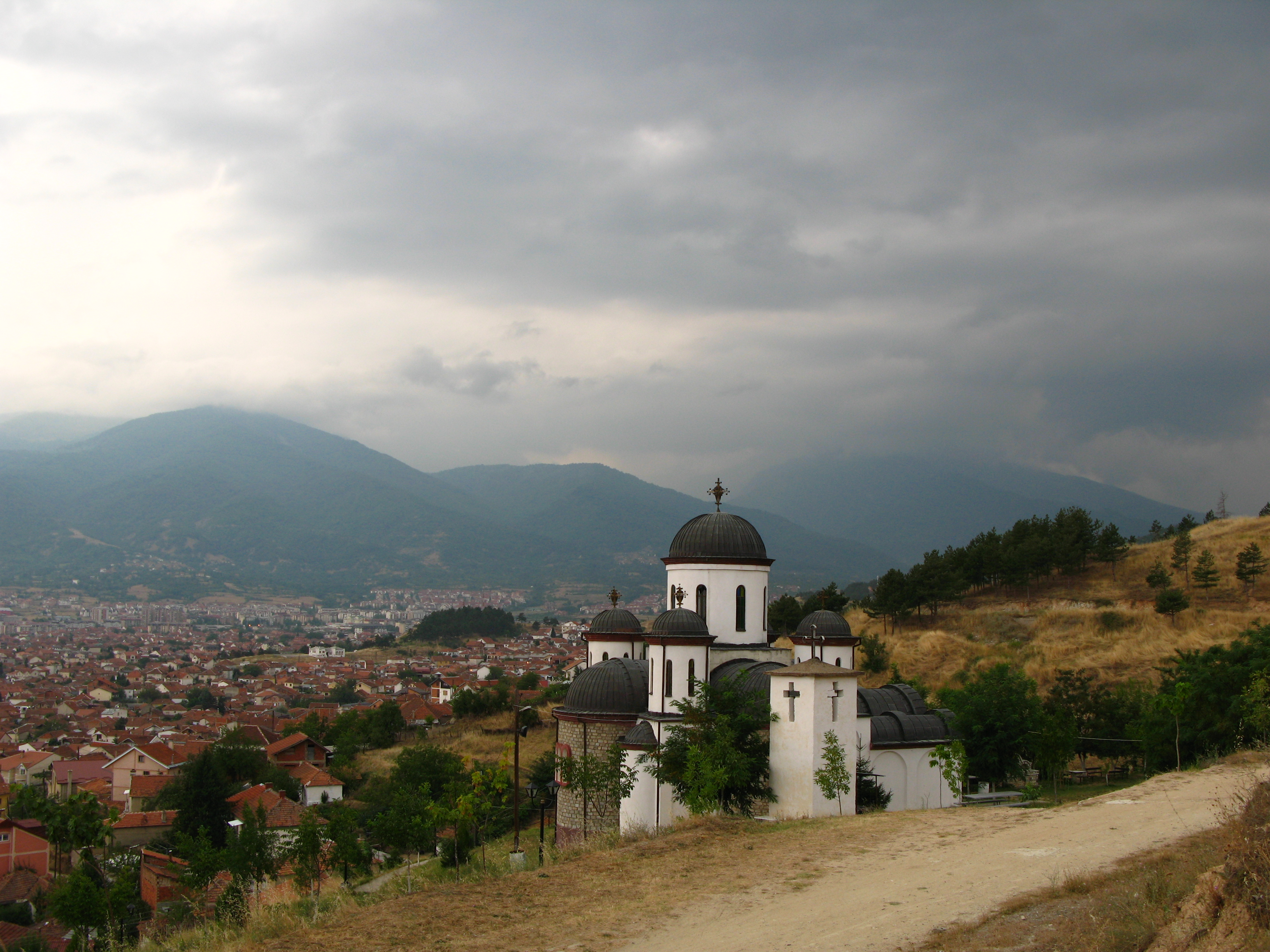
View from Krkardaš

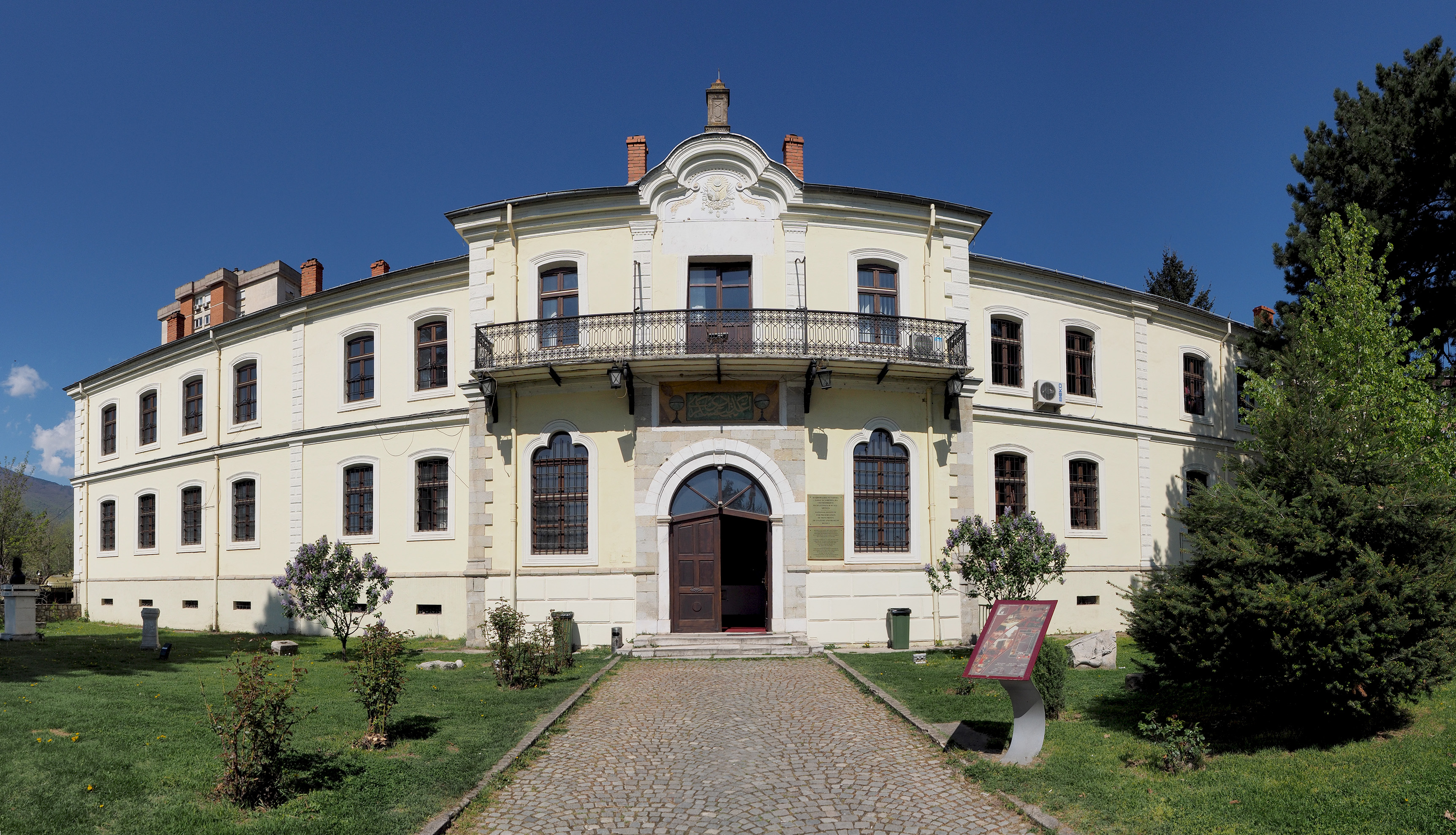
Bitola museum

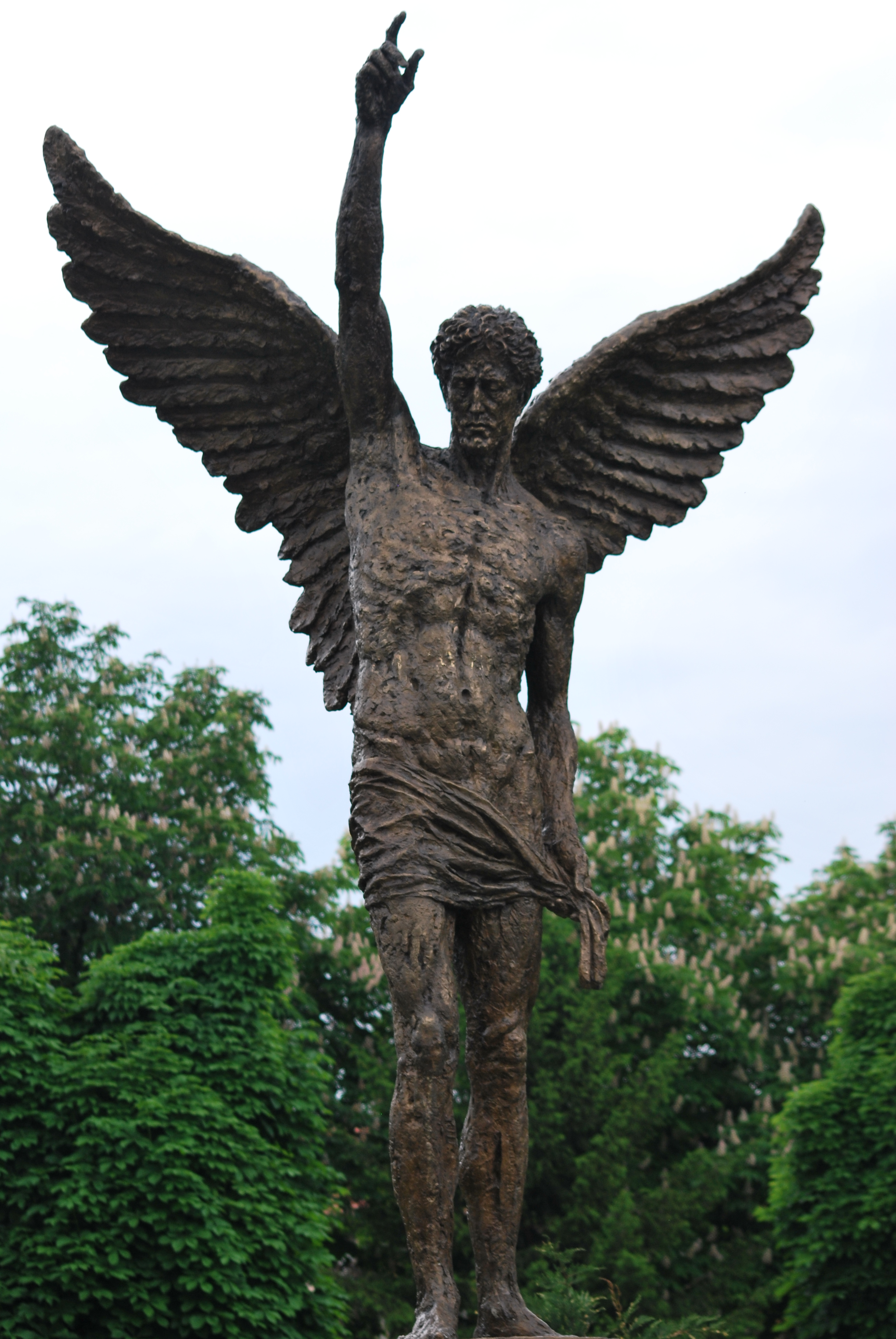
A monument of an angel for the defenders of Macedonia

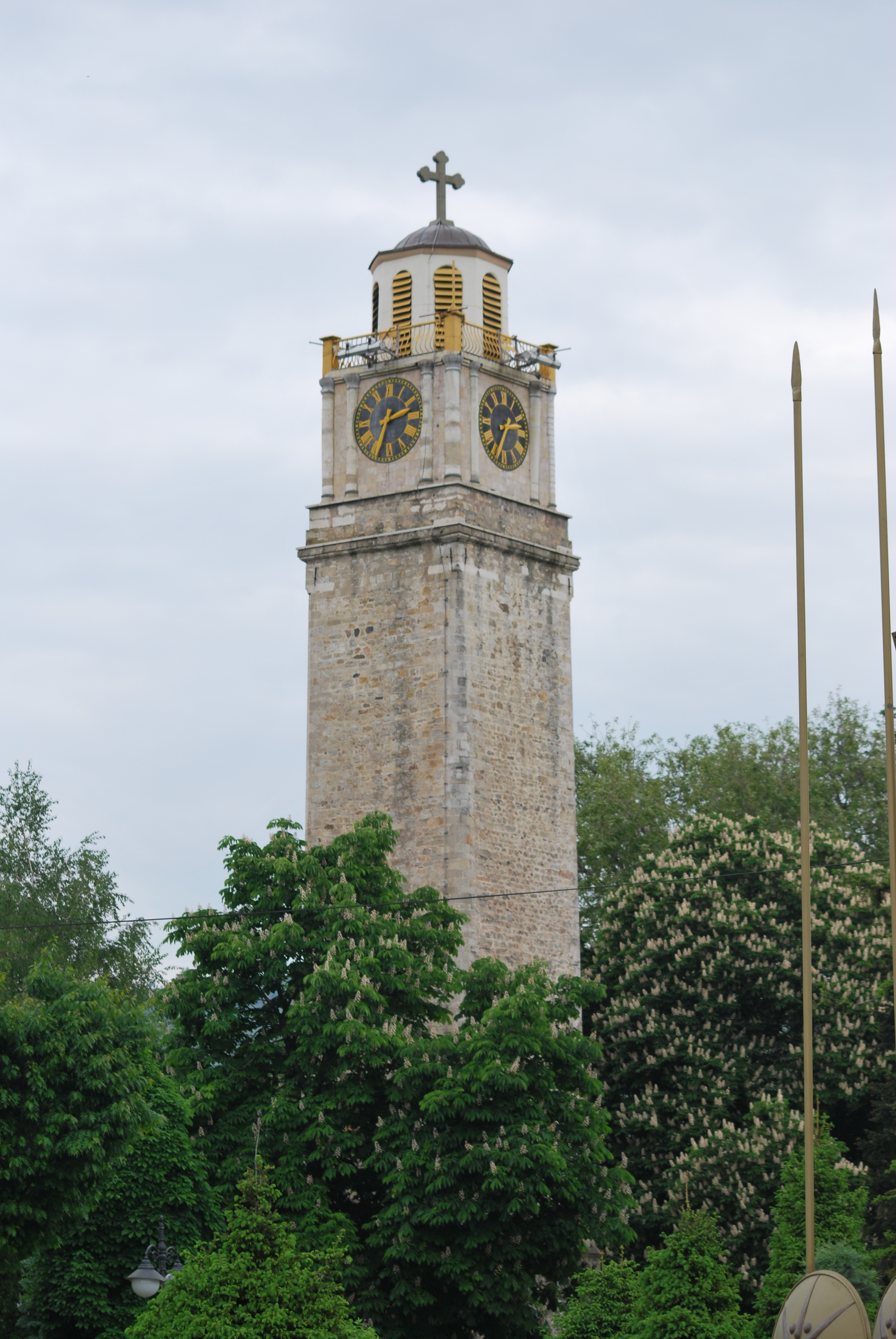
The tower clock

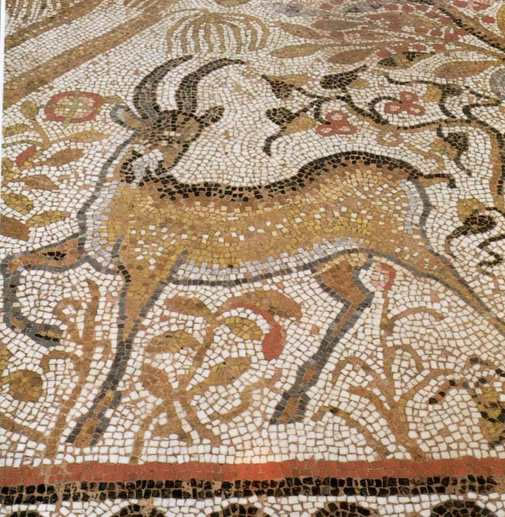
A mosaic from Heraclea Lyncestis

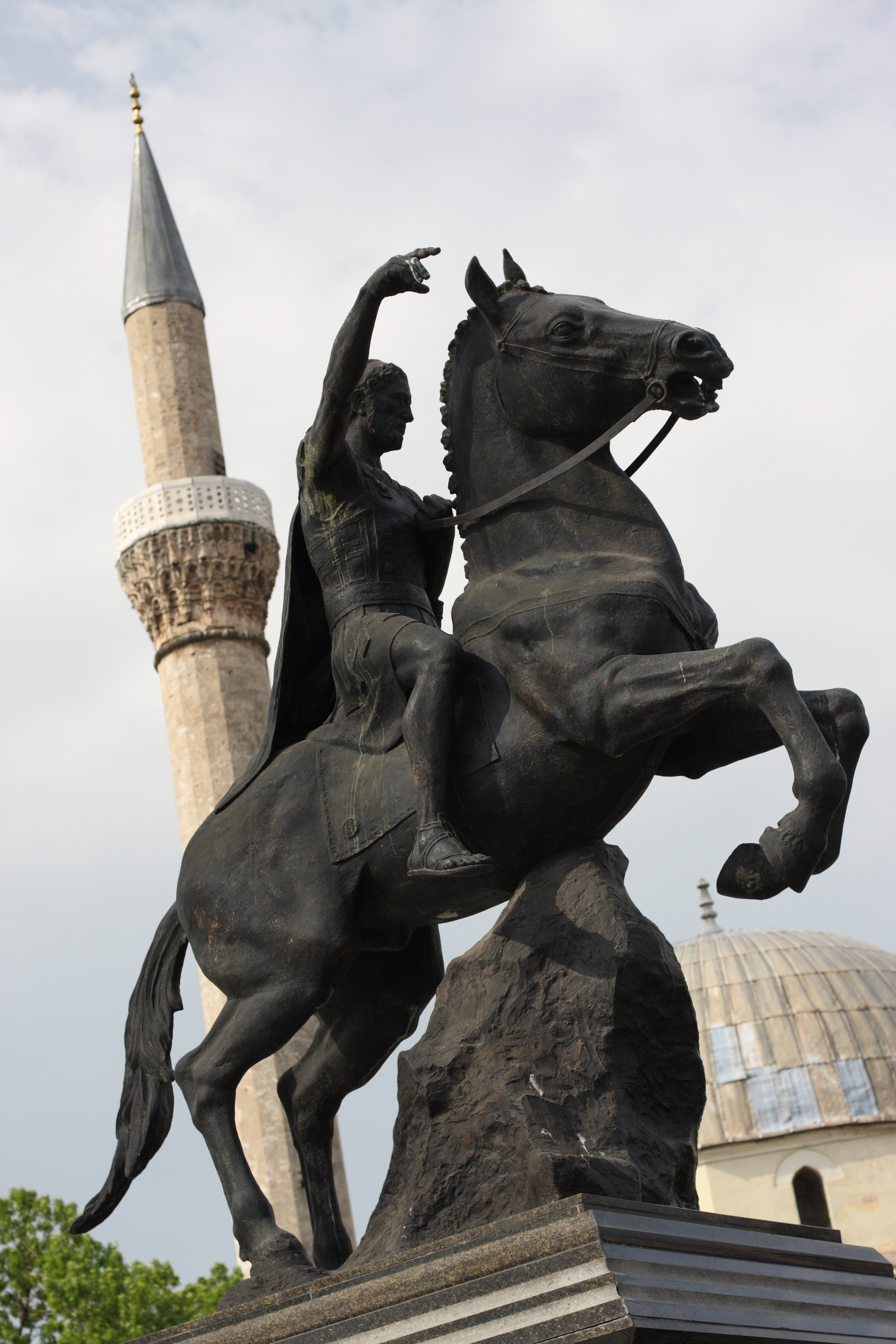
A monument of Philip II of Macedon

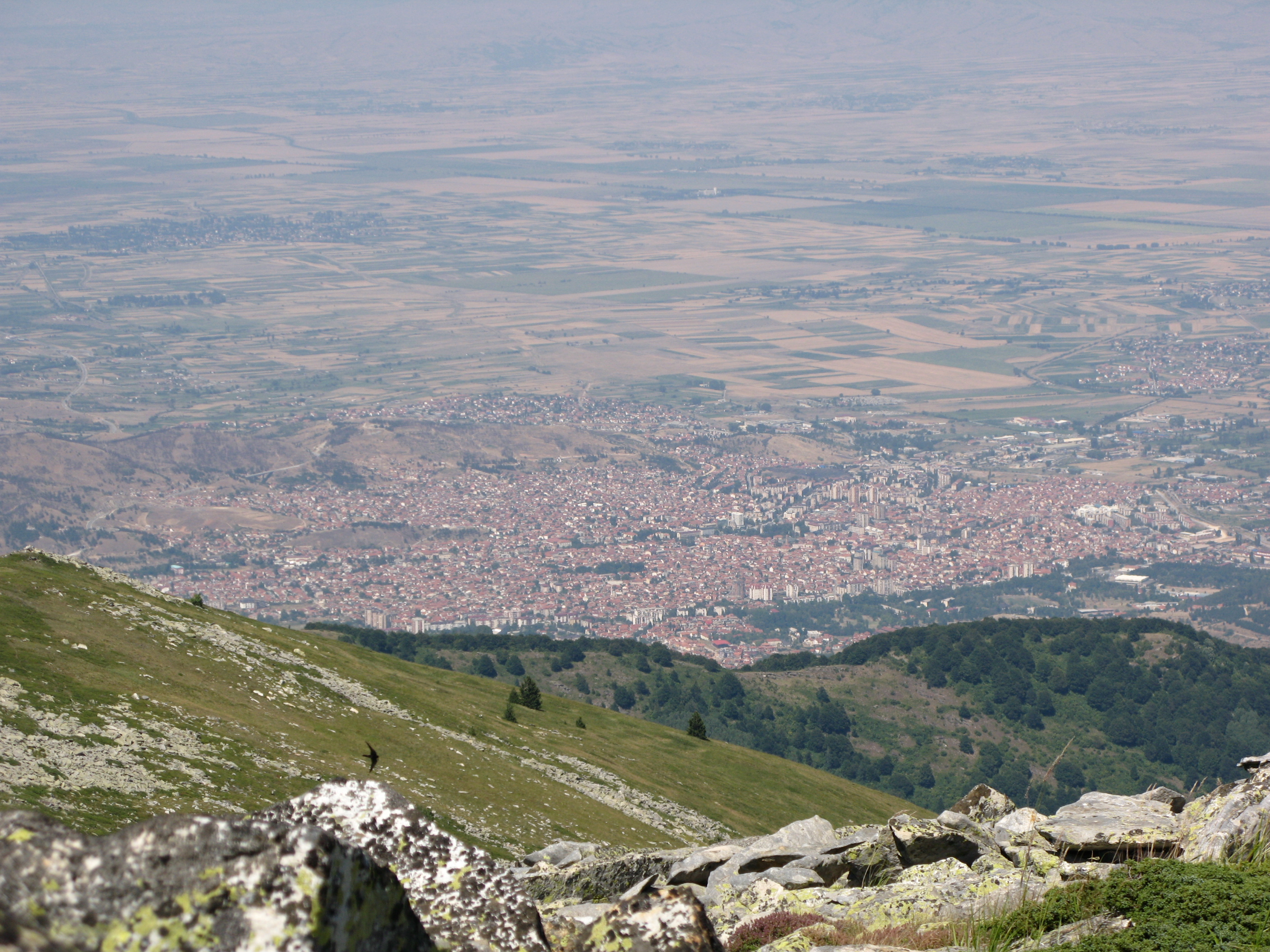
A view to Bitola from Baba mountain

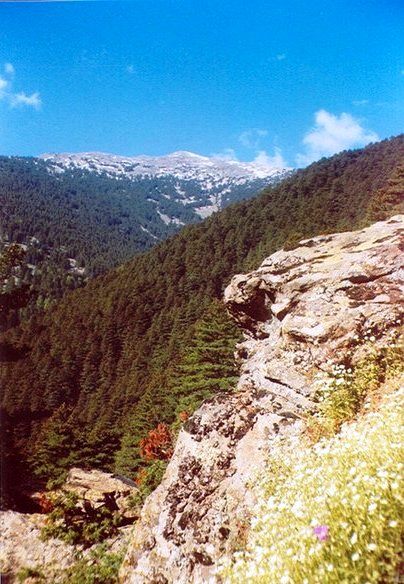
Pelister National Park

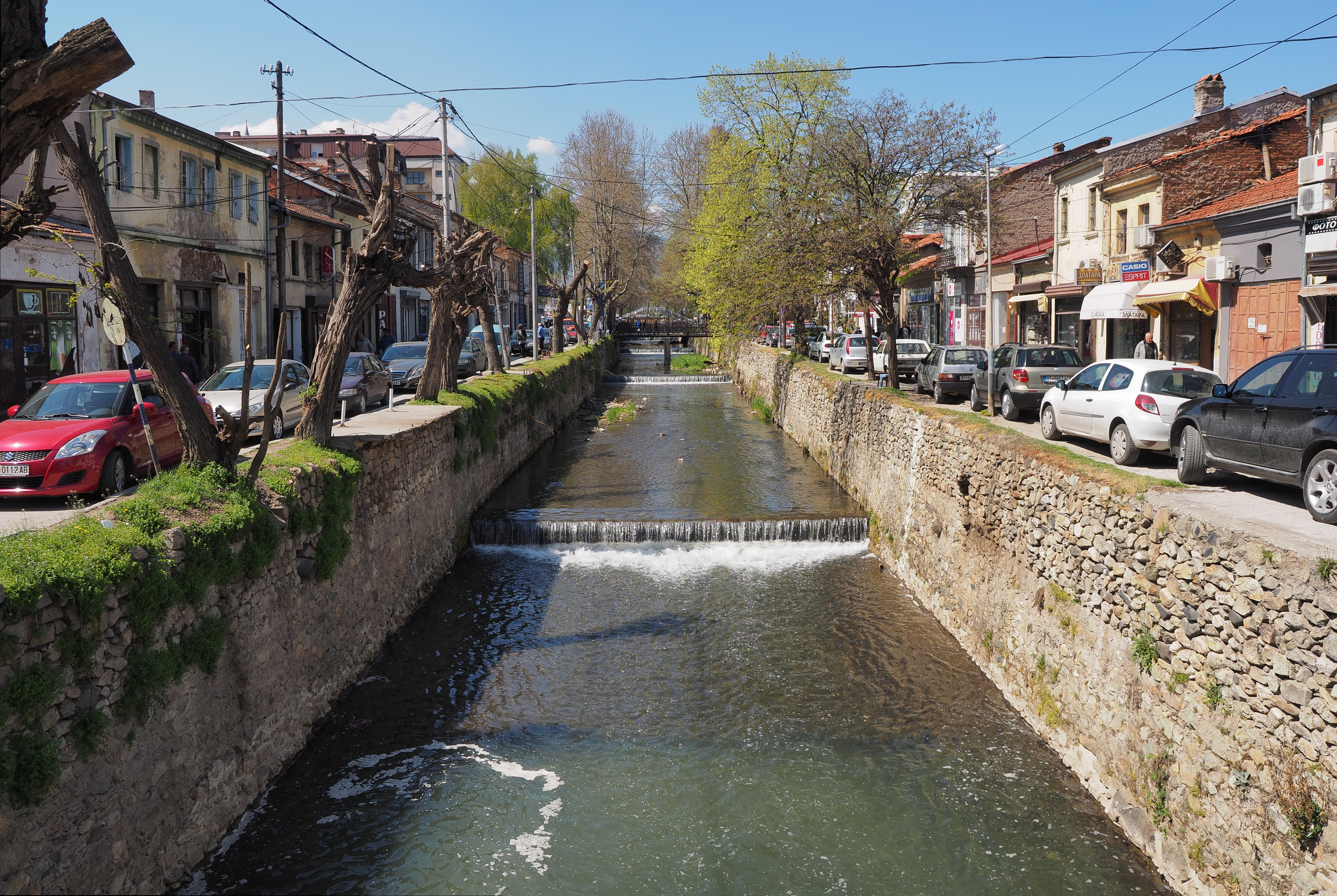
Dragor River

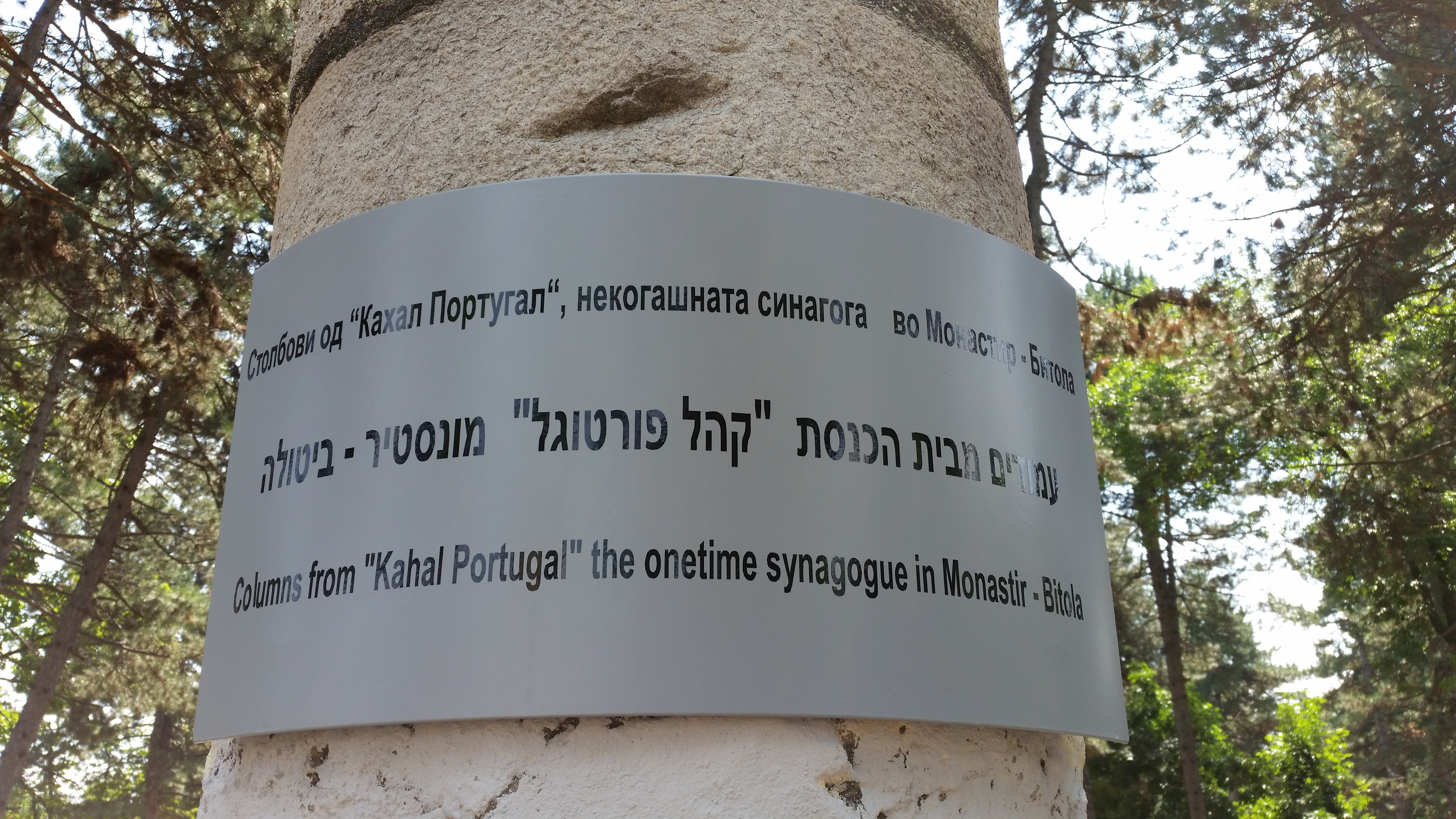
Columns from the "Kahal Portugal" Synagogue
