= Hafiz (name) =

Hafiz, Hafez, Hafizh, Hafidh, or Hafız (Arabic: حافظ, "one who remembers" lit. "keeper") is a masculine given name of Arabic origin. Notable people with the name include:

== Given name ==
=== Hafez ===
- Hafez (1325–1390), Persian poet
- Hafez al-Assad (1930–2000), Syrian politician
- Hafez Bashar al-Assad (born 2001), Syrian heir
- Hafez Musa Ali Basha, Albanian politician
- Hafez Ghanem, Egyptian-American economist
- Hafez Ghashghaei (born 1995), Iranian weightlifter
- Hafez El-Hussein (born 1959), Syrian athlete
- Hafez Ibrahim (1871–1932), Egyptian poet
- Hafez Kasseb, Egyptian footballer
- Hafez Makhlouf (born 1971), Syrian Army officer
- Hafez Al Mirazi, Egyptian journalist
- Hafez Nazeri (born 1979), Iranian singer and composer
- Hafez Afifi Pasha (1885/86–1961), Egyptian diplomat
- Hafez Abu Seada (1965–2020), Egyptian politician and human rights activist
- Hafez Tahouni, Iranian footballer

=== Hafidh ===
- Hafidh al-Droubi (1914–1991), Iraqi painter and draughtsman
- Hafidh Ameir Hassan (1946–2026), Tanzanian First Gentleman

=== Hafiz ===
- Hafiz (Malaysian singer) (born 1990), Malaysian singer
- Hafiz Farhat Abbas, Pakistani politician
- Hafiz Abdelrahman (died 2023), Sudanese flutist
- Hafiz-i Abru (died 1430), Persian historian
- Hafiz Abubakar (born 1954), Nigerian politician and academic
- Hafiz Adams (born 1992), Ghanaian footballer
- Hafiz Mustafa Agha (1770–1805), Ottoman Army officer and politician
- Hafiz Ahangarpoor (1952–??), Afghan political activist and revolutionary
- Hafiz Muhammad Ahmad (1862–1928), Indian Islamic scholar
- Hafiz Uddin Ahmad (born 1944), Bangladeshi Army officer and politician
- Hafiz Ahmed (born 1962), Indian teacher, poet, and social activist
- Hafiz Bashir Ahmed (born 1960), Indian politician
- Hafiz Hussain Ahmed (1951–2025), Pakistani Islamic scholar and politician
- Hafiz Mumtaz Ahmed (born 1970), Pakistani politician
- Hafiz Rasheed Ahmed, Pakistani politician
- Hafiz Uddin Ahmed (born 1946), Bangladesh politician
- Hafiz Alpuri, Afghan poet
- Hafiz Mahmud Asllani (1932–2021), Albanian Islamic scholar
- Hafiz Assamuddin, Pakistani politician
- Hafiz Babali (born 1971), Azerbaijani journalist and political prisoner
- Hafiz Bakhshaliyev (born 1980), Azerbaijani athlete
- Hafiz Rahmat Khan Barech (1723–1774), Indian monarch
- Hafiz Barkhurdar (1658–1707), Punjabi Sufi poet
- Hafiz Abdul Basit, Pakistani suspected criminal
- Hafiz Baxish (1932–1989), Azerbaijani poet
- Hafizu Bello (born 1974), Nigerian film director
- Hafiz Ahmad Choudhury, Bangladeshi politician
- Hafiz Faizal (born 1994), Indonesian badminton player
- Hafiz Gariba (born 2007), Ghanaian footballer
- Hafizul Hakim (born 1993), Malaysian footballer
- Hafiz Hakki (1879–1915), Ottoman general
- Hafiz Hamdullah (born 1968), Pakistani Islamic scholar and politician
- Hafiz Al-Hasan, Bangladeshi cricketer
- Hafizul Hassan, Indian politician
- Hafiz Mazhar Husain (1857–1912), Indian judge
- Hafiz Ibrahim (politician), Bangladeshi politician
- Hafiz Mohamad Ibrahim (1889–1968), Indian politician
- Hafiz Umar Ibrahim (born 2005), Nigerian footballer
- Hafiz Idriz Idrizi (1936–2005), Albanian Islamic scholar
- Hafiz Ahmad Jaunpuri (1834–1899), Indian Islamic scholar, religious preacher, and social worker
- Hafiz Kamal (born 1987), Malaysian footballer
- Hafiz Abdul Kareem (born 1960), Pakistani politician
- Hafiz Ibrahim Kawu (born 1984), Nigerian politician
- Hafiz Khan (1950–2022), Fijian businessman and politician
- Hafiz Ali Khan (1888–1972), Indian sarod player
- Hafizud Deen Khan (1950–2022), Fijian politician and businessman
- Hafiz Rahmat Khan (1708/9–1774), Indian ruler and warrior
- Hafiz Rashid Khan (born 1961), Bangladeshi poet, author, editor, and journalist
- Hafiz Saeed Khan (1972–2016), Afghan Islamic militant
- Hafiz Sabri Koçi (1921–2004), Albanian Islamic scholar
- Hafiz Konkoni (born 1999), Ghanaian footballer
- Hafiz Ali Korça (1873–1957), Albanian Islamic scholar
- Hafiz Mammadov (born 1964), Azerbaijani businessman
- Hafiz Liaqat Manzoor, Pakistani Guantanamo detainee
- Hafiz Ahmed Mazumder (born 1935), Bangladeshi politician
- Hafizal Mohamad (born 1993), Malaysian footballer
- Hafiz Ghulam Murtaza, Indian Sufi saint
- Hafiz Riaz Hussain Najafi (born 1941), Pakistani Islamic scholar
- Hafiz Nor (born 1988), Singaporean footballer
- Hafiz Mian Muhammad Numan, Pakistani politician
- Hafiz Osman (born 1984), Singaporean footballer
- Hafiz Pakzad (born 1955), Afghan painter
- Hafiz Hakki Pasha (1878–1915), Ottoman Army officer
- Hafiz Mehmed Pasha (died 1866) (died 1866), Ottoman Army officer
- Hafiz Mehmed Pasha (died 1903) (died 1903), Ottoman politician
- Hafiz Pashayev, Azerbaijani politician
- Hafiz Patel (1926–2016), Indian-British Islamic scholar
- Hafiz Rahim (1983–2020), Singaporean footballer
- Hafiz Abdur Rahim (died 2003), Afghan politician
- Hafiz Ramdan (born 1993), Malaysian footballer
- Hafiz Rashid, Indian footballer
- Hafiz Razi (died 1422), Iranian statesman and military commander
- Hafiz Razzakov (born 1975), Uzbek-Russian terrorist and serial killer
- Hafiz Hafeezur Rehman (born 1969), Pakistani politician
- Hafiz Naeem ur Rehman (born 1972), Pakistani social activist, engineer, and politician
- Hafiz Ringim, Nigerian police officer
- Hafiz Saeed (born 1950), Pakistani Islamist militant
- Hafiz Sahar (1928–1982), Afghan-American academic
- Hafiz Alam Sairani (1960–2024), Indian politician
- Hafiz Mehmood Khan Shirani (1880–1946), Indian researcher and poet
- Hafiz Siddiq (1940–2012), Indian politician
- Hafiz Siddiqi (1931–2018), Bangladeshi academic
- Hafiz Muhammad Siddique (1819–1890), Indian scholar
- Hafiz Suip (born 1990), Malaysian singer
- Hafiz Abu Sujad (born 1990), Singaporean footballer
- Hafiz Tanish (1549–??), Uzbek historian and poet
- Hafiz Ali Ulqinaku (1855–1913), Albanian Islamic scholar
- Hafiz Wahba (1889–1967), Saudi diplomat
- Hafiz Ammar Yasir, Pakistani politician
- Hafiz Salahuddin Yusuf (1945–2020), Indian-Pakistani Islamic scholar
- Hafiz Zhafri (born 2001), Malaysian squash player

=== Hafız ===
- Hafız Selman İzbeli, Turkish militiawoman
- Hafız Mehmet (1874–1926), Turkish politician
- Hafız Ahmed Pasha (1564–1632), Ottoman statesman
- Hafız Post (1630–1694), Ottoman composer
- Hafız Süleymanoğlu (born 1967), Turkish weightlifter

=== Hafizh ===
- Hafizh Syahrin (born 1994), Malaysian motorcycle racer

== Surname ==
=== Hafez ===
- Abdel Halim Hafez (1929–1977), Egyptian singer and actor
- Bahiga Hafez (1901–1983), Egyptian screenwriter, composer, director, editor, producer, and actress
- Farid Hafez (born 1981), Austrian political scientist
- Karim Hafez (born 1996), Egyptian footballer
- Mohamed Ali Hafez (died 2026), Egyptian scout
- Mohammed Hafez (academic) (born 1970), American sociologist
- Nada Hafez (born 1997), Egyptian saber fencer
- Nevine Hafez (born 1968), Egyptian swimmer
- Salah al-Deen Hafez (1938–2008), Egyptian writer and journalist
- Sherwite Hafez (born 1967), Egyptian swimmer
- Sulayman Hafez, Egyptian lawyer and politician
- Suleiman Hafez (born 1941), Jordanian economist and politician
- Yasser Abdel Hafez (born 1969), Egyptian novelist and journalist
- Yousry Hafez (born 1993), Egyptian amateur boxer

=== Hafiz ===
- Amin al-Hafiz (1921–2009), Syrian politician
- Amin al-Hafez (Lebanon) (1926–2009), Lebanese politician
- Helal Hafiz (1948–2024), Bangladeshi poet
- Hisham Hafiz (1931–2006), Saudi Arabian author and newspaper publisher
- Mirza Ghulam Hafiz (1920–2000), Bangladeshi politician
- Nezam Hafiz (1969–2001), Guyanese-American first class cricketer
