= Jusuf Efendi Mosque =

Mosque in Lipkovo, North Macedonia

Jusuf Efendi Mosque Yusuf Efendi Camii Јусуф Ефенди Џамија Xhamia Jusuf Efendi
- Location within North Macedonia Location within Balkans

Religion
- Affiliation: Sunni Islam
- Status: open

Location
- Location: Village Lipkovo, Lipkovo Municipality, North Macedonia
- Interactive map of Jusuf Efendi Mosque; Yusuf Efendi Camii; Јусуф Ефенди Џамија; Xhamia Jusuf Efendi
- Coordinates: 42°09′25″N 21°35′06″E

Architecture
- Type: mosque
- Style: Ottoman Architecture
- Completed: 1773; 253 years ago

Specifications
- Dome: 1
- Minaret: 1
- Materials: Stone

The Jusuf Efendi Mosque (Macedonian: Јусуф Ефенди Џамија; Albanian: Xhamia Jusuf Efendi; Turkish: Yusuf Efendi Camii) was built in 1773 at a time when North Macedonia was a part of the Ottoman Empire. It was damaged in the 1963 earthquake and reconstructed in 1967.

== See also ==
- Macedonian Muslims
- Muftiship of Kumanovo
- Islam in North Macedonia
- Islamic Religious Community of Macedonia
