= Čifluk =

Čifluk may refer to:

- Chiflik, the non-Turkish spelling of an Ottoman system of land management
- Čifluk, Visoko, a village in the municipality of Visoko, Federation of Bosnia and Herzegovina, Bosnia and Herzegovina
- Čifluk, Tešanj, a village in the municipality of Tešanj, Federation of Bosnia and Herzegovina, Bosnia and Herzegovina
- Čifluk, Travnik, a village in the municipality of Travnik, Federation of Bosnia and Herzegovina, Bosnia and Herzegovina
- Čifluk (Šipovo), a village in the municipality of Šipovo, Republika Srpska, Bosnia and Herzegovina
- Čifluk (Ilijaš), a village in the municipality of Ilijaš, Federation of Bosnia and Herzegovina, Bosnia and Herzegovina

== See also ==
- Čitluk (disambiguation)
- Čiflik (disambiguation)
