= Muftiship of Kumanovo =

Muftiship of Kumanovo (Albanian: Myftinia e Kumanovës, Macedonian: Муфтиство Куманово) is one of the 13 muftiships of Islamic Religious Community of Macedonia in Kumanovo, North Macedonia. Current Mufti is Abedin Imeri (Абедин Имери). New building of the Muftiship was opened on July 11, 2016. Bursa Mayor Recep Altepe was one of the guests of the ceremony. The construction started on March 20, 2013.

Map of Muftiships of North Macedonia

== List of Mosques in Kumanovo ==
Name Име Emri	Location Локација Lokacioni	Municipality Општина Komuna	Organisation Организација Organizacioni	Sect Секта Sekti	Year Година Viti	Worship Language Јазик на богослужба Gjuha e Adhurimit
Cherkezi Mosque	Cherkeze / Çerkez	Kumanovo / Kumanovë	IRC	Sunni	?	Albanian
Willage Mosque D'lga	D'lga / Gllëgë	Kumanovo / Kumanovë	IRC	Sunni	?	Albanian
Tatar Sinan Beg Mosque Kumanovo	Kumanovo / Kumanovë	Kumanovo / Kumanovë	IRC	Sunni	1751	Albanian
New Mosque	Kumanovo / Kumanovë	Kumanovo / Kumanovë	IRC	Sunni	?	Albanian
Hadzi Shefket Mosque Kumanovo	Kumanovo / Kumanovë	Kumanovo / Kumanovë	IRC	Sunni	?	Albanian
Osman Biligbash Mosque Lopate	Lopate / Liopatë	Kumanovo / Kumanovë	IRC	Sunni	?	Albanian
Romanovce Mosque	Romanovce / Rramanli	Kumanovo / Kumanovë	IRC	Sunni	?	Albanian
Sopot Mosque	Sopot / Sopot	Kumanovo	IRC	Sunni	?	Albanian
Kodza Mehmet Beg Mosque	Tabanovce / Tabanocë	Kumanovo / Kumanovë	IRC	Sunni	1586/96	Albanian
New Mosque Otlja	Otlja / Hotël	Lipkovo, Likovë, Липково	IRC	Sunni	?	Albanian
Mula Murat Mosque Otlja	Otlja / Hotël	Lipkovo / Likovë	IRC	Sunni	?	Albanian
Halit Efendi Mosque (Bedr)	Slupchane / Sllupçan	Lipkovo / Likovë	IRC	Sunni	?	Albanian
Mola Sadik Mosque Slupchane	Slupchane / Sllupçan	Lipkovo / Likovë	IRC	Sunni	?	Albanian
Aleshevce Mosque	Aleshevce / Allashecë	Lipkovo / Likovë	IRC	Sunni	?	Albanian
Belanovce Mosque	Belanovce / Bellanocë	Lipkovo / Likovë	IRC	Sunni	?	Albanian
Goshince Mosque	Goshince / Gushincë	Lipkovo / Likovë	IRC	Sunni	?	Albanian
Izvor Mosque	Izvor / Burim	Lipkovo / Likovë	IRC	Sunni	?	Albanian
Willage Mosque Kosturnik	Kosturnik / Kosturnik (Kojnare e Epërme)	Kumanovo / Kumanovë	IRC	Sunni	?	Albanian
New Mosque Lipkovo	Lipkovo / Likovë	Lipkovo / Likovë	IRC	Sunni	?	Albanian
Jusuf Efendi Mosque	Lipkovo / Likovë	Lipkovo / Likovë	IRC	Sunni	?	Albanian
Lojane Mosque	Lojane / Llojan	Lipkovo / Likovë	IRC	Sunni	?	Albanian
Lukare Mosque	Lukare / Llukarë	Lipkovo / Likovë	IRC	Sunni	?	Albanian
Matejche Mosque	Matejche / Mateç	Lipkovo / Likovë	IRC	Sunni	?	Albanian
White Mosque Nikushtak	Nikushtak / Nikushtak	Lipkovo / Likovë	IRC	Sunni	?	Albanian
Old Mosque Nikushtak	Nikushtak / Nikushtak	Lipkovo / Likovë	IRC	Sunni	?	Albanian
Willage Mosque Opae	Opae / Opajë	Lipkovo / Likovë	IRC	Sunni	?	Albanian
Orizare Mosque	Orizare / Orizare	Lipkovo / Likovë	IRC	Sunni	?	Albanian
Presnica Mosque	Presnica / Presnicë	Lipkovo / Likovë	IRC	Sunni	?	Albanian
Ropaljce Mosque	Ropaljce / Ropalcë	Lipkovo / Likovë	IRC	Sunni	?	Albanian
Runica Mosque	Runica / Runicë	Lipkovo / Likovë	IRC	Sunni	?	Albanian
Strazha Mosque	Strazha / Strazhë	Lipkovo / Likovë	IRC	Sunni	?	Albanian
Strima Mosque	Strima / Strimë	Lipkovo / Likovë	IRC	Sunni	?	Albanian
Vaksince Mosque	Vaksince / Vaksincë	Lipkovo / Likovë	IRC	Sunni	?	Albanian
Vishtica Mosque	Vishtica / Vishticë	Lipkovo / Likovë	IRC	Sunni	?	Albanian
Konjari Mosque	Konjari / Kojnare e Shkupit	Skopje / Shkup	IRC	Sunni	?	Albanian
Orkoci Mosque	Orkoci / Hërkocë	Lipkovo / Likovë	IRC	Sunni	?	Albanian

== See also ==
- Islam in North Macedonia
- Macedonian Muslims
