= New Mosque, Kumanovo =

Mosque in Kumanovo, North Macedonia

New Mosque Нова Џамија Xhamia e Re

Religion
- Affiliation: Sunni Islam
- Status: open

Location
- Location: Tode Mendol bb, Kumanovo, North Macedonia

Architecture
- Type: mosque
- Style: Ottoman Architecture

Specifications
- Dome: 1
- Minaret: 1
- Materials: Brick

New Mosque (Macedonian: Нова Џамија; Albanian: Xhamia e Re) is a Sunni Muslim Mosque in Kumanovo, North Macedonia.

== See also ==
- Muftiship of Kumanovo
- Macedonian Muslims
- Islam in North Macedonia
- Islamic Religious Community of Macedonia
