= Halit Efendi Mosque =

Mosque in Lipkovo, North Macedonia

Halit Efendi Mosque Halit Efendi Camii Халит Ефенди Џамија Xhamia Halid Efendi
- Location within North Macedonia

Religion
- Affiliation: Islam
- Branch/tradition: Sunni

Location
- Location: Slupčane Village
- Municipality: Lipkovo
- Country: North Macedonia
- Interactive map of Halit Efendi Mosque; Halit Efendi Camii; Халит Ефенди Џамија; Xhamia Halid Efendi
- Coordinates: 42°10′30″N 21°37′37″E

Architecture
- Type: mosque
- Style: Ottoman
- Completed: 1415; 611 years ago

Specifications
- Dome: 1
- Minaret: 1
- Materials: stone

The Halit Efendi Mosque (Macedonian: Халит Ефенди Џамија; Albanian: Xhamia Halid Efendi; Turkish: Halit Efendi Camii) is a mosque in Lipkovo Municipality, North Macedonia.

== History ==
The mosque was built in 1415 at a time when North Macedonia was a part of the Ottoman Empire. It was reconstructed in 1936, 1969, 1987 and the latest in 1994. In the 1994 renovation, the mosque and its minarets were completely rebuilt.

== See also ==
- List of the oldest mosques
- Macedonian Muslims
- Muftiship of Kumanovo
- Islam in North Macedonia
- Islamic Religious Community of Macedonia
