= Old Mosque, Kumanovo =

Mosque in Kumanovo, North Macedonia

Tatar Sinan Beg Mosque Татар Синан Бег Џамија Xhamia Sinan Tatar Pasha Alaca Camii or Eski Mosque
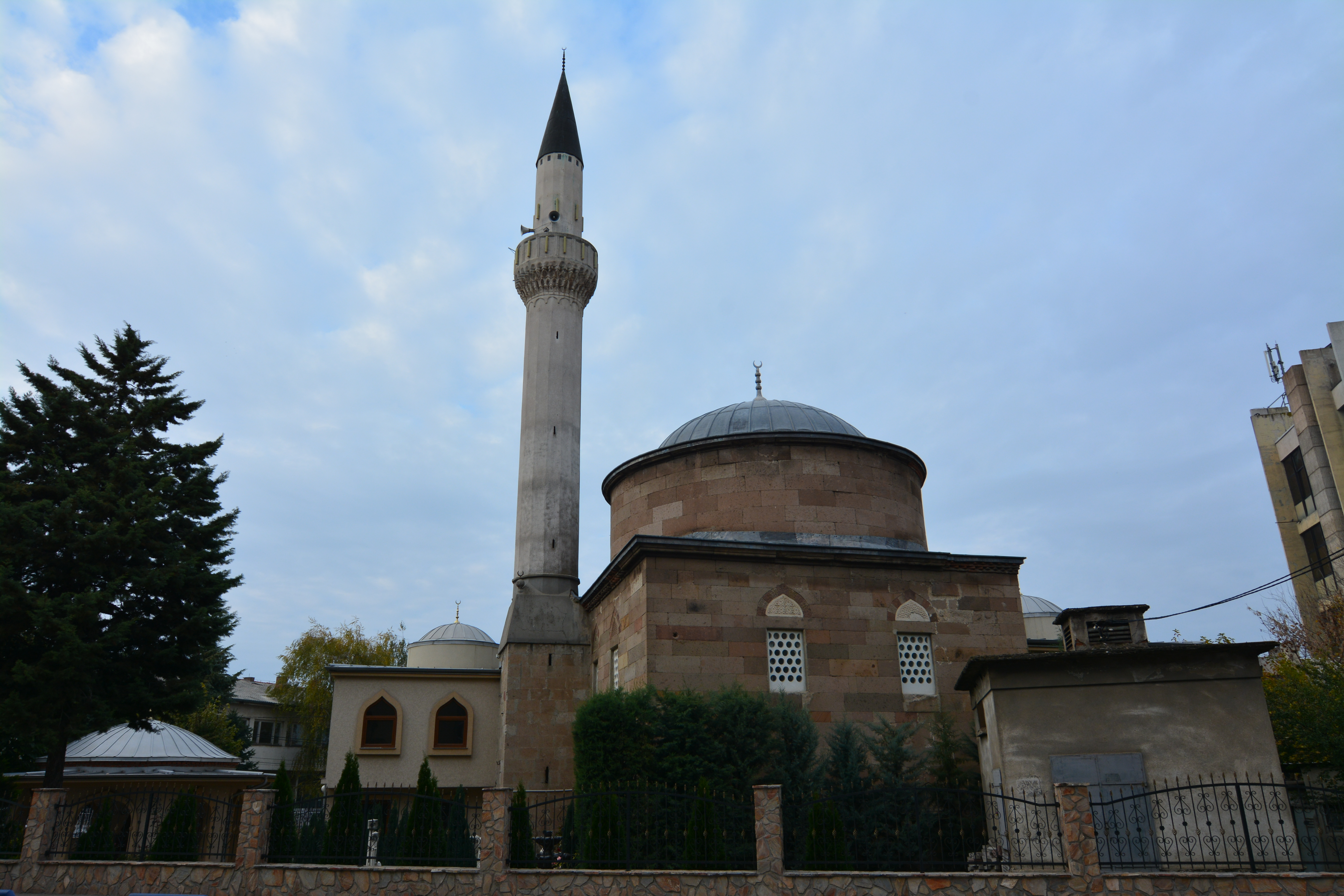

- Location within North Macedonia

Religion
- Affiliation: Islam
- Branch/tradition: Sunni

Location
- Municipality: Kumanovo
- Country: North Macedonia
- Interactive map of Tatar Sinan Beg Mosque; Татар Синан Бег Џамија; Xhamia Sinan Tatar Pasha; Alaca Camii or Eski Mosque
- Coordinates: 42.13743°N 21.71479°E

Architecture
- Type: mosque
- Completed: 1532; 494 years ago

Specifications
- Dome: 1
- Minaret: 1
- Materials: stone

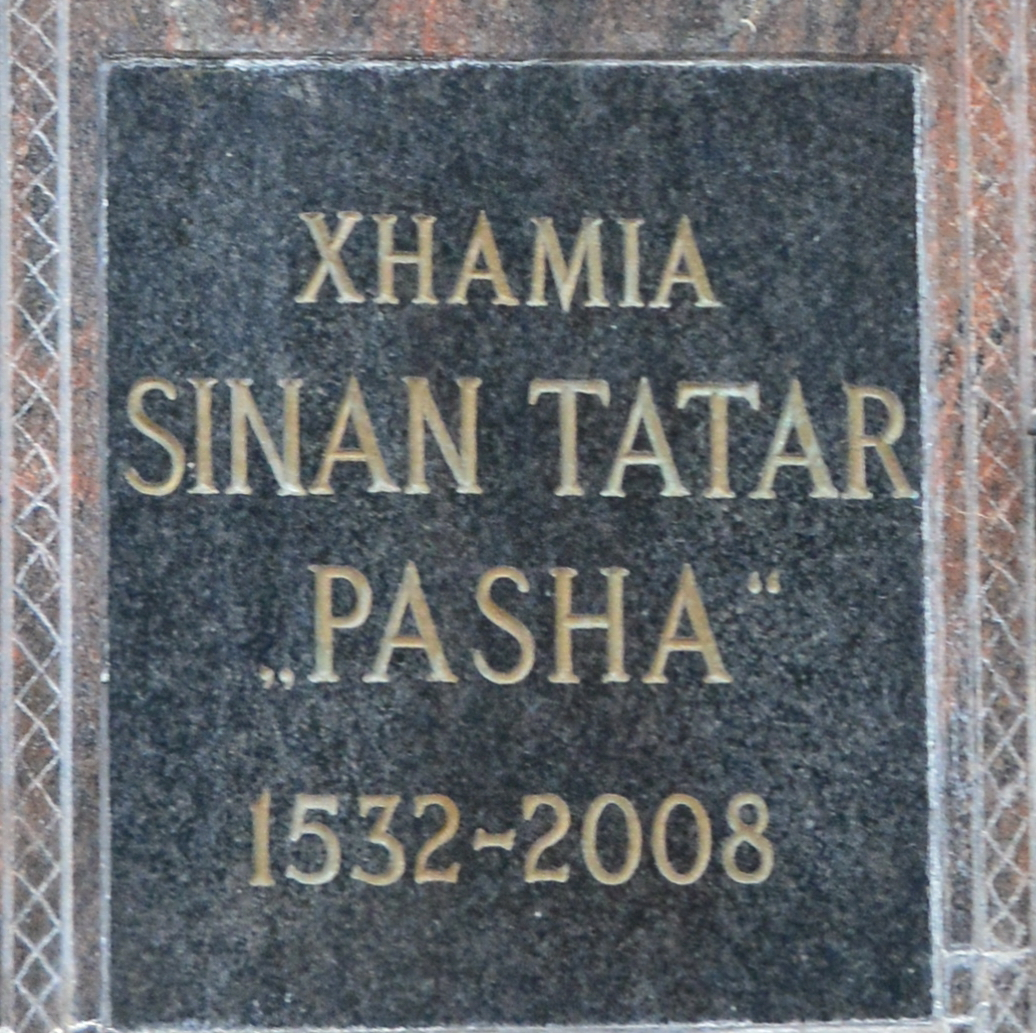
Eski mosque sign after the resent reconstruction

The Eski Mosque (Macedonian: Татар Синан Бег Џамија, romanized: Tatar Sinan Beg Džamija; Albanian: Xhamia Sinan Tatar Pasha; Turkish: Eski Camii; "Old mosque") is a mosque in Kumanovo, North Macedonia

== History ==
The mosque was built in 1532 at a time when North Macedonia was a part of the Ottoman Empire. It was then later reconstructed in 1751 and 2008. During World War II in 1943, the minaret was demolished and rebuilt again in the same year.

== Architecture ==
The mosque features a large square and seven small squares. The mosque's minaret stands at a height of 23 meters. The building was constructed with yellowish stone blocks. The mosque also features a small graveyard with tombstone dates back to 1659.

== See also ==
- Macedonian Muslims
- Muftiship of Kumanovo
- Islam in North Macedonia
- Islamic Religious Community of Macedonia
