= Hafiz Idriz Idrizi =

Albanian Islamic scholar

- Title: Hafiz; Imam; Hoxhë

Personal life
- Born: November 15, 1936; Skopje, Kingdom of Yugoslavia
- Died: November 17, 2005 (aged 69); Skopje, Macedonia
- Home town: Skopje
- Parent(s): Hafiz Ibrahim Efendi, Fikrije Hanim
- Citizenship: Macedonian
- Main interest(s): Quranic Studies, Aqidah, Kalam (Islamic theology), Fiqh (Islamic jurisprudence), Hadith studies, Shari'a (Islamic law), Ottoman literature
- Occupation: Imam, Alim, Islamic Teacher

Religious life
- Religion: Islam
- Denomination: Sunni
- Jurisprudence: Hanafi
- Creed: Maturidi

Muslim leader
- Influenced by: Hafiz Ibrahim Efendi Mehmet Efendi
- Influenced: Adnan Ismaili

Hafiz Idriz Idrizi (November 15, 1936 – November 17, 2005) was an Albanian Islamic scholar, Quranic teacher, and religious leader from Skopje, Macedonia.

== Biography ==
Idriz was born in Skopje, at the time part of the Kingdom of Yugoslavia, to Hafiz Ibrahim Efendi and Fikrije Hanım. Raised in an Albanian Muslim family, he memorized the Quran at a young age, earning the title of "Hafiz".

He was one of the last scholars in the Balkans trained in the Ottoman Islamic tradition. He studied Quran, Islamic law, theology, and Prophetic traditions, first under his father then with Mehmet Efendi. He became proficient in Arabic and Ottoman Turkish, which were essential for understanding these subjects.

== Career ==
Idrizi dedicated over 50 years to religious service. He served as an imam, educator, and religious leader, primarily at Mustafa Pasha Mosque and Dukancik Mosque in Skopje. His sermons and teachings influenced many muslims in the region.

He studied and taught hadith extensively, focusing on works like Imam Nawawi’s Riyad al-Salihin and Ibn Hajar al-Asqalani’s Fath al-Bari. He also explained Ibn Hajar’s Nukhbat al-Fikr to his students, covering hadith terminology and interpretation. For the Prophet’s biography, he relied on Ibn Hisham’s Sirah. His teaching sessions, held twice a week, lasted about three hours, during which students memorized and discussed hadiths. He is considered one of the last in the region to teach hadith using classical methods.

== Death and legacy ==
Hafiz Idrizi died on November 17, 2005, in Skopje.

He played an important role in preserving traditional Islamic scholarship and connecting it with the needs of the modern Muslim community in the Balkans.

== See also ==
- Islam in North Macedonia
- Muslim Community of North Macedonia
- Albanian Sunni Muslims
