= Hafiz Mahmud Asllani =

Albanian Imam

- Title: Hafiz

Personal life
- Born: March 15, 1932 Čiflik, Želino, Kingdom of Yugoslavia
- Died: June 21, 2021 (aged 89) Tetovo, North Macedonia
- Home town: Tetovo
- Main interest(s): Tajweed, Arabic grammar, Quranic studies
- Occupation: Imam, Alim, Quran Teacher

Religious life
- Religion: Islam
- Denomination: Sunni
- Jurisprudence: Hanafi
- Creed: Maturidi

Muslim leader
- Influenced by: Mulla Tahiri, Mulla Beqiri
- Influenced: Abdurrahman ef. Asllani

Mulla Mahmud Asllani (March 15, 1932 – June 21, 2021) was an Albanian, hafiz, alim, and Quran teacher from Tetovo, North Macedonia. He was widely known for his role in teaching Quran to children and training nearly 200 hafiz.

== Early life ==
Hafiz Mahmud Asllani was born in 1932 in the village of Čiflik near Tetovo, at the time part of the Kingdom of Yugoslavia. Raised in a challenging environment, he faced financial hardship after losing his father. Despite these difficulties, he pursued Islamic studies, walking long distances to learn. He studied under Mulla Beqiri and Mulla Tahiri, learning tajweed, Arabic grammar, and syntax, later becoming a hafiz. Asllani faced significant repression during the Communist regime.

== Religious activity ==
Mulla Mahmud Asllani taught daily from before the Fajr prayer until after Maghrib, taking only two days off during the Eid celebrations, a routine he maintained for nearly 50 years, starting in 1967. In 2012, he was recognized by the World Organization for Memorizing the Quran as the "best teacher in the world." Over his career, Asllani taught over 1000 students and produced nearly 200 hafiz, with the shortest memorization time being nine months. His work at the Šarena Mosque in Tetovo became a symbol of success, attracting many visitors, including Turkish officials who helped improve his working conditions in 2011.

== Death and legacy ==
Mulla Mahmud died in 2021. His funeral was attended by imams and leaders of the Islamic religious community in North Macedonia. His teachings influenced his son, Abdurrahman ef. Asllani, who continues his work by teaching Quran to children. Asllani's contributions to Quranic education, particularly at the Larme Mosque in Tetovo, left a lasting impact on the local community.

== See also ==
- Islamic Religious community of North Macedonia
- Islam in North Macedonia
- Albanian Sunni Muslims
