= Chiflik (disambiguation) =

Chiflik may refer to:

- Chiflik, Turkish term for a system of land management in the Ottoman Empire

== Places in Bulgaria ==
- Chiflik, Kardzhali Province
- Chiflik, Lovech Province
- Chiflik, Vidin Province
- Dolni Chiflik
- Zaim Chiflik

== See also ==
- Čiflik (disambiguation)
