= Vištica =

Vištica Виштица Vishticë
- Village
- Location within North Macedonia
- Coordinates: 42°06′N 21°36′E
- Country: North Macedonia
- Region: Southeastern
- Municipality: Lipkovo

Population (2021)
  - Total: 810
- Time zone: UTC+1 (CET)
  - Summer (DST): UTC+2 (CEST)
- Car plates: KU
- Website: .

Vištica (Macedonian: Виштица, Albanian: Vishticë) is a village in the municipality of Lipkovo, North Macedonia.

== Demographics ==
As of the 2021 census, Vištica had 810 residents with the following ethnic composition:

- Albanians 784
- Persons for whom data are taken from administrative sources 26

According to the 2002 census, the village had a total of 991 inhabitants. Ethnic groups in the village include:

- Albanians 984
- Others 7
