= Zlokuḱane =

Zlokuḱane Злокуќане Zllakuçan
- Village
- Location within North Macedonia
- Coordinates: 42°14′51″N 21°32′20″E
- Country: North Macedonia
- Region: Southeastern
- Municipality: Lipkovo

Population (2021)
  - Total: 3
- Time zone: UTC+1 (CET)
  - Summer (DST): UTC+2 (CEST)
- Car plates: KU
- Website: .

Zlokuḱane (Macedonian: Злокуќане, Albanian: Zllakuçan) is a village in the municipality of Lipkovo, North Macedonia.

== Demographics ==
As of the 2021 census, Zlokuḱane had 3 residents with the following ethnic composition:

- Persons for whom data are taken from administrative sources 3

According to the 2002 census, the village had a total of 12 inhabitants. Ethnic groups in the village include:

- Albanians 12
