= New Mosque, Bitola =

Former mosque in Bitola, North Macedonia

Yeni Mosque
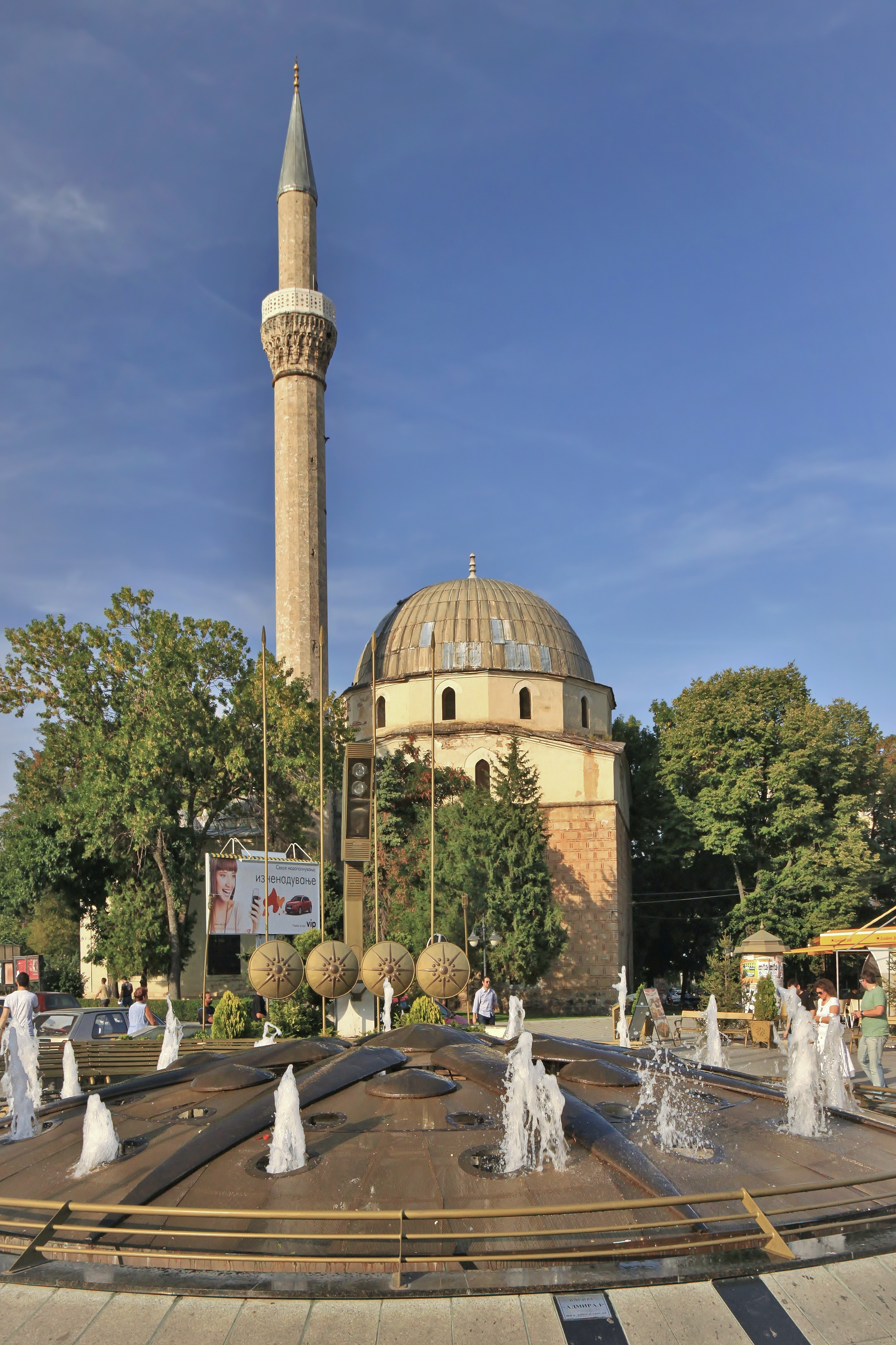

- Location within North Macedonia

Religion
- Affiliation: Islam
- Status: Defunct

Location
- Location: Bitola, North Macedonia
- Coordinates: 41°01′51″N 21°20′06″E

Architecture
- Type: mosque
- Style: Islamic, Ottoman
- Completed: 1558; 468 years ago

Specifications
- Dome: 1
- Minaret: 1
- Minaret height: 40 m

The Yeni Mosque (Macedonian: Јени џамија, romanized: Jeni džamija, Albanian: Jeni Xhamia, Turkish: Yeni Cami) situated in Bitola, North Macedonia, was built in 1558 by Kadi Mahmud-efendi. It is well known for its exquisite decorative ornaments and stalactites. The glazed decorative features found on the Yeni Mosque are the only examples of their kind in the country. Today, this mosque houses an art gallery. Yeni means "new" in Turkish.

== History ==
According to local legends, the mosque was constructed upon a site where once a church dedicated to St George had existed. This was confirmed in archaeological excavations in 2004-2010 under Gordana Filipovska Lazarovska which unearthed foundations of four basilicas and an older mosque on the foundations the Yeni Mosque was built.

The now-standing mosque was constructed during the reign of Sultan Suleyman I in 1558/59 by the order of the judge Mehmed Effendi. Its architecture resembles that of the main mosque of Bitola, the Ishak Celebi mosque and represents a transitional phase between the Early Ottoman Style and the Classical Ottoman style.

== See also ==
- Mustapha Pasha Mosque
