= Čiflik =

Čiflik or Çiflik may refer to:

- Chiflik (Ottoman Empire), an Ottoman system of land management

== Places ==
Albania

- Çiflik, a village in Konispol Municipality

North Macedonia

- Čiflik, Češinovo-Obleševo
- Čiflik, Delčevo, a village in Delčevo Municipality
- Čiflik, Demir Kapija
- Čiflik, Pehčevo
- Čiflik, Sopište
- Čiflik, Želino

Serbia

- Čiflik, Serbia, a village in Bela Palanka Municipality

== See also ==
- Chiflik (disambiguation)
- Čifluk (disambiguation)
- Čitluk (disambiguation)
