= Čitluk (disambiguation) =

Čitluk, Bosnia and Herzegovina is a town and municipality in Herzegovina.

Čitluk may also refer to:

== Bosnia and Herzegovina ==
- Čitluk, Goražde, a village in the east of the country
- Čitluk, Kozarska Dubica, Republika Srpska, a village in the north of the country
- Čitluk, Posušje, a village in the southwest of the country

== Croatia ==
- Čitluk, Sinj
- Čitluk, Promina, a village in the Promina municipality
- Lički Čitluk, Gospić

== Serbia ==
- Čitluk, Kruševac
- Čitluk, Ljubovija, Mačva district
- Čitluk, Mali Zvornik, Mačva district
- Čitluk (Priboj)
- Čitluk (Sjenica)
- Čitluk (Sokobanja)

== See also ==
- Brotnjo Čitluk, a football club based in the town of Čitluk
- Čiflik (disambiguation)
- Čifluk (disambiguation)
