= Opae =

Opae/Opajë Опае Opajë
- Village
- Location within North Macedonia
- Coordinates: 42°10′N 21°39′E
- Country: North Macedonia
- Region: Southeastern
- Municipality: Lipkovo

Population (2021)
  - Total: 1,619
- Time zone: UTC+1 (CET)
  - Summer (DST): UTC+2 (CEST)
- Car plates: KU
- Website: .

Opae (Macedonian: Опае, Albanian: Opajë) is a village in the municipality of Lipkovo, North Macedonia.

== Demographics ==
According to the statistics of the Bulgarian ethnographer Vasil Kanchov from 1900, 150 inhabitants lived in Opae, 100 Romani and 50 Muslim Albanians. As of the 2021 census, Opae had 1,169 residents with the following ethnic composition:

- Albanians 1,508
- Persons for whom data are taken from administrative sources 77
- Macedonians 32
- Others 2

According to the 2002 census, the village had a total of 1996 inhabitants. Ethnic groups in the village include:

- Albanians 1818
- Macedonians 138
- Serbs 38
- Others 2
