= Ropalce =

Ropalce Ропалце Ropalcë
- Village
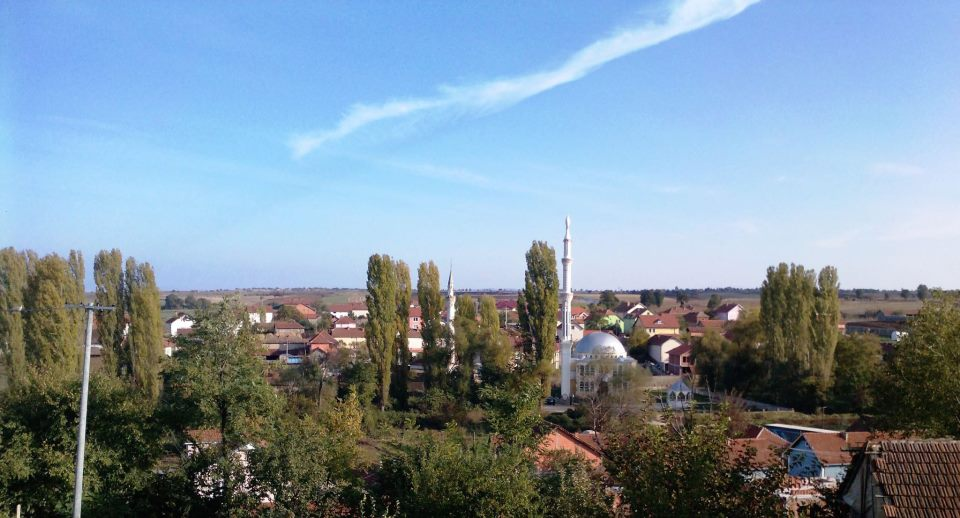
- View of the village

- Location within North Macedonia
- Coordinates: 42°07′N 21°37′E
- Country: North Macedonia
- Region: Southeastern
- Municipality: Lipkovo

Population (2021)
  - Total: 1,212
- Time zone: UTC+1 (CET)
  - Summer (DST): UTC+2 (CEST)
- Car plates: KU
- Website: .

Ropalce (Macedonian: Ропалце, Albanian: Ropalcë) is a village in the municipality of Lipkovo, North Macedonia.

== Demographics ==
As of the 2021 census, Ropalce had 1,212 residents with the following ethnic composition:

- Albanians 1,173
- Persons for whom data are taken from administrative sources 38
- Others 1

According to the 2002 census, the village had a total of 1,373 inhabitants. Ethnic groups in the village include:

- Albanians 1,355
- Serbs 7
- Macedonians 1
- Others 10
