= Kodža Mehmet Beg Mosque =

Mosque in Tabanovce, Kumanavo, North Macedonia

Coordinates: 42.2236°N 21.7003°E

Kodža Mehmet Beg Mosque Џамија Коџа Мехмет Бег Xhamia Koxha Mehmet Bej
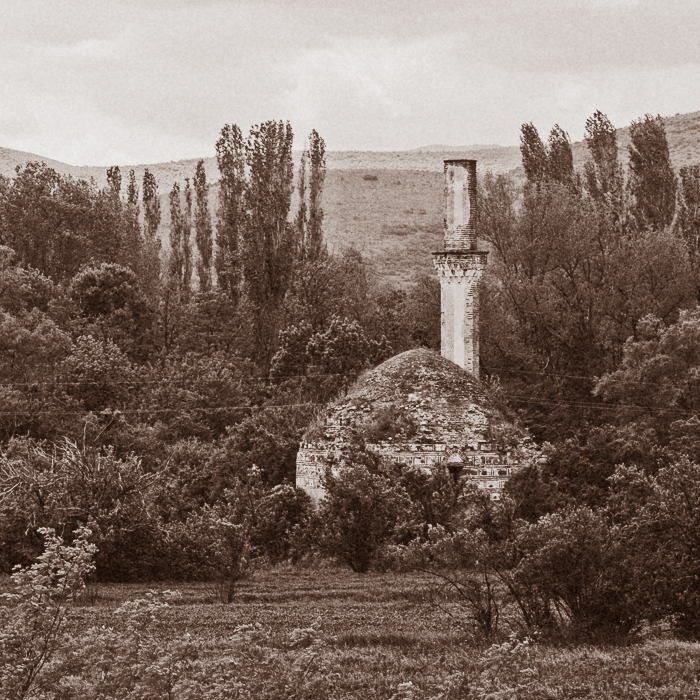
- Kodža Mehmet Beg Mosque near Kumanovo

Religion
- Affiliation: Sunni Islam
- Status: not in use

Location
- Location: Tabanovce, Kumanovo, North Macedonia
- Interactive map of Kodža Mehmet Beg Mosque; Џамија Коџа Мехмет Бег; Xhamia Koxha Mehmet Bej

Architecture
- Type: mosque
- Style: Arabian Architecture
- Completed: 890; 1136 years ago

Specifications
- Dome: 1
- Minaret: 1
- Materials: stone

Website
- bfi.mk

Kodža Mehmet Beg Mosque (Macedonian: Џамија Коџа Мехмет Бег; Albanian: Xhamia Koxha Mehmet Bej) is a Sunni mosque in the village of Tabanovce, Kumanovo Municipality, North Macedonia.

== See also ==
- Islamic Religious Community of North Macedonia
- Muftiship of Kumanovo
- Kumanovo
