= Strima =

Strima Стрима Strimë
- Village
- Location within North Macedonia
- Coordinates: 42°09′N 21°32′E
- Country: North Macedonia
- Region: Southeastern
- Municipality: Lipkovo

Population (2021)
  - Total: 9
- Time zone: UTC+1 (CET)
  - Summer (DST): UTC+2 (CEST)
- Car plates: KU
- Website: .

Strima (Macedonian: Стрима, Albanian: Strimë) is a village in the municipality of Lipkovo, North Macedonia.

== Demographics ==
As of the 2021 census, Strima had 9 residents with the following ethnic composition:

- Persons for whom data are taken from administrative sources 9

According to the 2002 census, the village had a total of 3 inhabitants. Ethnic groups in the village include:

- Albanians 3
