= Hafizi (surname) =

Hafizi is a surname of Albanian origin. Notable people with the surname include:

- Astrit Hafizi (born 1953), Albanian footballer and coach
- Mimoza Hafizi (born 1962), Albanian politician

== See also ==
- Hafiz (name)
- Hafizi Isma'ilism
