= Khafizov =

Khafizov (Russian: Хафизов) is a Turkic masculine surname; its feminine counterpart is Khafizova. It is a slavicised version of Hafiz with suffix '-ov'. Notable people with the surname include:

- Oleg Khafizov (born 1959), Russian writer
- Vadim Khafizov (born 1970), Russian football coach
