= R'nkovce =

R'nkovce Р'нковце Hërkoc
- Village
- Location within North Macedonia
- Coordinates: 42°10′N 21°33′E
- Country: North Macedonia
- Region: Southeastern
- Municipality: Lipkovo

Population (2021)
  - Total: 0
- Time zone: UTC+1 (CET)
  - Summer (DST): UTC+2 (CEST)
- Car plates: KU
- Website: .

R'nkovce (Macedonian: Р'нковце, Albanian: Hërkoc, Orkoc) is a village in the municipality of Lipkovo, North Macedonia.

== Demographics ==
As of the 2021 census, R'nkovce had zero residents.

According to the 2002 census, the village had a total of 21 inhabitants. Ethnic groups in the village include:

- Albanians 21
