= Hafiz Ibrahim Kawu =

Nigerian politician

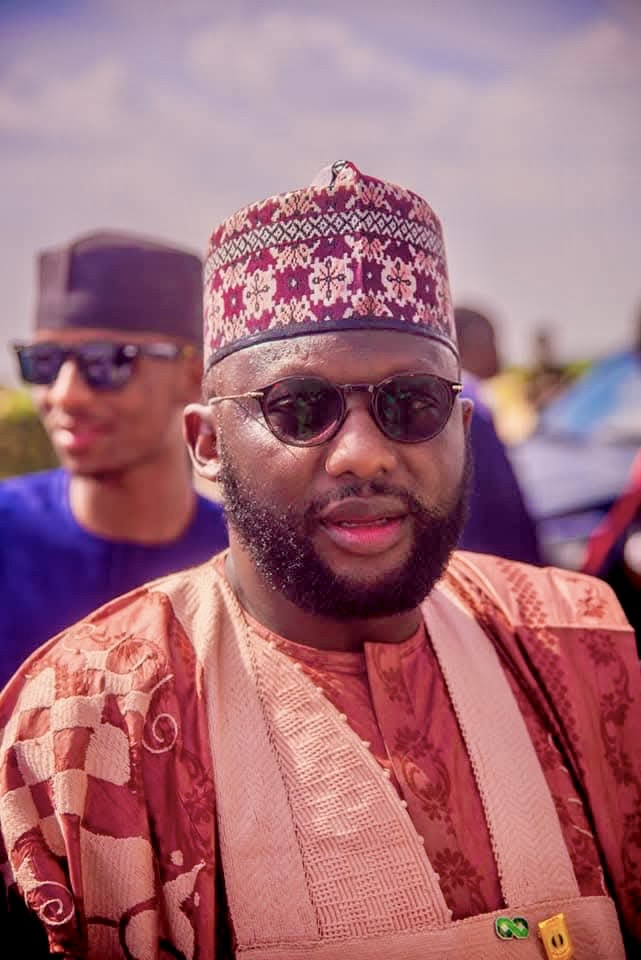

Hafiz Ibrahim Kawu (born on 16th January 1984) is a Nigerian politician and public administrator who has served in various legislative and executive capacities. He is the current Executive Commissioner (Technical) National Pension Commission (PenCom) representing the Northwest, appointed on 07 August 2025 by President Asiwaju Bola Ahmed Tinubu, GCFR.

== Early life and education ==
Kawu was born on 16 January 1984 in Kano State, Nigeria. He attended Fouad Lababidi Islamic Academy in Abuja and later attended Bayero University, Kano, where he earned a degree in Chemistry.

== Political and public service career ==
=== Special Assistant to the Vice President (2015–2019) ===
From 2015 to 2019, Kawu served as Special Assistant to the former Vice President of Nigeria, Professor Yemi Osinbajo, SAN, GCON, focusing on political strategy, constituency engagement, and policy coordination.

=== Member, House of Representatives (2019–2023) ===
In the 2019 general elections, Kawu was elected as the Member representing Tarauni Federal Constituency in the House of Representatives under the platform of the All Progressives Congress (APC). During his tenure, he contributed to legislative debates, oversight functions, and constituency projects.

=== Executive Commissioner, National Pension Commission (2025–present) ===
On 11 August 2025, Kawu was appointed Executive Commissioner (Technical)of the National Pension Commission (PenCom) by President Tinubu, with a mandate to help oversee Nigeria’s pension industry and drive reforms in pension administration.

== Honors and recognition ==
In October 2022, he was conferred with the Officer of the Order of the Niger (OON) by the then President, Muhammadu Buhari, GCFR, in recognition of his service to the nation.

Kawu is also a Member of the National Institute for Policy and Strategic Studies (NIPSS), earning the designation mni.
