= Čifluk, Visoko =

Čifluk
- Village
- Location within Bosnia and Herzegovina
- Coordinates: 43.9834992°N 18.2248377°E
- Country: Bosnia and Herzegovina
- Entity: Federation of Bosnia and Herzegovina
- Canton: Zenica-Doboj
- Municipality: Visoko

Area
  - Total: 1.43 sq mi (3.71 km^{2})

Population (2013)
  - Total: 108
  - Density: 75.4/sq mi (29.1/km^{2})
- Time zone: UTC+1 (CET)
  - Summer (DST): UTC+2 (CEST)

Čifluk is a village in the municipality of Visoko, Bosnia and Herzegovina. It is located on the western banks of the River Bosna.

== Demographics ==
According to the 2013 census, its population was 108.

Ethnicity in 2013
Ethnicity	Number	Percentage
Bosniaks	107	99.1%
other/undeclared	1	0.9%
Total	108	100%
