= Ishak Çelebi Mosque =

Mosque in Bitola, North Macedonia

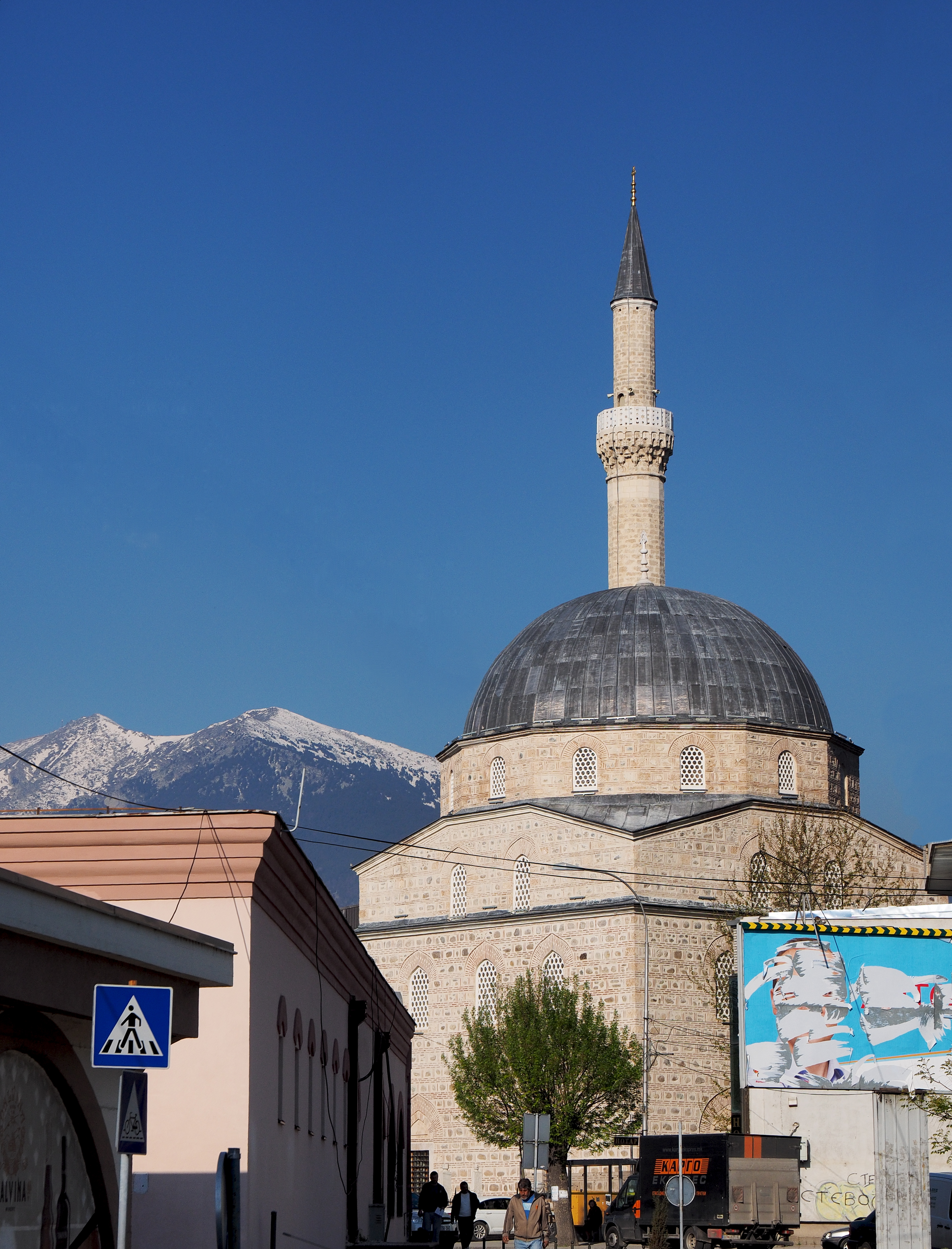

- Location within North Macedonia

Religion
- Affiliation: Islam

Location
- Location: Bitola, North Macedonia
- Coordinates: 41.001055°N 21.200005°E

Architecture
- Type: mosque
- Style: Islamic, Ottoman
- Completed: 1506; 520 years ago

Specifications
- Dome: 1
- Minaret: 1

The Ishak Çelebi Mosque (Macedonian: Исак џамија, romanized: Isak džamija, Albanian: Xhamia e Isak Çelebiut, Turkish: İshakiye Camii) is the largest mosque in Bitola, North Macedonia. It is situated along the north bank of the Dragor River. This area was known as Bit-Pazar in the quarter of Emir Bey or Eyne Bey, also known as Ishak Çelebi mahalle.

== History ==
Popularly known as Ishakkiye, this mosque was named after its founder, Judge Ishak Çelebi, son of Isa Fakıh and was built in 1506. The marble plaque and the inscription is written in eight verses divided in eight equal fields. The date is given as a chronogram and is written in Nesih:

Help (is coming) in the name of Allah, the Merciful,
the Compassionate
the old house was beautified by the chronogram
His noble Ishak ibn Isa, may his happiness last,
May His honor increase in Paradise
He built the mosque, fortunately for us.
By that he acquired the Omniscient’s mercy.
Afterwards, inspired, he dictated a chronogram:
He arrived in the name of Allah, the Merciful, the compassionate
