= Hafiz Baxish =

Azerbaijani poet

Hafiz Baxish (full name: Hafiz Habib oghlu Baxishov) (1932–1989) was an Azerbaijani poet.

== Life ==
Baxish was born in Upper Giretagh village of Gafan region in Zengezur district, in modern-day Armenia.

He worked as a school teacher in the nearby Govshud village in 1950-1952 and then studied theatre and cinema acting in Azerbaijan State Theater Institute. While a student, he acted as a director of an amateur acting group. In 1956-1961 he worked as a tutor as well as a director of a recreation center in Sumgayit, Azerbaijan.

In 1961, he acted first as an assistant director, then director, and senior director at Azerbaijan State Radio and Television Committee. His first poem was published on “Socialist Sumgayit” newspaper. His first poem entitled “Samur-Devechi channel” was published on the same newspaper in 1957. Although he published six more poems afterwards, he was better known for his lyrics, which were used extensively in musical compositions.

He died on September 4, 1989.

== Poems ==
- "I am a son of Azerbaijan"
- "Nightingales"
- "I won’t let my love die"
- "I have missed mountains"
- "Life is like a leaf"
- "Mother sings a lulluby" 111
