= Hafiz Abdur Rahim =

- Died: 2003
- Occupation: Taliban leader
- Known for: Appointed the Taliban's deputy military leader

Hafiz Abdur Rahim was a Taliban leader.

In January 2003, BBC News reported he was hiding in Spin Boldak, one of Afghanistan's two main border crossings with Pakistan.

Mullah Omar appointed him the Taliban's deputy military leader in 2003, a position he held until his death later that year.
