= Čitluk, Goražde =

Čitluk
- Village
- Location within Bosnia and Herzegovina
- Coordinates: 43°39′26″N 18°53′01″E
- Country: Bosnia and Herzegovina
- Entity: Federation of Bosnia and Herzegovina
- Canton: Bosnian-Podrinje Goražde
- Municipality: Goražde

Area
  - Total: 0.73 sq mi (1.89 km^{2})
- Elevation: 1,770 ft (540 m)

Population (2013)
  - Total: 152
  - Density: 208/sq mi (80.4/km^{2})
- Time zone: UTC+1 (CET)
  - Summer (DST): UTC+2 (CEST)

Čitluk is a village in the municipality of Goražde, Bosnia and Herzegovina.

== Demographics ==
According to the 2013 census, its population was 18.

Ethnicity in 2013
| Ethnicity | Number | Percentage |
|---|---|---|
| Bosniaks | 149 | 98.0% |
| Serbs | 1 | 0.7% |
| other/undeclared | 2 | 1.3% |
| Total | 152 | 100% |
