= Čifluk, Travnik =

Čifluk
- Village
- Location within Bosnia and Herzegovina
- Coordinates: 44.222881°N 17.7330554°E
- Country: Bosnia and Herzegovina
- Entity: Federation of Bosnia and Herzegovina
- Canton: Central Bosnia
- Municipality: Travnik

Area
  - Total: 0.34 sq mi (0.87 km^{2})

Population (2013)
  - Total: 105
  - Density: 310/sq mi (120/km^{2})
- Time zone: UTC+1 (CET)
  - Summer (DST): UTC+2 (CEST)

Čifluk is a village in the municipality of Travnik, Bosnia and Herzegovina.

== Demographics ==
According to the 2013 census, its population was 105, all Croats.
