= Hafiz Razi =

Iranian statesman (died 1422)

Khwaja Ghiyath al-Din Muhammad Hafiz Razi (d. April/May 1422) was an Iranian statesman and military commander who served the Timurid Empire in the early 15th-century.

A native of the city of Yazd in southern Iran, Hafiz Razi was a Sufi who had memorized the Quran and could speak seven languages. His career started under the service of the Timurid prince Iskandar, who appointed him as his deputy. According to the Mu'izz al-ansab, Hafiz Razi was also Iskandar's chief vizier.

== Sources ==
- Manz, Beatrice Forbes (2007). Power, Politics and Religion in Timurid Iran. Cambridge University Press. ISBN 978-1-139-46284-6.
- Manz, Beatrice Forbes (2020). "Iranian Elites under the Timurids". In Steenbergen, Jo Van (ed.). Trajectories of State Formation across Fifteenth-Century Islamic West-Asia. Brill. pp. 257–282. ISBN 978-9004431300.
