= Hafız Selman İzbeli =

Hafız Selman İzbeli was a Turkish militia member in the Turkish War of Independence and the first female councilwoman in Kastamonu.

She was one of the founders of the women's branch of the "Association for Defence of National Rights" (Turkish: Müdâfaa-i Hukuk Cemiyeti).

== During the Turkish War of Independence ==
She gathered the women of Kastamonu, and made them knit socks, sweaters and flannel for the soldiers fighting in the Turkish War of Independence (1919–1923). She came from a wealthy family. When the soldiers came to Kastamonu, she met them all on the road and fed them all.

== Founding of the Republic ==
She would always say "Ben Cumhuriyetçiyim" ("I'm a Republican"). After the war, she learned to read and write with the new alphabet, which was adopted in 1928. She was recommended to be a member of parliament, however, she declined because she would have to uncover her head and she did not want to take off her headscarf. When the founder of the Republic Mustafa Kemal came to Kastamonu, it is said that he visited İzbeli's home and that they drank coffee together.

== Sources ==
- "Atatürk'le kahve içmiş" [They had coffee with Atatürk] (PDF). earsiv.sehir.edu.tr (in Turkish). Milliyet. pp. 4–5.
- Yusufoğlu, Kahraman (20 July 2011). Yusufoğlu, Selman (ed.). Atatürk'ten Hatıralar 4 - Çağdaş Cumhuriyet Kadını. Bayrampaşa-Istanbul: Nakkaş Yapım. p. 170. ISBN 978-6059828444.
