= Hafez Musa Ali Basha =

Albanian politician

Hafez Musa Ali Basha was an Albanian politician and mayor of Elbasan from 1928 to 1929.
