= Čifluk (Ilijaš) =

Čifluk Чифлук
- Village
- Location within Bosnia and Herzegovina
- Coordinates: 44°37′43″N 18°00′25″E
- Country: Bosnia and Herzegovina
- Entity: Federation of Bosnia and Herzegovina
- Municipality: Ilijaš
- Time zone: UTC+1 (CET)
  - Summer (DST): UTC+2 (CEST)

Čifluk (Cyrillic: Чифлук) is a village in the municipality of Ilijaš, Sarajevo Canton, Bosnia and Herzegovina.
