= Čiflik, Želino =

Čiflik Чифлик Çiflik
- Village
- Location within North Macedonia
- Coordinates: 41°57′05″N 21°07′14″E
- Country: North Macedonia
- Region: Polog
- Municipality: Želino

Population (2021)
  - Total: 1,033
- Time zone: UTC+1 (CET)
  - Summer (DST): UTC+2 (CEST)
- Car plates: TE
- Website: .

Čiflik (Macedonian: Чифлик, Albanian: Çiflik) is a village in the municipality of Želino, North Macedonia.

== Demographics ==
As of the 2021 census, Čiflik had 1,033 residents with the following ethnic composition:

- Albanians 1,023
- Persons for whom data are taken from administrative sources 10

According to the 2002 census, the village had a total of 1,180 inhabitants. Ethnic groups in the village include:

- Albanians 1,176
- Others 4
