= Lipkovo =

Lipkovo Липково Likovë
- Village
- Location within North Macedonia
- Coordinates: 42°09′N 21°35′E
- Country: North Macedonia
- Region: Northeastern
- Municipality: Lipkovo

Population (2021)
  - Total: 2,138
- Time zone: UTC+1 (CET)
  - Summer (DST): UTC+2 (CEST)
- Car plates: KU
- Website: .

Lipkovo (Macedonian: Липково, Albanian: Likovë) is a village in North Macedonia. It is the seat of Lipkovo Municipality.

== History ==
According to the statistics of the Bulgarian ethnographer Vasil Kanchov from 1900, 490 inhabitants lived in Lipkovo, 250 Muslim Albanians and 240 Christian Bulgarians.

Lipkovo was a strategic village during the 2001 insurgency in Macedonia between the National Liberation Army and the Macedonian Army, when the former captured its dam and cut off the water supply to Kumanovo, causing a crisis. It has a dam which supplies water and electricity to the Kumanovo region.

== Demographics ==
As of the 2021 census, Lipkovo had 2,138 residents with the following ethnic composition:

- Albanians 2,104
- Persons for whom data are taken from administrative sources 32
- Others 2

According to the 2002 census, the town had a total of 2644 inhabitants. Ethnic groups in the village include:

- Albanians 2,631
- Macedonians 2
- Others 11

== Sister Towns ==
- Mustafakemalpaşa, the main town of Bursa Province in the Marmara region of Turkey.
