= Mustafa Pasha Mosque =

Ottoman-era mosque in the Old Bazaar of Skopje, North Macedonia

Mustafa Pasha Mosque Мустафа-пашина џамија Xhamia e Mustafa Pashës Mustafa Paşa Camii
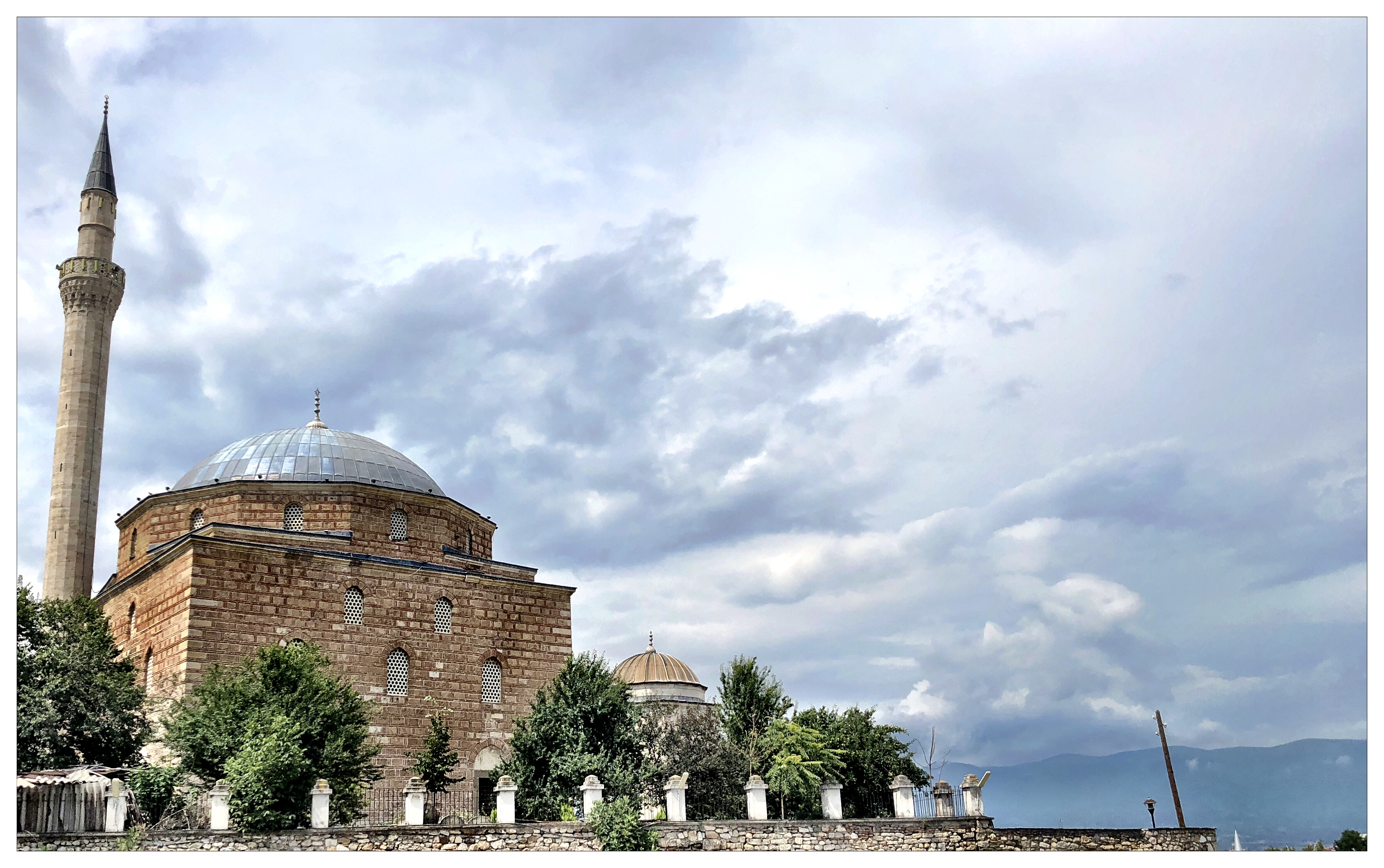

Religion
- Affiliation: Islam

Location
- Location: Skopje, North Macedonia
- Interactive map of Mustafa Pasha Mosque; Мустафа-пашина џамија Xhamia e Mustafa Pashës; Mustafa Paşa Camii
- Coordinates: 42°0′7″N 21°26′7.5″E

Architecture
- Type: mosque
- Style: Islamic, Late Classical Ottoman
- Completed: 1492; 534 years ago

Specifications
- Dome: 1
- Minaret: 1

Mustafa Pasha Mosque (Macedonian: Мустафа-пашина џамија; Albanian: Xhamia e Mustafa Pashës; Turkish: Mustafa Paşa Camii) is an Ottoman-era mosque located in the Old Bazaar of Skopje, North Macedonia.

== History ==
The structure stands on a plateau above the old bazaar, built in 1492 by Çoban Mustafa Pasha, who later became vizier on the court of Sultan Selim I (1512-1520). The mosque is largely intact from its original state, and no additions have been made through the years. The body of Umi, the daughter of Mustafa Pasha, is entombed in the türbe next to the mosque. The mosque has a rose garden.

The mosque had to undergo some reconstruction works due to an earthquake occurred in 1963. A five-year renovation of the mosque, funded by the Turkish government, was completed in August 2011.

== Architecture ==
The mosque was constructed with a Constantinople architectural style. Its dome has a diameter of 16.3 meters. Its minaret stands at a height of 47 meters. The marble plaque above its front door contains Arabic texts.

== Gallery ==
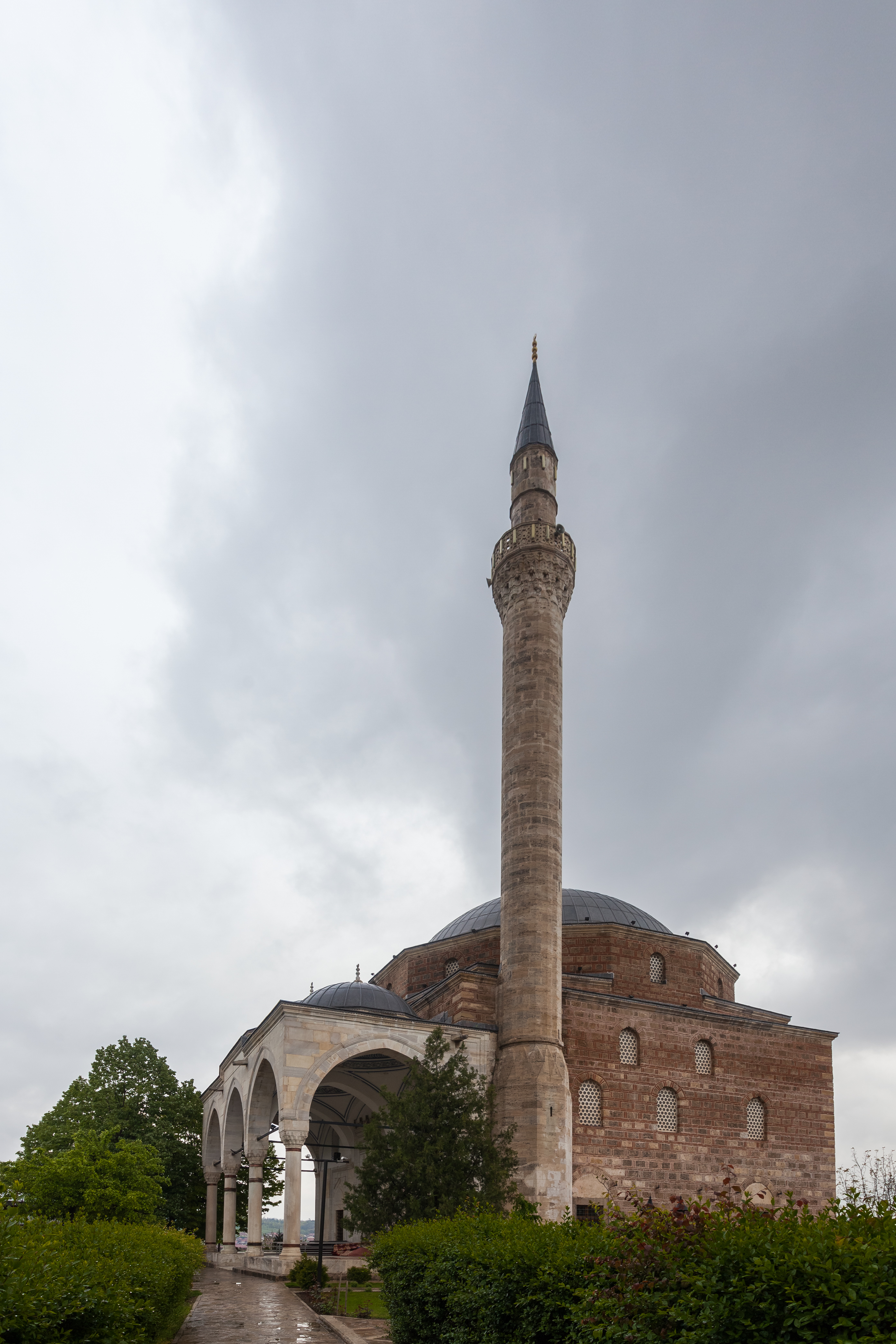

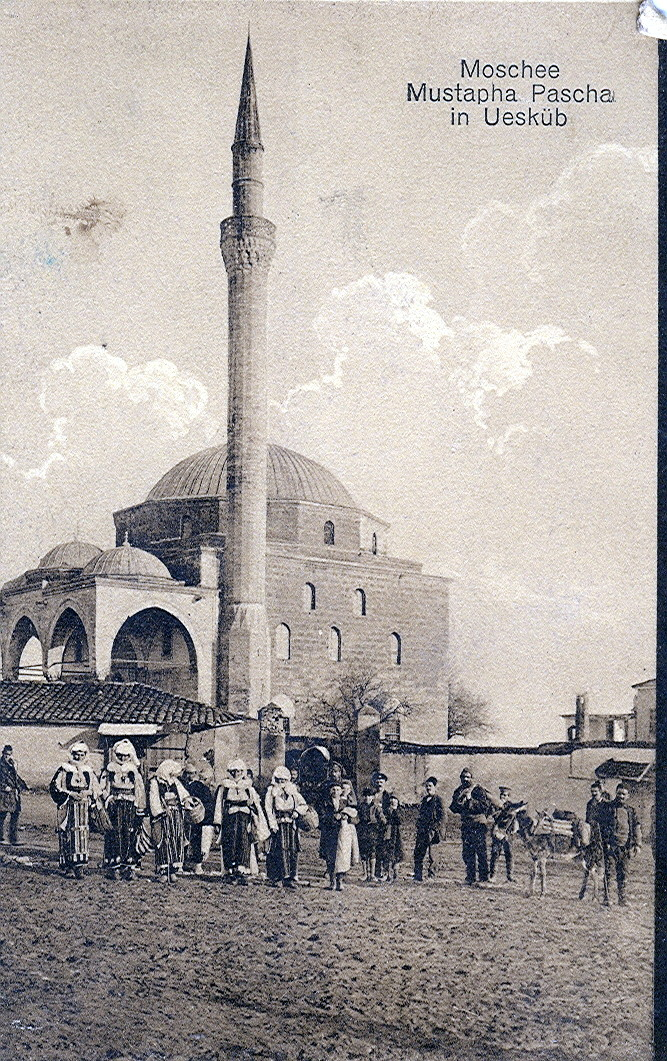
Historical image of Mustafa Pasha Mosque

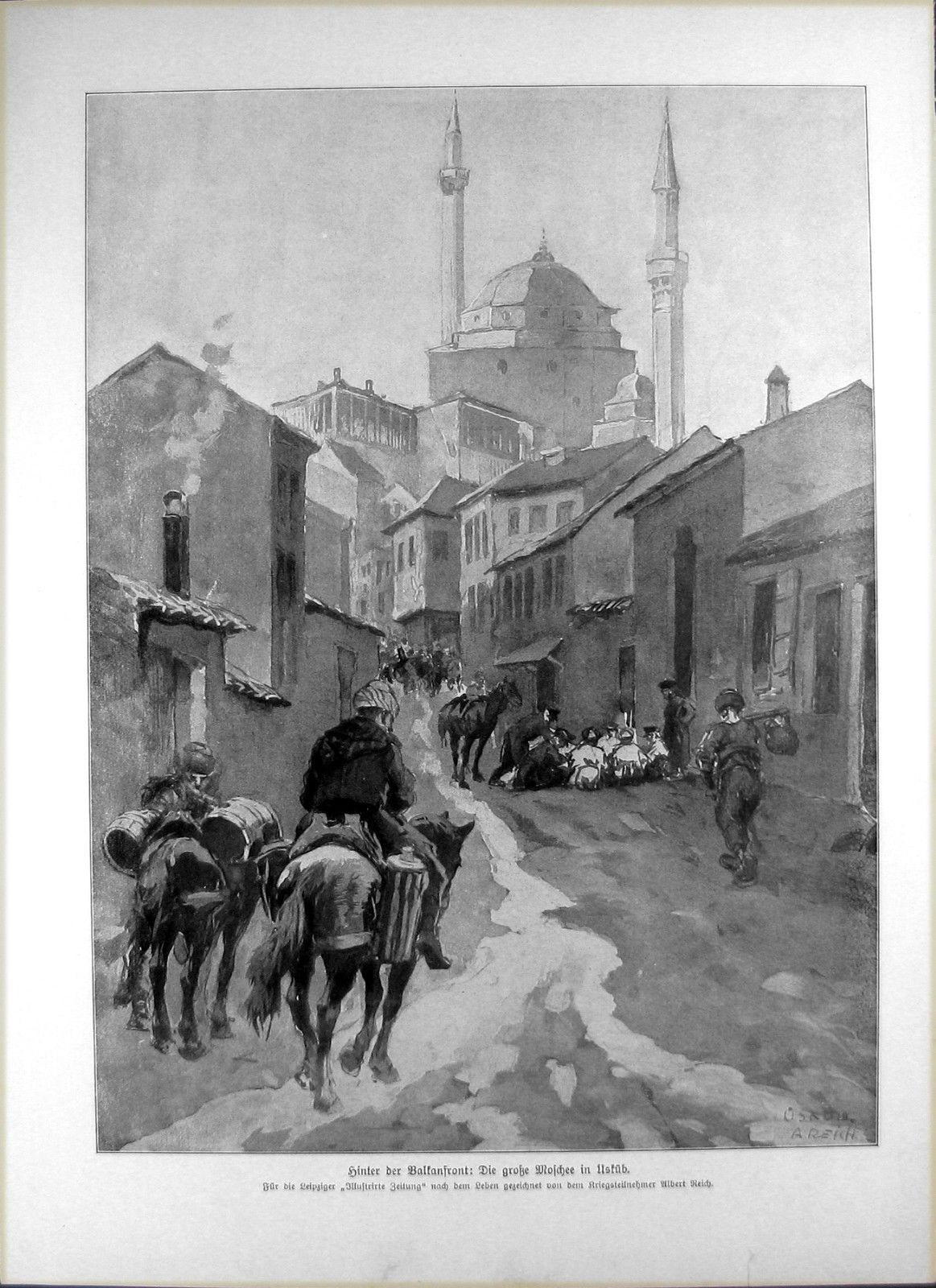

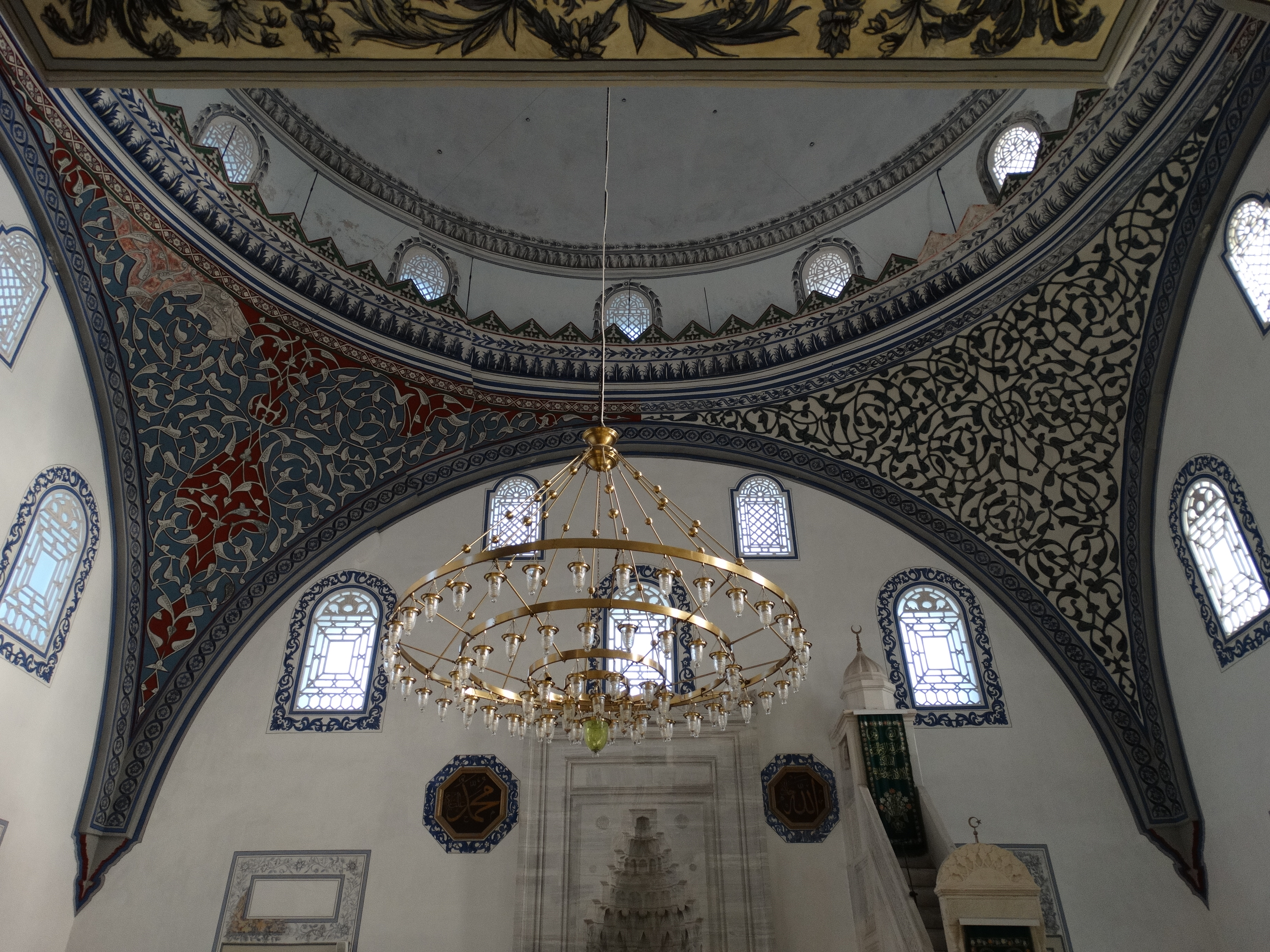
Interior

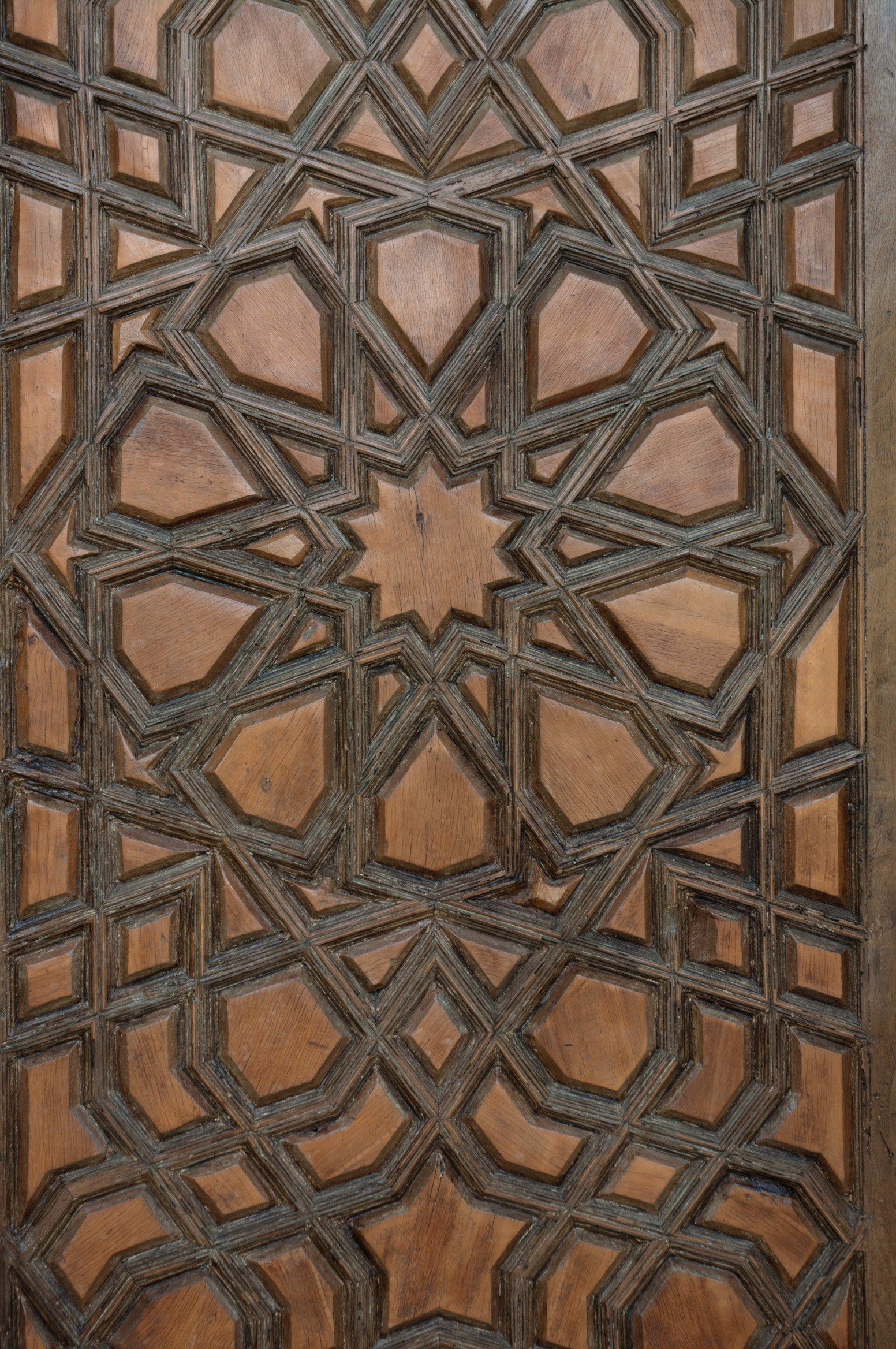
Entrance door

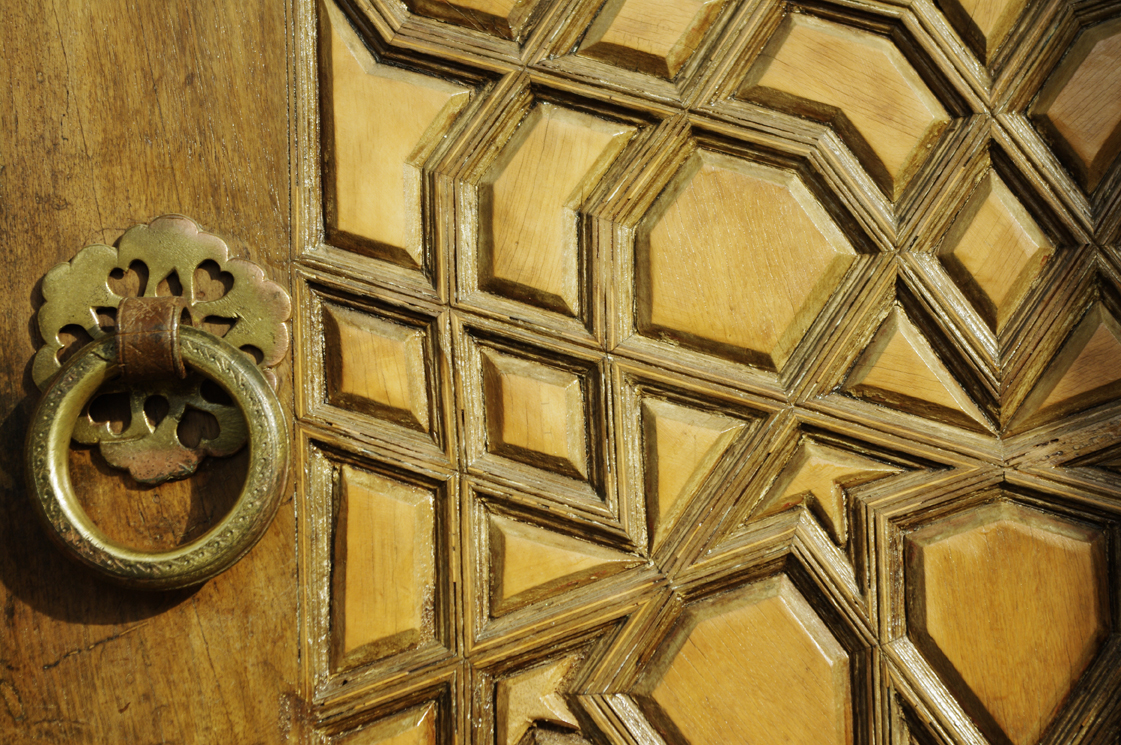
Entrance door

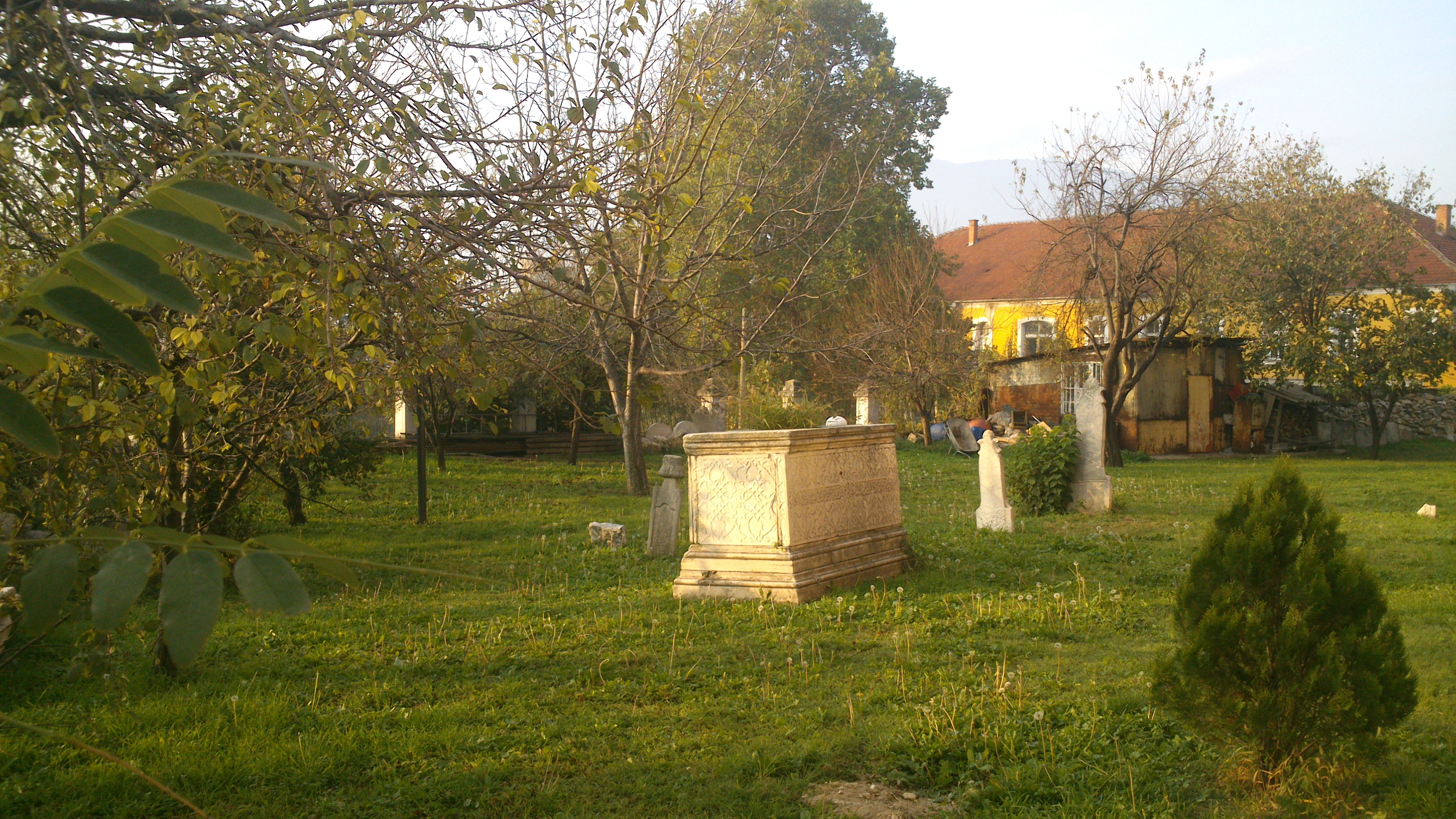

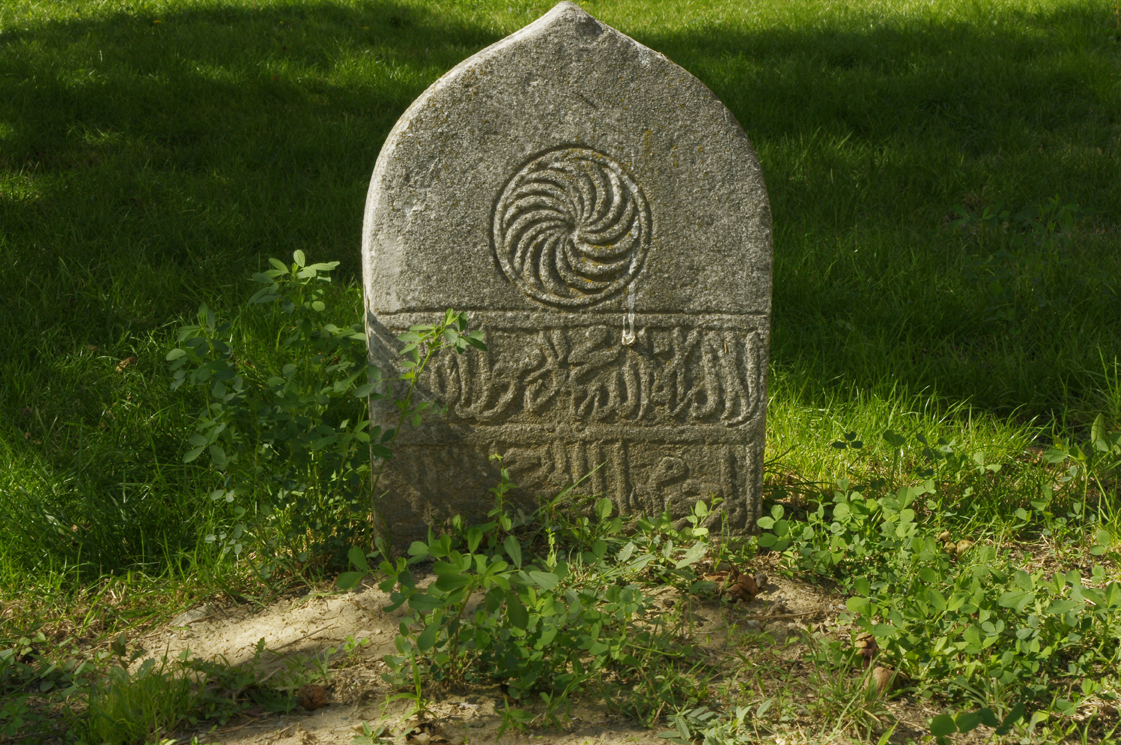
Old gravestone inscribed with the shahada
