= Islam in North Macedonia =

Islam in Europe by percentage of country population 95–100%: Azerbaijan; 90–95%: Turkey; Kosovo; 50–70%: Albania; Bosnia and Herzegovina; Kazakhstan; 30–35%: North Macedonia; 10–20%: France; Georgia; Montenegro; 5–10%: Austria; Bulgaria; Sweden; Belgium; Germany; Liechtenstein; Netherlands; Switzerland; United Kingdom; Denmark; Russia; Luxembourg; 4–5%: Serbia; 2–4%: Italy; Finland; Norway; Malta; Slovenia; Spain; Greece; Cyprus (Note: Only takes into account the Muslim population residing on land controlled by the Republic of Cyprus.); 1–2%: Croatia; Ireland; Ukraine; Andorra; < 1%: Iceland; Armenia; Belarus; Czech Republic; Estonia; Hungary; Latvia; Lithuania; Moldova; Monaco; Poland; Portugal; Romania; San Marino; Slovakia

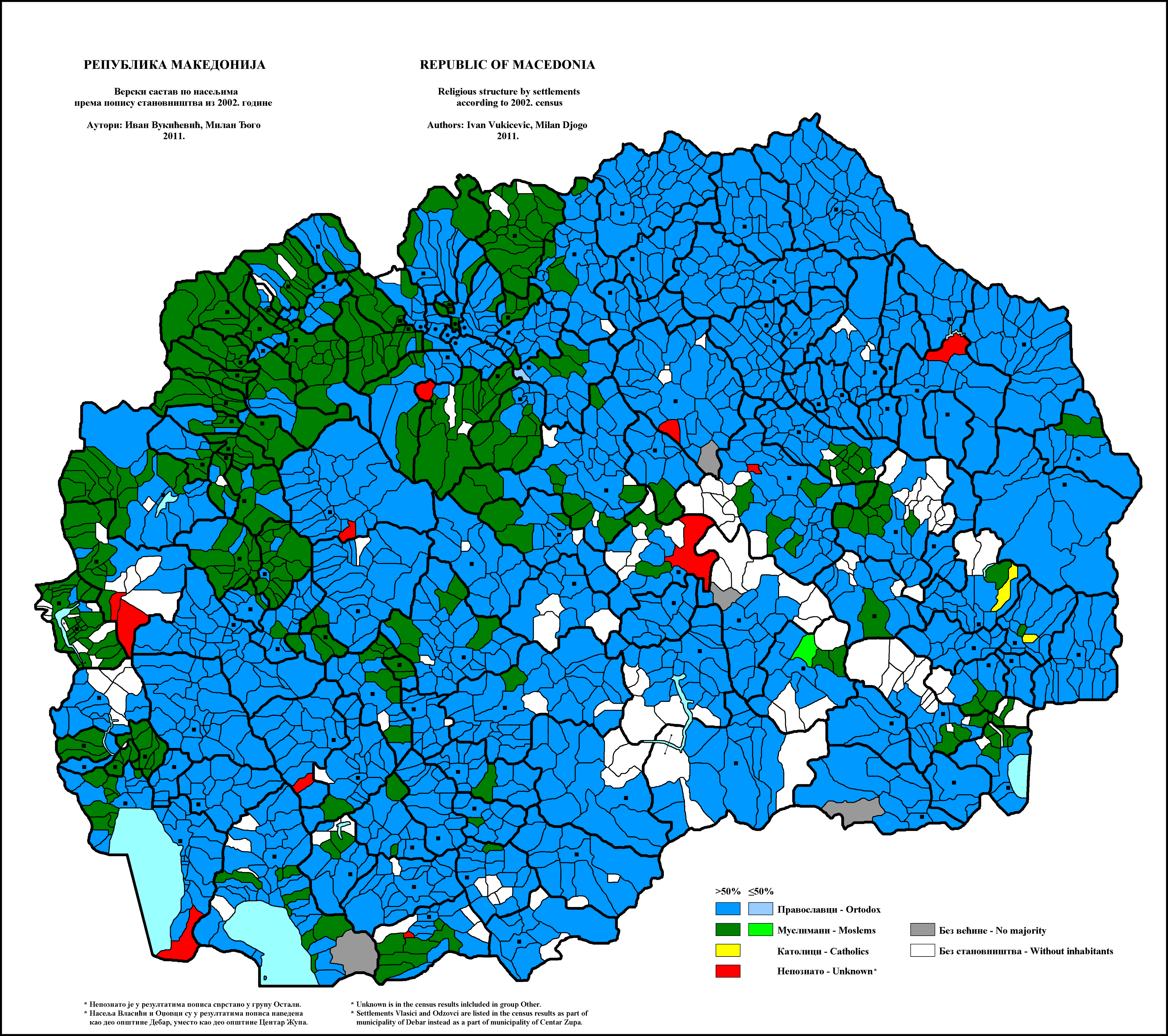
Religious structure of Macedonia by settlements 2002. Muslims (green), Orthodox Christian (blue)

Map of the muftiships of North Macedonia.

Muslims in North Macedonia represent just under one-third of the nation's total population according to the 2021 census, making Islam the second most widely professed religion in the country. Muslims in North Macedonia follow Sunni Islam of the Hanafi madhhab. Some northwestern and western regions of the country have Muslim majorities. A large majority of all the Muslims in the country are ethnic Albanians, with the rest being primarily Turks, Romani, Bosniaks or Torbeš.

== Population ==
=== Ethnicity ===
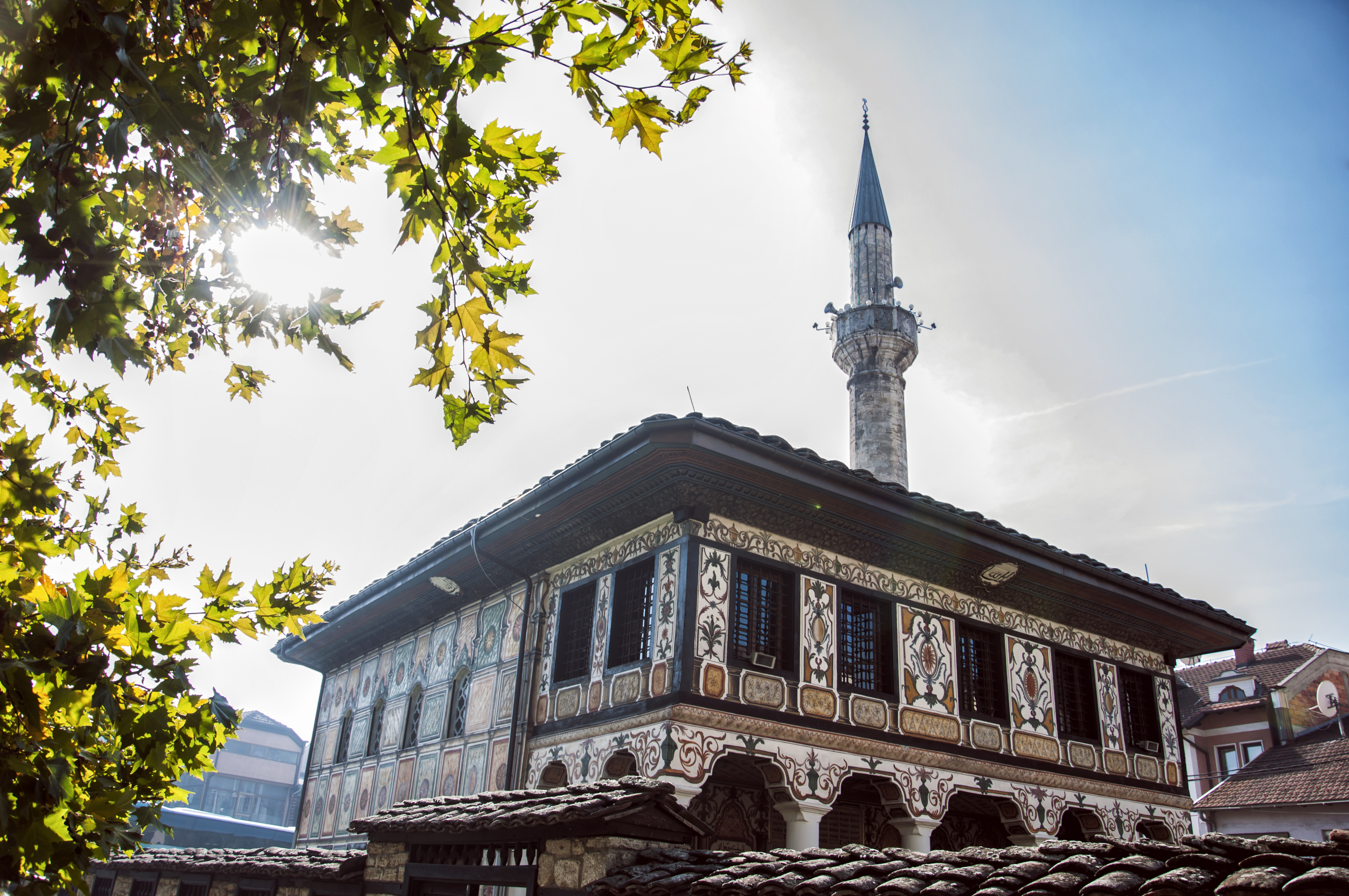
The Šarena Džamija, built in 1438, is a mosque in Tetovo.

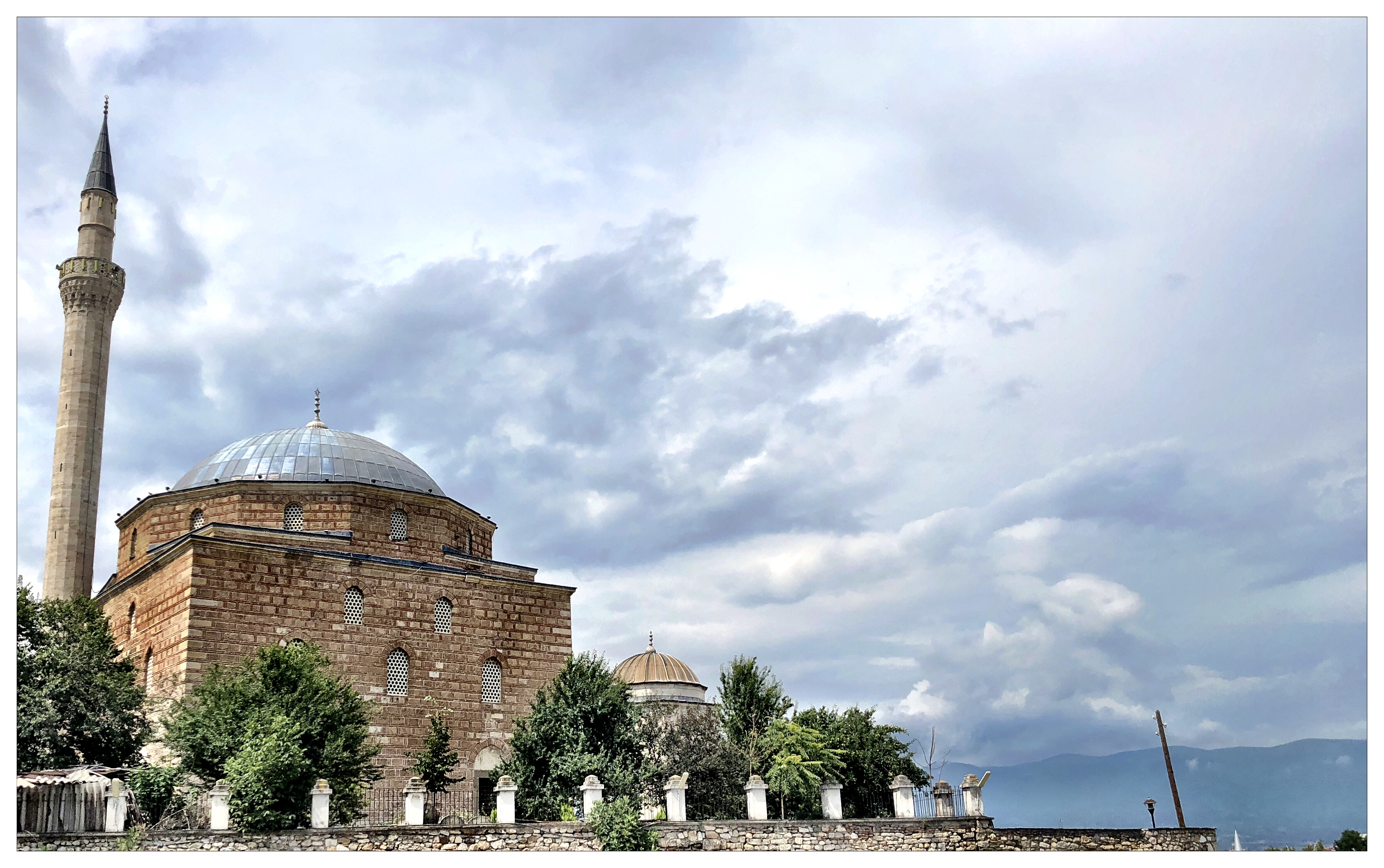
Mustafa Pasha Mosque in Skopje.

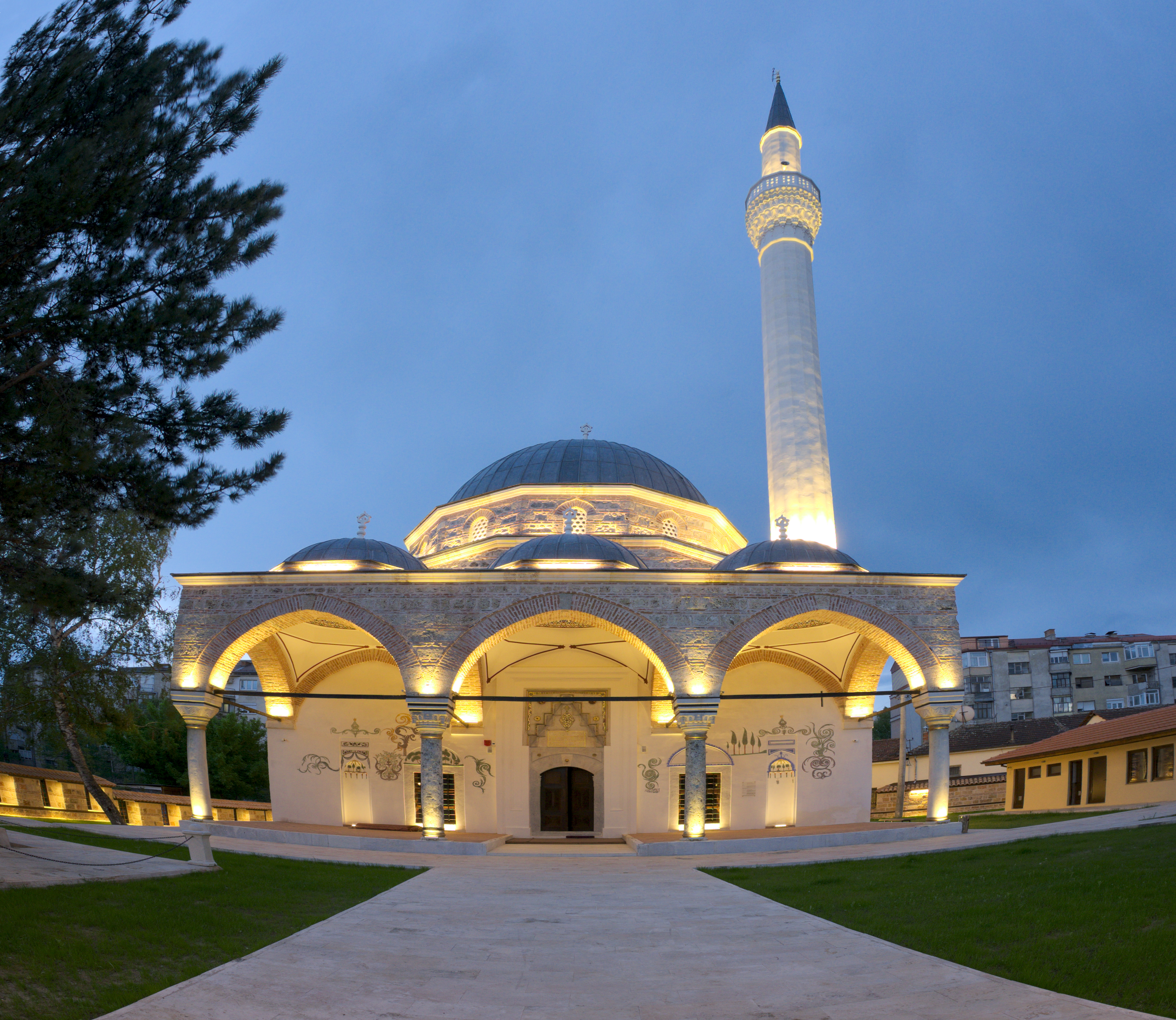
Gazi Hajdar Kadi Mosque in Bitola.

Albanian Muslims, forming roughly 25% of the nation's total population (2002 census), and most of the Muslim population, live mostly in the Polog and western regions of the country. The Turks, who make up about 4% of the country's total population (2002 census), are scattered throughout the country, but mostly in major cities, as are Roma Muslims. Bosniaks are mostly concentrated within Skopje. Muslims of Macedonian ethnicity number roughly 40,000 to 100,000 and can be found in the western part of North Macedonia in the Centar Župa, Debar, Struga and Plasnica areas.

Population of Macedonia according to ethnic affiliation in 1948, 2002 and 2021
Ethnic group	Population 1948	Population 2002	Population 2021
Albanians	197,389	509,083	446,245
Turks	95,940	77,959	70,961
Romani	19,500	53,879	46,433
Macedonian Muslims	1,560	2,553	1,187
Bosniaks	1,560	17,018	16,042

=== Historical population ===
The following table shows the Muslim population and percentage for each given year. The Muslim percentage in Macedonia generally decreased from 1904 to 1961 but began to rise again due to high fertility rate among Muslim families, reaching 33.33% in 2002. According to the census of 2021, the share of Muslims was 32.17% of the total (resident) population, which was slightly lower compared to 33.33% in the census of 2002.

Year	Muslim population	Muslim percentage
1904	634,000	36.76%
1912	384,000	33.47%
1921	269,000	31.43%
1948	314,603	27.29%
1953	388,515	29.78%
1961	338,200	24.05%
1971	414,176	25.14%
1981	546,437	28.62%
1991	611,326	30.06%
1994	581,203	30.04%
2002	674,015	33.33%
2021	590,878	32.17%

=== Geographic distribution ===
(according to the 2021 census)

Municipality	Statistical region	Population (2021)	Muslims (2021)	Percentage (%)
Tetovo	Polog	84,770	64,468	76.1%
Čair	Skopje (city)	62,586	50,755	81.1%
Gostivar	Polog	59,770	43,459	72.7%
Saraj	Skopje (city)	38,399	35,959	93.6%
Struga	Southwestern	50,980	32,231	63.2%
Kumanovo	Northeastern	98,104	28,528	29.1%
Lipkovo	Northeastern	22,308	21,570	96.7%
Bogovinje	Polog	22,906	21,329	93.1%
Kičevo	Southwestern	39,669	21,056	53.1%
Studeničani	Skopje (region)	21,970	19,968	90.9%
Šuto Orizari	Skopje (city)	25,726	19,350	75.2%
Vrapčište	Polog	19,842	18,224	91.8%
Želino	Polog	18,988	18,193	95.8%
Gazi Baba	Skopje (city)	69,626	17,476	25.1%
Butel	Skopje (city)	37,968	17,438	45.9%
Tearce	Polog	17,694	15,144	85.6%
Debar	Southwestern	15,412	13,611	88.3%
Aračinovo	Skopje (region)	12,676	12,363	97.5%
Dolneni	Pelagonia	13,126	8,873	67.6%
Bitola	Pelagonia	85,164	8,232	9.7%
Brvenica	Polog	13,645	7,386	54.1%
Veles	Vardar	48,463	6,286	13.0%
Ohrid	Southwestern	51,428	5,908	11.5%
Prilep	Pelagonia	69,025	5,063	7.3%
Čaška	Vardar	7,942	4,710	59.3%
Radoviš	Southeastern	24,122	4,470	18.5%
Strumica	Southeastern	49,995	4,331	8.7%
Plasnica	Southwestern	4,222	4,115	97.5%
Štip	Eastern	44,866	3,798	8.5%
Gjorče Petrov	Skopje (city)	44,844	3,680	8.2%
Mavrovo and Rostuša	Polog	5,042	3,669	72.8%
Karpoš	Skopje (city)	63,760	3,629	5.7%
Petrovec	Skopje (region)	9,150	3,588	39.2%
Jegunovce	Polog	8,895	3,522	39.6%
Resen	Pelagonia	14,373	3,423	23.8%
Centar Župa	Southwestern	3,720	3,346	89.9%
Kruševo	Pelagonia	8,385	2,859	34.1%
Vasilevo	Southeastern	10,552	2,557	24.2%
Centar	Skopje (city)	43,893	2,507	5.7%
Kisela Voda	Skopje (city)	61,965	2,267	3.7%
Aerodrom	Skopje (city)	77,735	2,184	2.8%
Sopište	Skopje (region)	6,713	2,159	32.2%
Kočani	Eastern	31,602	2,069	6.5%
Valandovo	Southeastern	10,508	1,435	13.7%
Čučer-Sandevo	Skopje (region)	9,200	1,363	14.8%
Kavadarci	Vardar	35,733	1,157	3.2%
Negotino	Vardar	18,194	1,105	6.1%
Vinica	Eastern	14,475	942	6.5%
Karbinci	Eastern	3,420	865	25.3%
Ilinden	Skopje (region)	17,435	855	4.9%
Gradsko	Vardar	3,233	740	22.9%
Bosilovo	Southeastern	11,508	702	6.1%
Delčevo	Eastern	13,585	694	5.1%
Zelenikovo	Skopje (region)	3,361	654	19.5%
Konče	Southeastern	2,725	607	22.3%
Pehčevo	Eastern	3,983	597	15.0%
Berovo	Eastern	10,890	514	4.7%
Demir Kapija	Vardar	3,777	419	11.1%
Kriva Palanka	Northeastern	18,059	418	2.3%
Mogila	Pelagonia	5,283	336	6.4%
Dojran	Southeastern	3,084	309	10.0%
Makedonski Brod	Southwestern	5,889	259	4.4%
Demir Hisar	Pelagonia	7,260	244	3.4%
Lozovo	Vardar	2,264	236	10.4%
Kratovo	Northeastern	7,545	108	1.4%
Gevgelija	Southeastern	21,582	104	0.5%
Sveti Nikole	Vardar	15,320	92	0.6%
Debarca	Southwestern	3,719	76	2.0%
Probištip	Eastern	13,417	57	0.4%
Bogdanci	Southeastern	7,339	52	0.7%
Rankovce	Northeastern	3,465	52	1.5%
Rosoman	Vardar	3,796	36	0.9%
Novaci	Pelagonia	2,648	35	1.3%
Makedonska Kamenica	Eastern	6,439	18	0.3%
Staro Nagoričane	Northeastern	3,501	14	0.4%
Vevčani	Southwestern	2,359	10	0.4%
Krivogaštani	Pelagonia	5,167	8	0.2%
Češinovo-Obleševo	Eastern	5,471	5	0.1%
Zrnovci	Eastern	2,086	4	0.2%
Novo Selo	Southeastern	6,972	3	0.0%
Macedonia (total)		1,836,713	590,878	32.2%

The Ss. Cyril and Methodius University of Skopje stated in 2012 that "religion is primary importance to Macedonia's Muslims." The university conducted a survey of 1.850 Muslims in the country, which found that 81.6% described themselves as religious, 60.5% of which were very religious. Approximately 22% never went to a mosque (48,6% attend mosque at least once a week) and 17.3% did not pray at home (42,1% pray five times a day). About 28,6% believed that disputes should be resolved using Islamic Sharia law (41,7% say that should be resolved using Macedonia's laws, 29,7% didn't know or refused to answer), and 27,8% said that wearing a veil in school was "unacceptable." 16,4% of the respondents said cohabitation without marriage was "acceptable" (74,2% said "non acceptable" and 9,3% refused to answer), 13,6% ate pork and 24,8% drank alcohol. Also 94% of respondents said they circumcised their boys and 98% observed Muslim burial practices for their relatives.

== Gallery ==
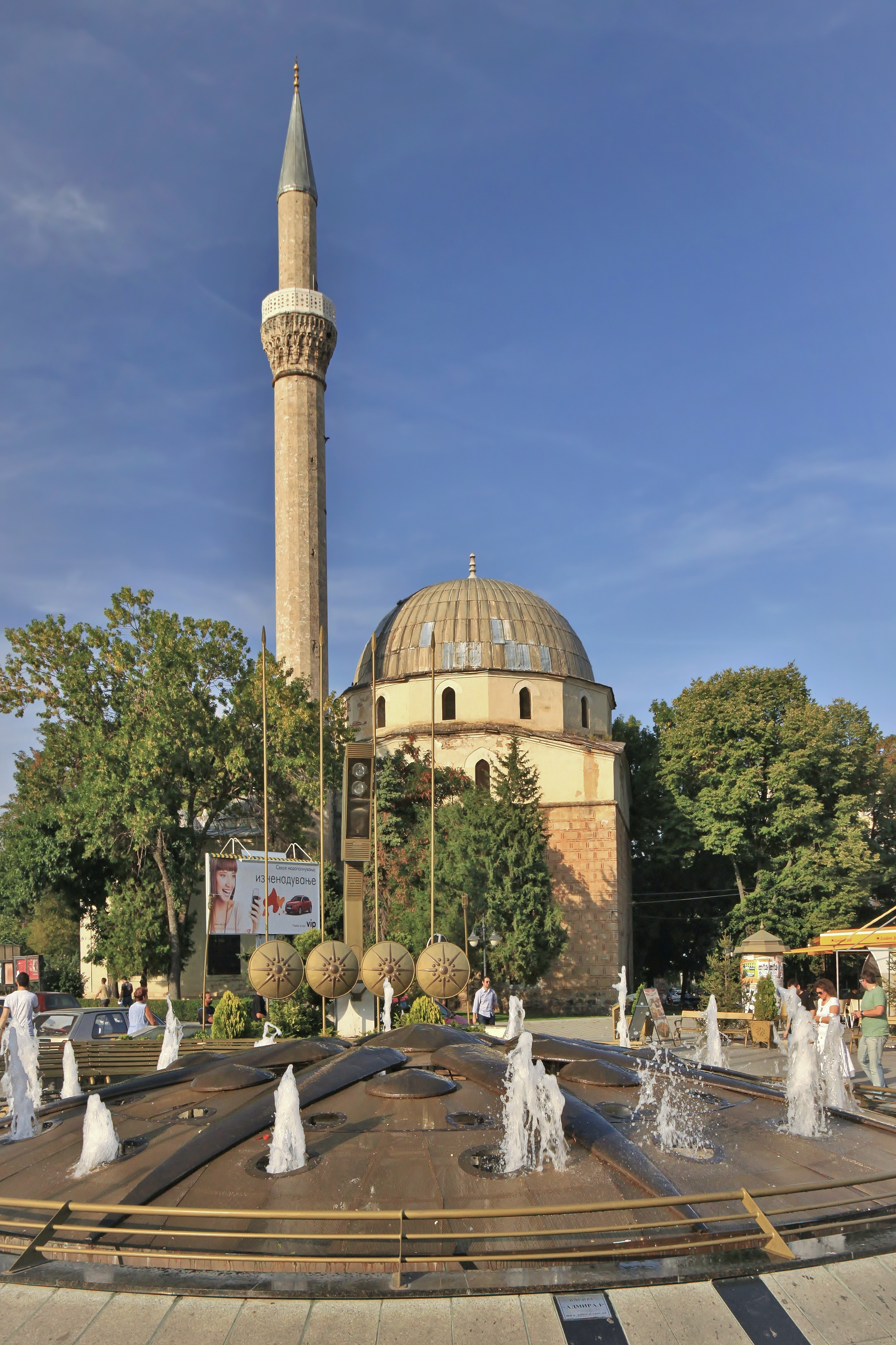
Yeni Mosque in Bitola

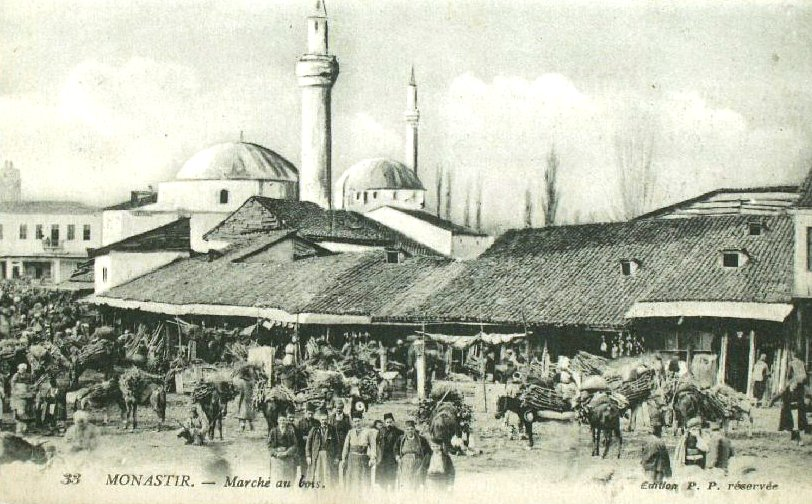
The Monastir (Bitola) bazaar in 1914.

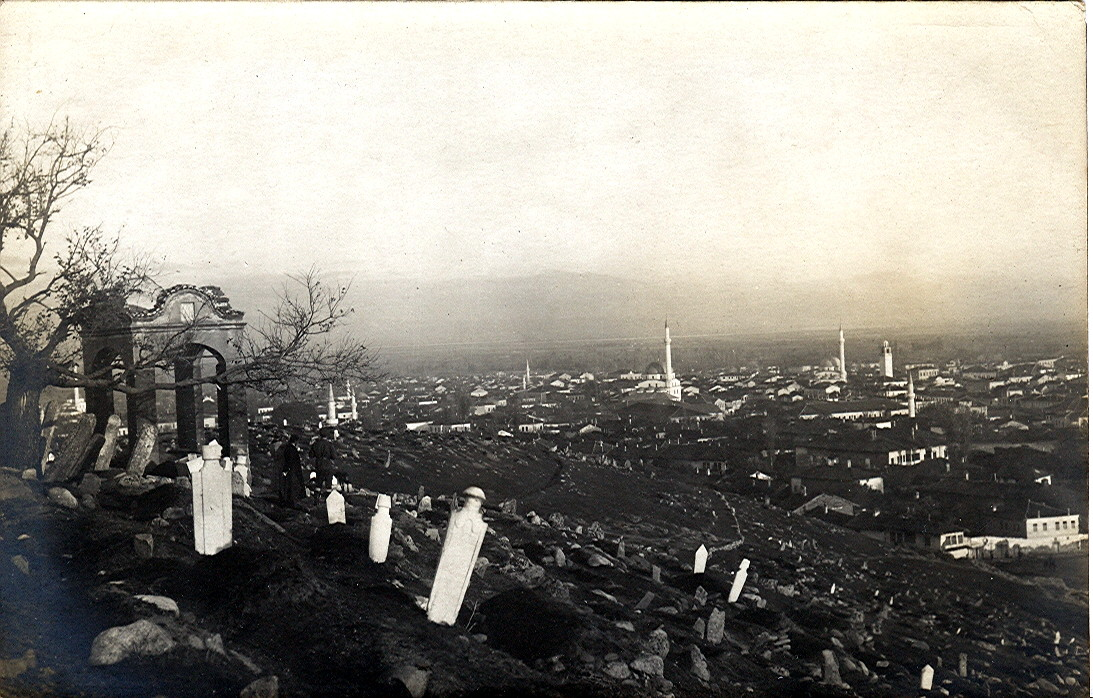
Mosques in Bitola

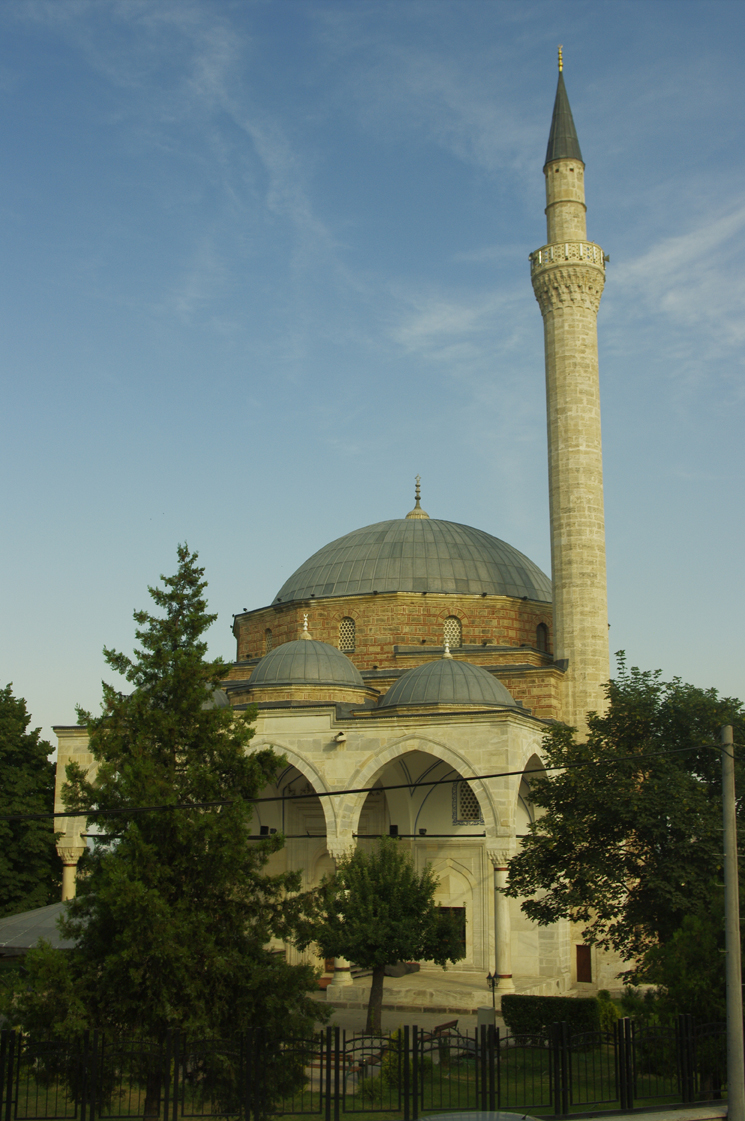
Mustafa Pasha's Mosque

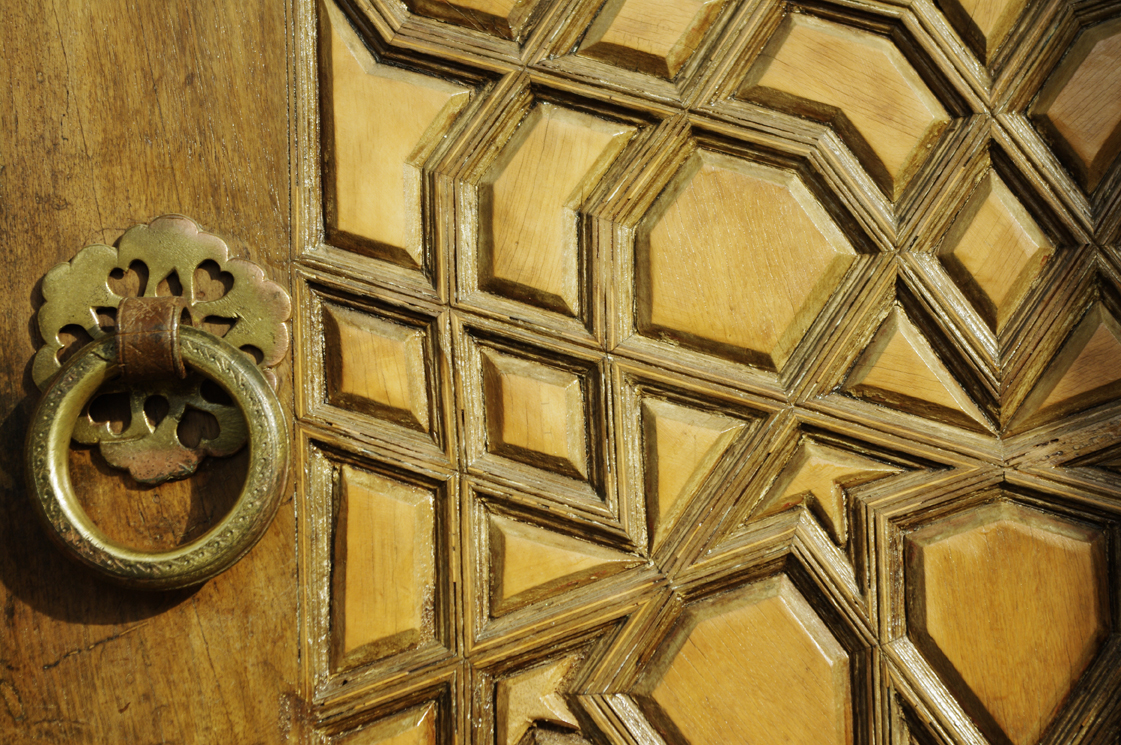
Door detail from Mustafa Pasha's Mosque

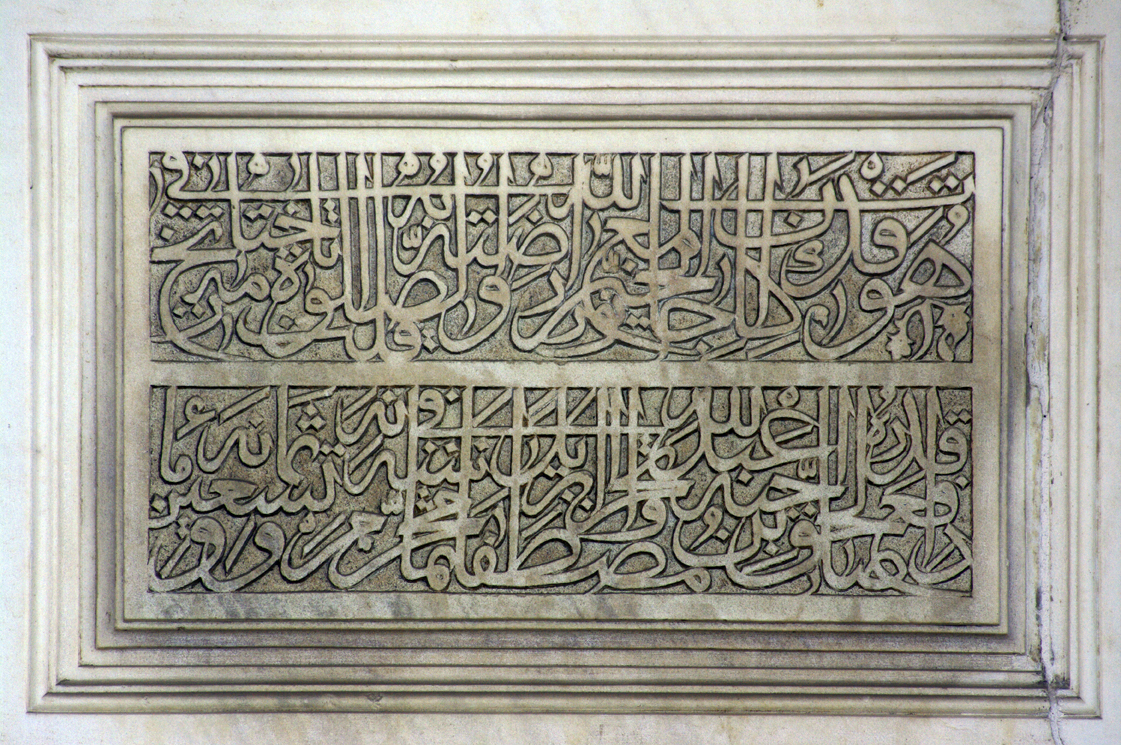
Islamic inscription from Mustafa Pasha's Mosque.

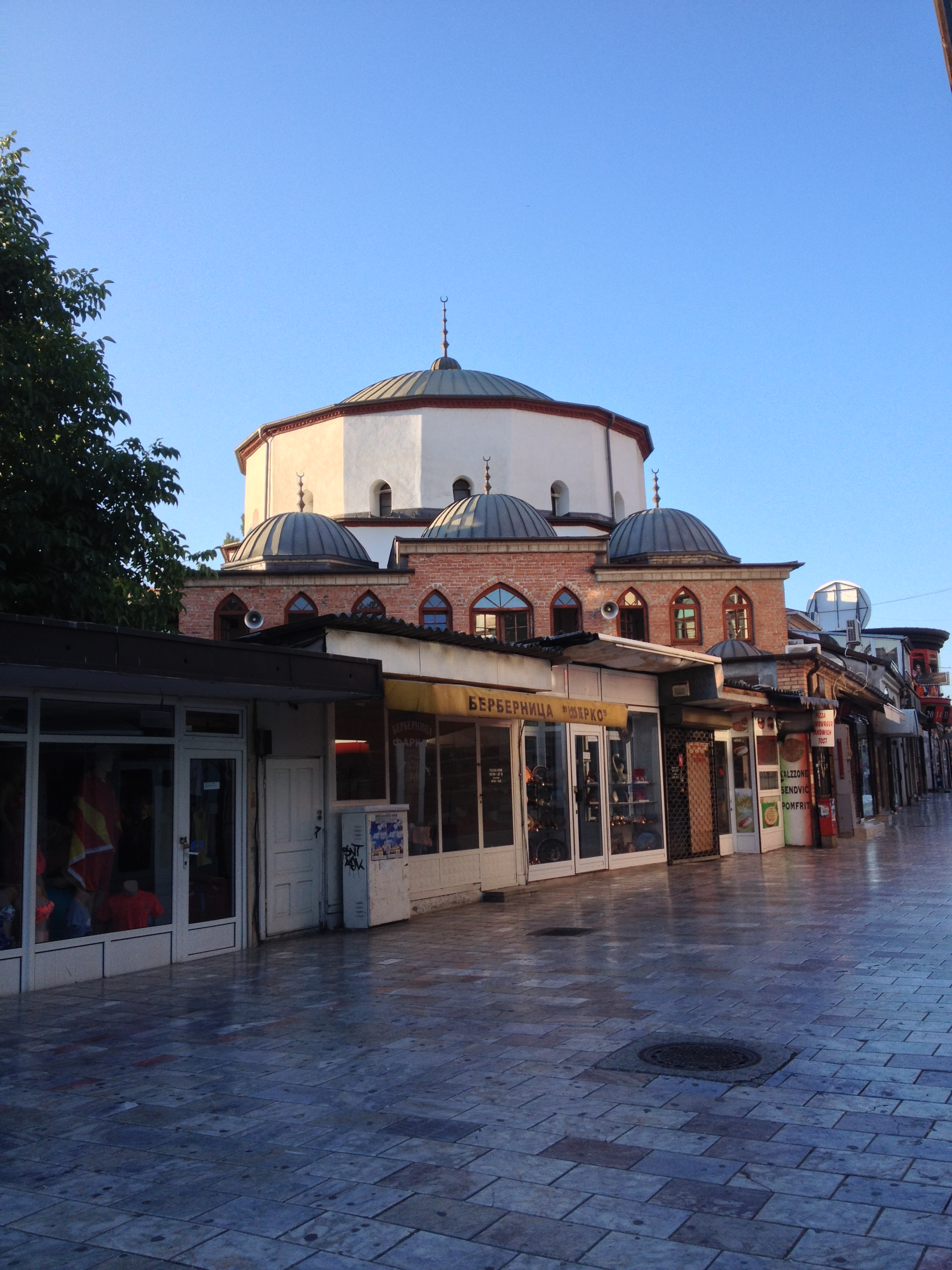
Mosque of Ali Pasha in Ohrid

== See also ==
- Demographics of North Macedonia
- Religion in North Macedonia
- Rumelia
- Albanians in North Macedonia
- Macedonian Muslims
- Turks in North Macedonia
- Romani in North Macedonia
- Bosniaks in North Macedonia
