= Islamic Religious Community of North Macedonia =

Religious organization in North Macedonia

The Islamic Religious Community of North Macedonia or IRC (Albanian: Bashkësia Fetare Islame e Maqedonisë së Veriut or BFI, Macedonian: Исламската Верска Заедница во Северна Македонија or ИВЗ) is a religious organisation of Muslims in the Republic of North Macedonia. The headquarter of the community is in Skopje and the current leader, titled Grand Mufti, is Shaqir Fetahu.

== History ==
There has been organized Islamic religious life in Macedonia since the time when Ottoman Empire started administering this region. All Sunni Muslims who lived in the Ottoman Empire were part of the Muslim community headed by the sultan, who replaced the role of the caliph. During the reign of the Sultan Murad II, the competences of the caliph were transferred to the grand mufti. Since then, the grand mufti was titled Sheykhul-Islam and was considered the highest religious authority within the Ottoman Empire. However, every region inhabited by Muslims had its own mufti, who was in lower position than the Sheykhul-Islam.

After the First World War, North Macedonia was under the Kingdom of Serbs, Croats and Slovenes. The Islamic community of the Kingdom was headed by Grand Mufti, whose office was in Sarajevo. The Grand Mufti responsibility was to organize the Islamic Religious life in Bosnia and Hezegovina, Croatia and Slovenia, whereas in Serbia, Montenegro, Macedonia and Kosovo the Islamic Religious life was organized by the Supreme Mufti (that was in a lower position than the Grand Mufti), whose office was in Belgrade.

After the creation of the Kingdom of Yugoslavia, the competences of the Supreme Mufti were transferred to the Ulama Majlis in Skopje and the competences of the Grand Mufti were transferred to the Ulama Majlis in Sarajevo. The newly formed Ulama Majlises formed the Rijaset of Islamic Community with its head office in Sarajevo. After the Second World War the Islamic Community of Macedonia became part of the Islamic Community of Yugoslavia (Rijaset), with its office in Sarajevo. Following the breakup of Yugoslavia and the subsequent independence of Macedonia, this community continued to act as an independent religious community in North Macedonia, based in Skopje.

=== Arabati Baba controversy ===
In 2002, a group of armed members of the Islamic Community of Macedonia invaded the Shiʻi Bektashi Order's Arabati Baba Tekke in an attempt to claim the Shia tekke as a mosque for their followers, although the facility has never functioned as such. Subsequently, the Bektashi Order of Macedonia has sued the Macedonian government for failing to defend and later, to restore the tekke to the Bektashi community, pursuant to a law passed in the early 1990s returning property previously nationalized under the Yugoslav government. The law, however, deals with restitution to private citizens, rather than religious communities. The ICM claim to the tekke is based upon their contention to represent all Muslims in Macedonia; and indeed, they are one of two Muslim organizations recognized by the government, both Sunni. The Bektashi Order filed for recognition as a separate religious community with the Macedonian government in 1993, but the Macedonian government has refused to recognize them.

In March 2008, there were reports that the ICM members squatting on the facility grounds have taken control of additional buildings, have been intimidating visitors to the tekke, and have discharged their weapons on the grounds.

=== Modern period ===
On 26 November 2019, an earthquake struck Albania. The Islamic Religious Community of North Macedonia organised a fundraising effort for victims on 29 November after Friday prayers across all its mosques within North Macedonia.

== Structure ==
Map of the muftiships of North Macedonia

Islamic Religious Community of North Macedonia is divided into 13 muftiships:

- Muftiship of Skopje
- Muftiship of Tetovo
- Muftiship of Gostivar
- Muftiship of Kumanovo
- Muftiship of Kičevo
- Muftiship of Debar
- Muftiship of Struga
- Muftiship of Štip
- Muftiship of Bitola
- Muftiship of Veles
- Muftiship of Ohrid
- Muftiship of Prilep
- Muftiship of Resen

== See also ==
- Islam in North Macedonia
