= Lipkovo Municipality =

Municipality of North Macedonia

Coordinates: 42.16°N 21.57°E

Municipality of Lipkovo Општина Липково Komuna e Likovës
- Rural municipality
- Flag Seal

- Country: North Macedonia
- Region: Northeastern
- Municipal seat: Lipkovo

Government
  - Mayor: Erkan Arifi (DUI)

Area
  - Total: 267.82 km^{2} (103.41 sq mi)

Population
  - Total: 22,308
  - Density: 101.03/km^{2} (261.7/sq mi)
- Time zone: UTC+1 (CET)
- Postal code: 1307
- Area code: 037
- Vehicle registration: KU
- ISO 3166-2: MK-48
- Website: Official Website

Lipkovo (Macedonian: Липково, Albanian: Likovë) is a municipality in the north part of North Macedonia. Lipkovo is also the name of the village where the municipal seat is found. Lipkovo Municipality is part of the Northeastern Statistical Region.

== Geography ==
The municipality borders Serbia and Kosovo to the north, Čučer-Sandevo Municipality to the west, the City of Skopje to the southwest, Aračinovo Municipality to the south and Kumanovo Municipality to the east.

== Demographics ==
According to the 2021 North Macedonia census, Lipkovo Municipality has 22,308 inhabitants. Ethnic groups in the municipality:

	2002		2021	
	Number	%	Number	%
TOTAL	27,058	100	22,308	100
Albanians	26,360	97.42	21,560	96.65
Macedonians	169	0.62	33	0.15
Serbs	370	1.37	4	0.01
Bosniaks	6	0.02	4	0.01
Turks			1	0.004
Vlachs	1	0.004		
Other / Undeclared / Unknown	152	0.566	5	0.024
Persons for whom data are taken from administrative sources			701	3.14

Demographics of Lipkovo Municipality
Census year	Population
1994	24,351
2002	27,058
2021	22,308

== Timeline of Lipkovo Municipality ==
=== Installation of Municipality ===
- 1996 Municipality inaugurated

=== 21st century ===
- 2000 Usamedin Alili elected Mayor
- 2001 Insurgency in the Republic of Macedonia
  - Operation MH - 2, Operation Vaksince, Kumanovo Water Crisis 2001, Operation Essential Harvest, Battle of Matejče, Battle of Slupčane
- 2002 Population: 27,058
- 2005 Bekjir Sakipi elected Mayor
- 2008 Northeastern Statistical Region formed
- 2009 Sadula Duraki elected Mayor
- 2011 Ismet Jashari monument built in Ropaljce
- 2012 Hospital built
- 2013 Sadula Duraki elected Mayor 2nd term
- 2015 Gošince attack

== People ==
- Ismet Jashari, from Orizari KLA fighter, KIA in Kosovo

== Culture ==
- Matejče Monastery
- Halit Efendi Mosque
- Jusuf Efendi Mosque
