= North Macedonia–Serbia border =

The North Macedonia–Serbia border separates the Republic of North Macedonia and Serbia in Southeast Europe. It has a length of 102 km (63 mi), or 283 km (176 mi) if you include the border between Kosovo and North Macedonia.

Depending on the definition, the border starts either from the tripoint with Albania in the Bjeshka e Kokës mountains, or at the tripoint Kosovo-Serbia-North Macedonia near Preševo and then continues eastward until it reaches the tripoint with Bulgaria at Žeravino.

== Border crossings ==
There are currently three functioning border crossings between the two countries, two of which are open to motor vehicles. The following is a table of the crossing points, listed from West to East:

(North Macedonia) Macedonian checkpoint	Municipality	(Serbia) Serbian checkpoint	District	Route in North Macedonia	Route in Serbia	Status
Lojane	Lipkovo	Miratovac	Pčinja	local road	local road	CLOSED
Tabanovce	Kumanovo	Preševo	Pčinja			Open
Tatarinovac	Staro Nagoričane	Slavujevac	Pčinja	local road	local road	CLOSED
Pelince	Staro Nagoričane	Prohor Pčinjski	Pčinja	R-1207	M-233	Open
Ogut	Kriva Palanka	Lesnica	Pčinja	R-2245	M-235	CLOSED
Golema Crcorija	Kriva Palanka	Goleš	Pčinja	R-2250	M-444	Open - only pedestrians

The crossings at Brodec/Restelica, Jažince/Globočica, Blace/Elez Han and Belanovce/Stančić are controlled by the Republic of Kosovo.
