= Rankovce =

Rankovce may refer to:

- Rankovce Municipality - a municipality in North Macedonia
- Rankovce, North Macedonia - a town in North Macedonia
- Rankovce, Slovakia - a village and municipality in Slovakia
