= Ginovci =

Ginovci Гиновци
- Village
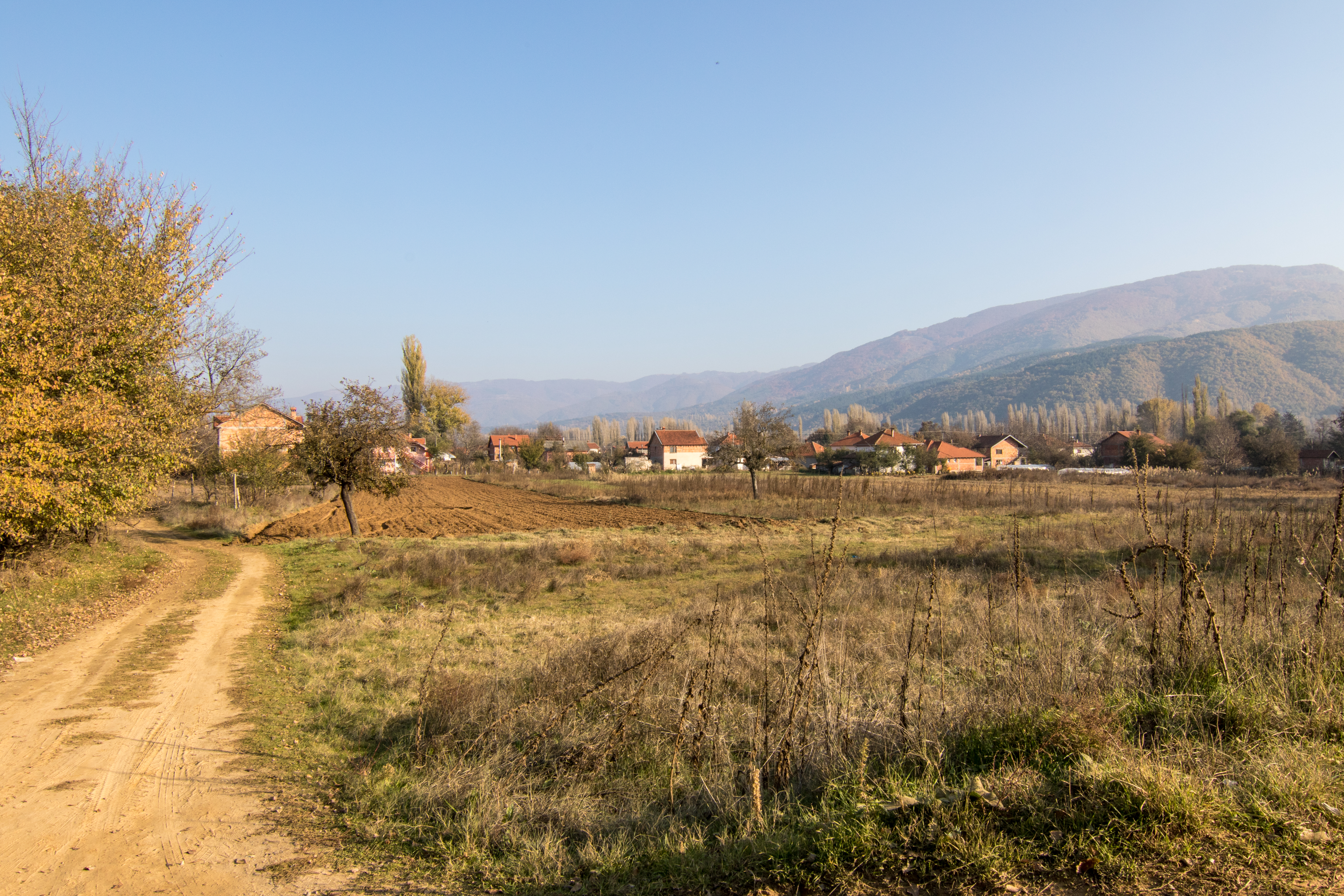
- View of the village

- Location within North Macedonia
- Coordinates: 42.172928°N 22.170057°E
- Country: North Macedonia
- Region: Northeastern
- Municipality: Rankovce

Population (2021)
  - Total: 312
- Time zone: UTC+1 (CET)
  - Summer (DST): UTC+2 (CEST)
- Website: .

Ginovci (Macedonian: Гиновци) is a village in the municipality of Rankovce, North Macedonia.

== Name ==
The name is derived from the Albanian name Gjin.

== Demographics ==
As of the 2021 census, Ginovci had 312 residents with the following ethnic composition:

- Macedonians 293
- Persons for whom data are taken from administrative sources 19

According to the 2002 census, the village had a total of 315 inhabitants. Ethnic groups in the village include:

- Macedonians 308
- Serbs 2
- Romani 4
- Others 1
