= Otošnica =

Otošnica Отошница
- Village
- Location within North Macedonia
- Coordinates: 42.185948°N 22.106707°E
- Country: North Macedonia
- Region: Northeastern
- Municipality: Rankovce

Population (2002)
  - Total: 105
- Time zone: UTC+1 (CET)
  - Summer (DST): UTC+2 (CEST)
- Website: .

Otošnica (Macedonian: Отошница) is a village in the municipality of Rankovce, North Macedonia.

== Demographics ==
According to the 2002 census, the village had a total of 105 inhabitants. Ethnic groups in the village include:

- Macedonians 105
