= Paskačić noble family =

Serbian noble family

Paskačić Паскачић
- Country: Serbian Empire; Lordship of Prilep
- Founded: before 1355
- Titles: kefalija (Head) sevastokrator
- Estates: Slavište župa (from (Serbia) Vranje to (North Macedonia) Kriva Palanka)
- Dissolution: 1395

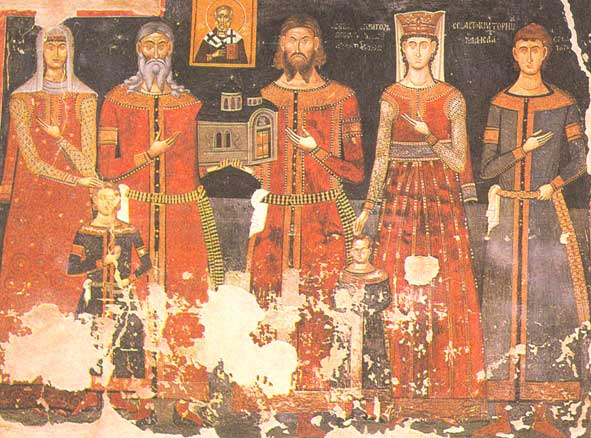
Paskač with his family, monastery Psača near Kriva Palanka, North Macedonia. Dated middle of the 14th century.

The Paskačić family (Serbian Cyrillic: Паскачић, pl. Paskačići / Паскачићи) was a Serbian noble family that served the Serbian Empire, of Dušan the Mighty (r. 1331-1355) and Uroš the Weak (r. 1355-1371), then the Mrnjavčević family' as Lords of Prilep (1371–1395) during the Fall of the Serbian Empire.

== History ==
The eponymous founder was kefalija Paskač, and the family base was in Slavište (modern North Macedonia) and they held the modern border region between Serbia and the latter. Paskač had a son, Vlatko Paskačić, (hence, the family is also known as Vlatković (Serbian Cyrillic: Влатковић, pl. Vlatkovići / Влатковићи)) who received the title of sevastokrator in 1365, when Vukašin Mrnjavčević was declared co-ruler as King of Serbs and Greeks. He was also instrumental in the Battle of Tripolje, where his information on Branković and Ottoman troops' movement provided to the ascendant despot Stefan Lazarević, brought him victory. After this, Uglješa ruled as Stefan's subject well into 1400s.

== Family ==
- knez Paskač, married Ozra
  - sevastokrator Vlatko, married Vladislava
    - Stefan
    - kesar Uglješa Vlatković (fl. 1371 - after 1427)
      - Stefan (d. ca. 1400)
    - son (possibly Uroš)
