= Martinica, Kriva Palanka =

Martinica Мартиница
- Village
- Location within North Macedonia
- Coordinates: 42.178823°N 22.334091°E
- Country: North Macedonia
- Region: Northeastern
- Municipality: Kriva Palanka

Population (2002)
  - Total: 157
- Time zone: UTC+1 (CET)
  - Summer (DST): UTC+2 (CEST)
- Website: .

Martinica (Macedonian: Мартиница) is a village in the municipality of Kriva Palanka, North Macedonia.

== Demographics ==
According to the 2002 census, the village had a total of 157 inhabitants. Ethnic groups in the village include:

- Macedonians 157
