= Trnovo, Kriva Palanka =

Trnovo Трново
- Village
- Location within North Macedonia
- Coordinates: 42.282627°N 22.370911°E
- Country: North Macedonia
- Region: Northeastern
- Municipality: Kriva Palanka

Population (2002)
  - Total: 153
- Time zone: UTC+1 (CET)
  - Summer (DST): UTC+2 (CEST)
- Website: .

Trnovo (Macedonian: Трново) is a village in the municipality of Kriva Palanka, North Macedonia.

== Demographics ==
According to the 2002 census, the village had a total of 153 inhabitants. Ethnic groups in the village include:

- Macedonians 153
