= Radibuš =

Radibuš Радибуш
- Village
- Location within North Macedonia
- Coordinates: 42.200272°N 22.109335°E
- Country: North Macedonia
- Region: Northeastern
- Municipality: Rankovce

Population (2002)
  - Total: 157
- Time zone: UTC+1 (CET)
  - Summer (DST): UTC+2 (CEST)
- Website: .

Radibuš (Macedonian: Радибуш) is a village in the municipality of Rankovce, North Macedonia.

== History ==
Radibuš contains three archaeological sites within its boundaries, all dating for Late Antiquity.

In 1846, a teacher in Radibuš, Gjorgija Makedonski, wrote referring to his family that "we are Macedonians, but not Greeks" and that "we are Slavs from Macedonia".

== Demographics ==
According to the 2002 census, the village had a total of 157 inhabitants. Ethnic groups in the village include:

- Macedonians 156
- Others 1
