= German, North Macedonia =

German Герман
- Village
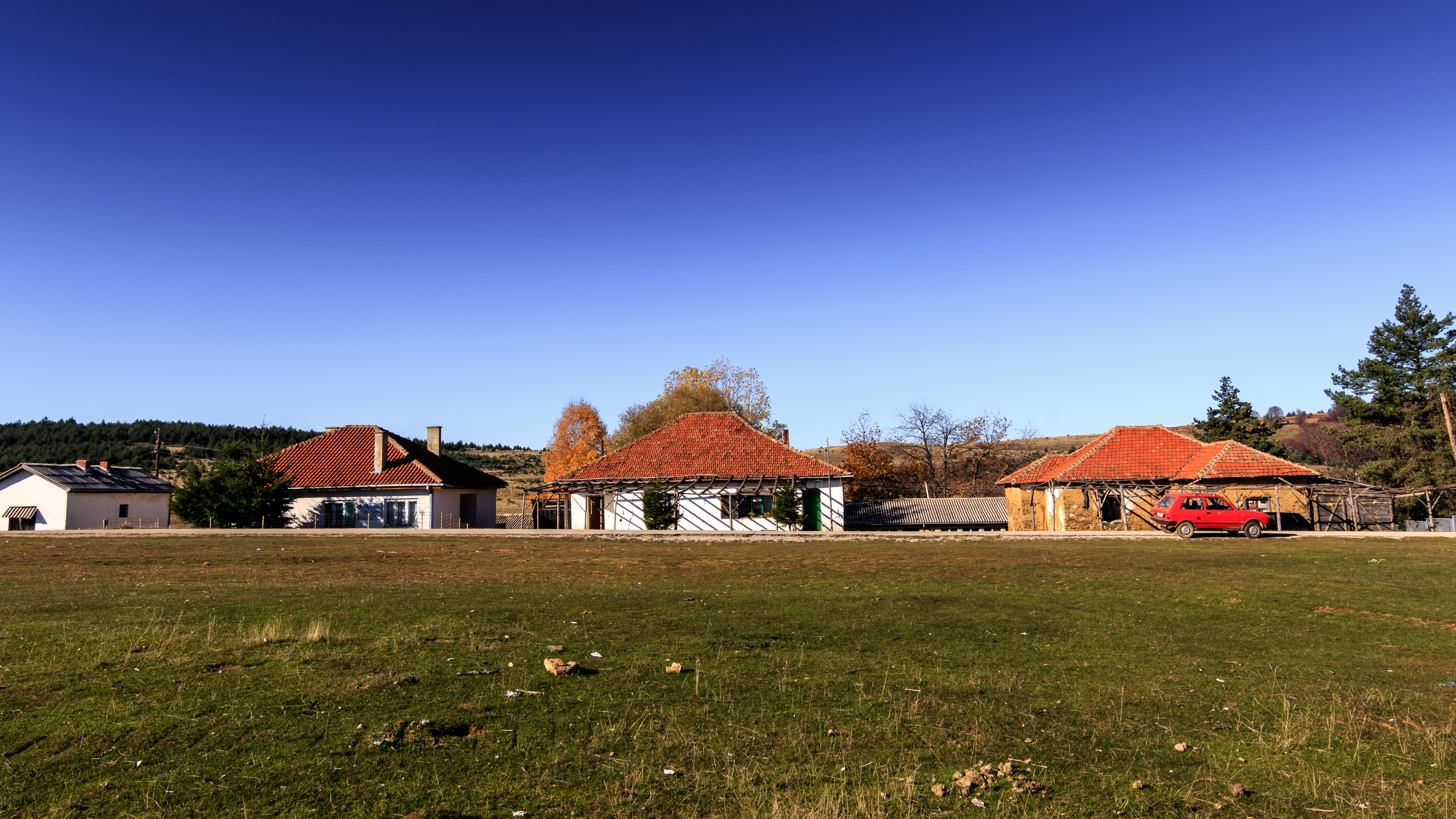
- View of the village

- Location within North Macedonia
- Coordinates: 42.274965°N 22.104264°E
- Country: North Macedonia
- Region: Northeastern
- Municipality: Rankovce

Population (2002)
  - Total: 311
- Time zone: UTC+1 (CET)
  - Summer (DST): UTC+2 (CEST)
- Website: .

German (Macedonian: Герман) is a village in the municipality of Rankovce, North Macedonia.

== Demographics ==
According to the 2002 census, the village had a total of 311 inhabitants. Ethnic groups in the village include:

- Macedonians 301
- Serbs 10
