= Moždivnjak =

Moždivnjak Мождивњак
- Village
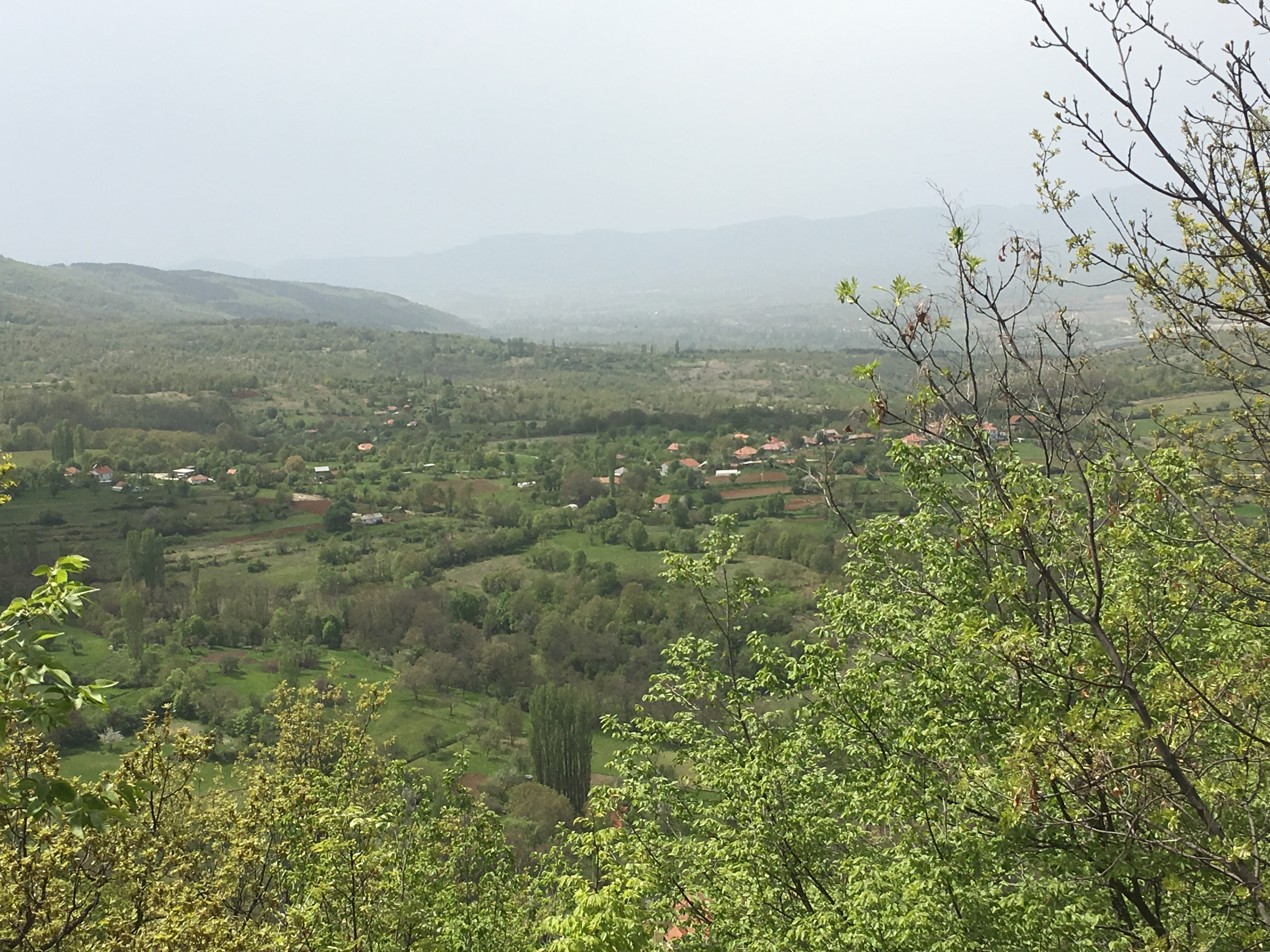
- View of the village

- Location within North Macedonia
- Coordinates: 42.159798°N 22.245764°E
- Country: North Macedonia
- Region: Northeastern
- Municipality: Kriva Palanka

Population (2002)
  - Total: 770
- Time zone: UTC+1 (CET)
  - Summer (DST): UTC+2 (CEST)
- Website: .

Moždivnjak (Macedonian: Мождивњак) is a village in the municipality of Kriva Palanka, North Macedonia.

== Demographics ==
According to the 2002 census, the village had a total of 770 inhabitants. Ethnic groups in the village include:

- Macedonians 769
- Other 1
