= Rankovce, North Macedonia =

Rankovce Ранковце
- Village
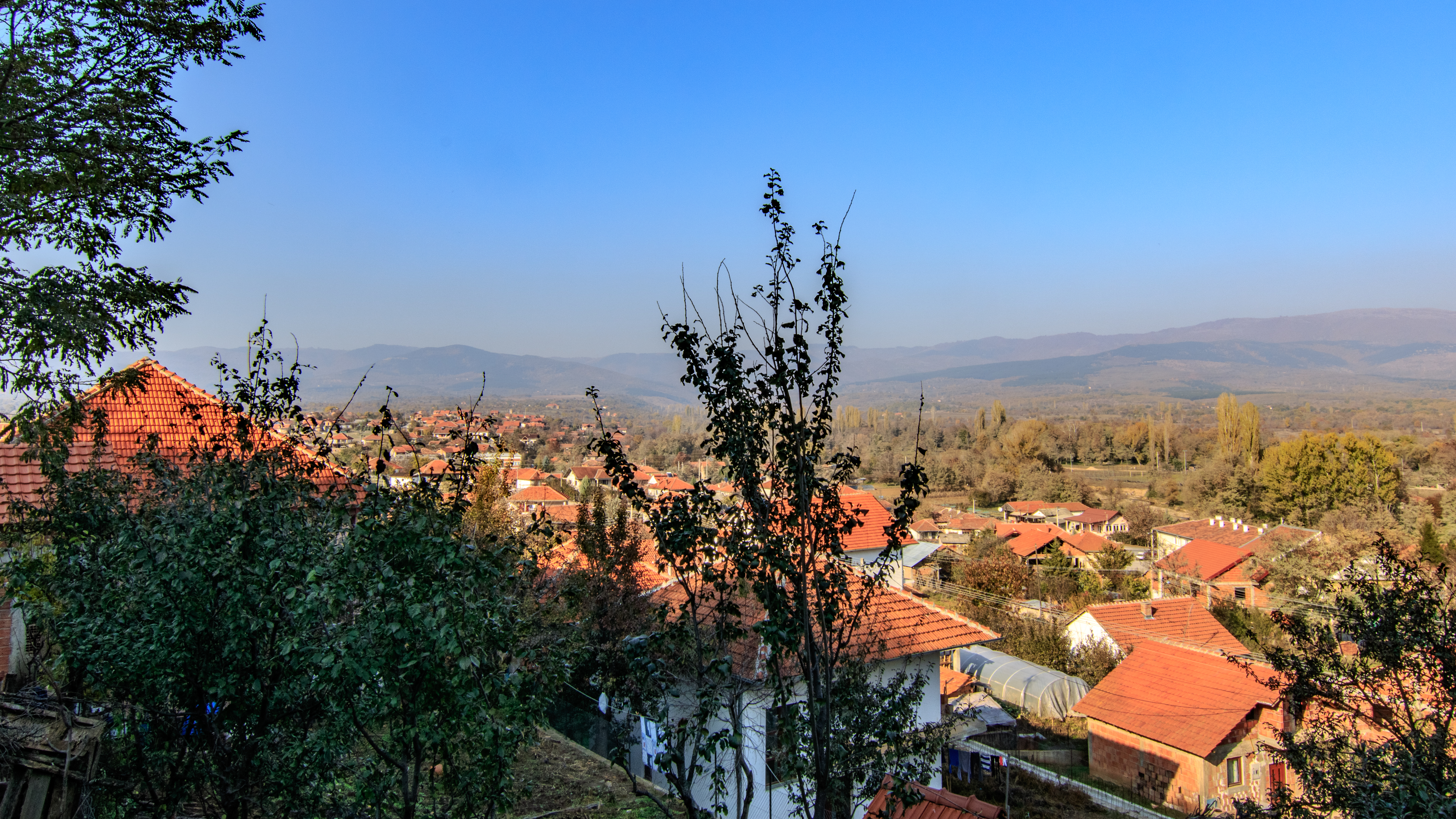
- Panoramic view of the village Rankovce

- Location within North Macedonia
- Country: North Macedonia
- Region: Northeastern
- Municipality: Rankovce

Population (2021)
  - Total: 1,337
- Time zone: UTC+1 (CET)
  - Summer (DST): UTC+2 (CEST)
- Vehicle registration: KP
- Website: .

Rankovce (Macedonian: Ранковце) is a village in North Macedonia. It is a seat of the Rankovce municipality which covers an area of Slavishko field that belongs to the famous region of Kriva Reka.

== Demographics ==
As of the 2021 census, Rankovce had 1,337 residents with the following ethnic composition:

- Macedonians 1,113
- Roma 137
- Persons for whom data are taken from administrative sources 78
- Others 9

According to the 2002 census, the village had a total of 1,192 inhabitants. Ethnic groups in the village include:

- Macedonians 1,133
- Serbs 1
- Romani 53
- Others 5
