= Psača, Rankovce =

Psača Псача
- Village
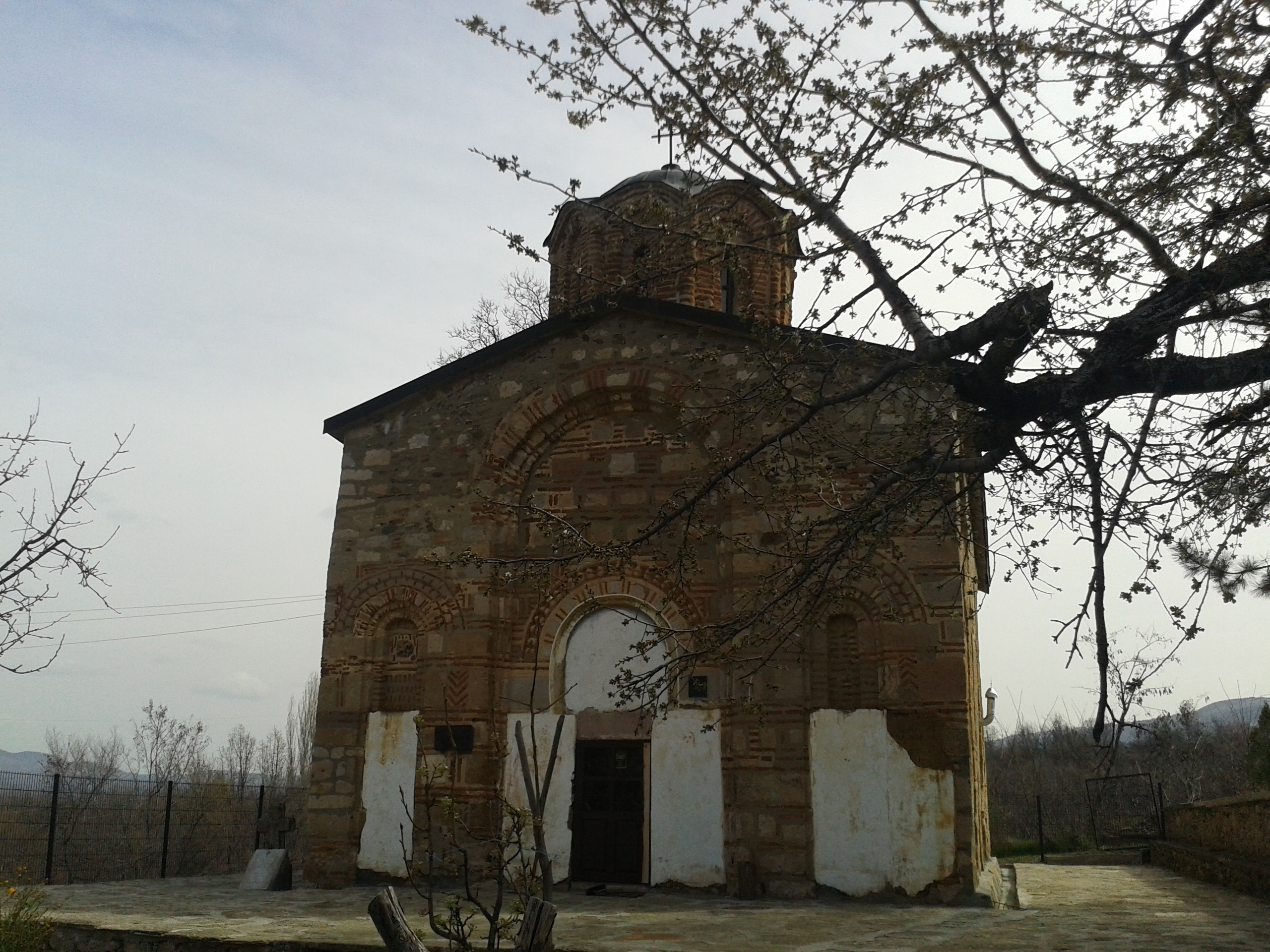
- St Nicholas Church

- Location within North Macedonia
- Coordinates: 42.168170°N 22.202231°E
- Country: North Macedonia
- Region: Northeastern
- Municipality: Rankovce

Population (2002)
  - Total: 539
- Time zone: UTC+1 (CET)
  - Summer (DST): UTC+2 (CEST)
- Website: .

Psača (Macedonian: Псача) is a village in the municipality of Rankovce, North Macedonia. It is home of the Psača Monastery.

== Demographics ==
According to the 2002 census, the village had a total of 539 inhabitants. Ethnic groups in the village include:

- Macedonians 538
- Others 1
