= Odreno =

Odreno Одрено
- Village
- Location within North Macedonia
- Coordinates: 42.161531°N 22.137857°E
- Country: North Macedonia
- Region: Northeastern
- Municipality: Rankovce

Population (2002)
  - Total: 131
- Time zone: UTC+1 (CET)
  - Summer (DST): UTC+2 (CEST)
- Website: .

Odreno (Macedonian: Одрено) is a village in the municipality of Rankovce, North Macedonia.

== Demographics ==
According to the 2002 census, the village had a total of 131 inhabitants. Ethnic groups in the village include:

- Macedonians 130
- Others 1
