= Podrži Konj =

Podrži Konj Подржи Коњ
- Village
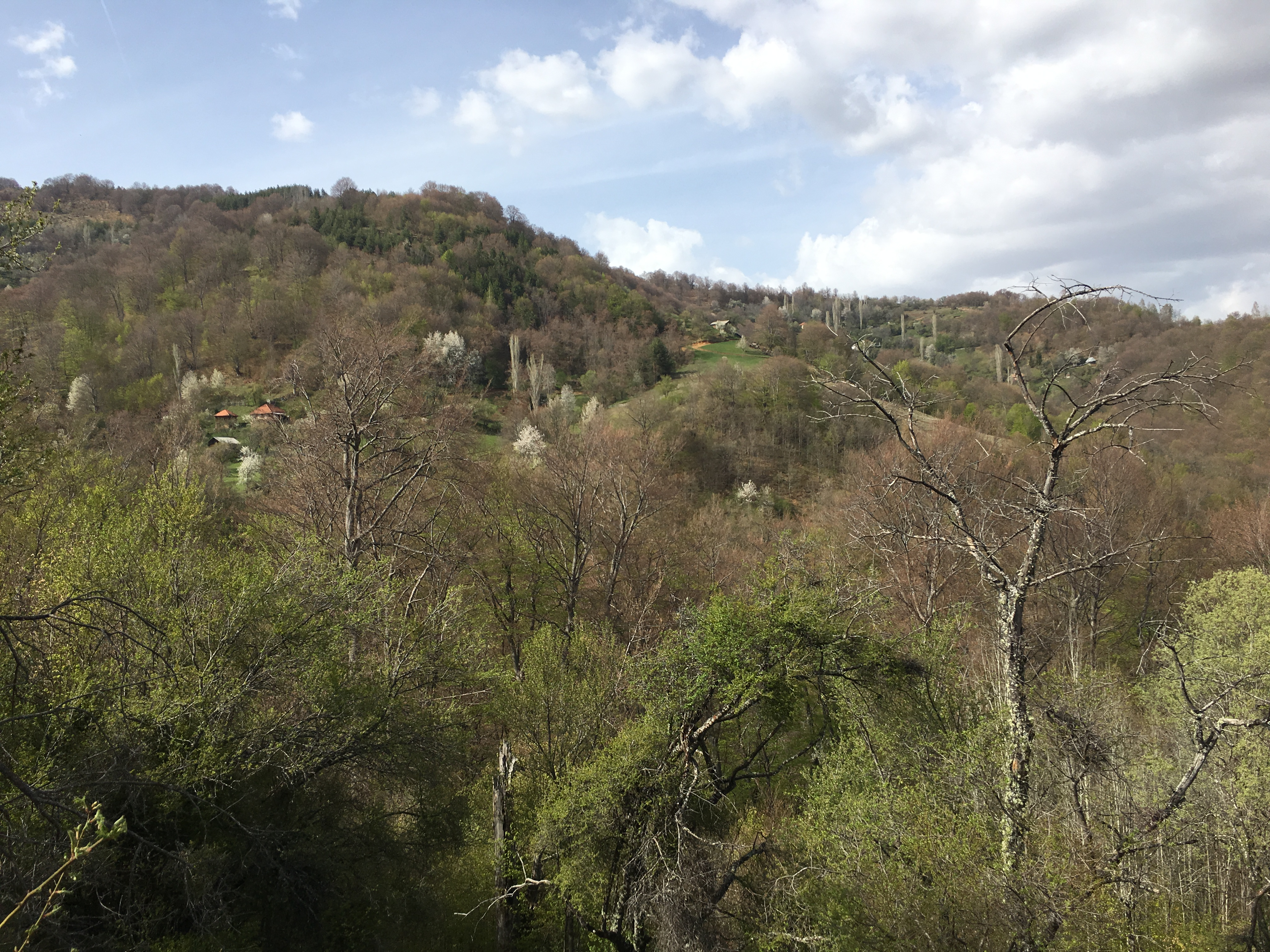
- View of the village

- Location within North Macedonia
- Coordinates: 42.305266°N 22.272795°E
- Country: North Macedonia
- Region: Northeastern
- Municipality: Kriva Palanka

Population (2002)
  - Total: 116
- Time zone: UTC+1 (CET)
  - Summer (DST): UTC+2 (CEST)
- Website: .

Podrži Konj (Macedonian: Подржи Коњ) is a village in the municipality of Kriva Palanka, North Macedonia.

== Demographics ==
According to the 2002 census, the village had a total of 116 inhabitants. Ethnic groups in the village include:

- Macedonians 114
- Serbs 2
