= Ljubinci =

Ljubinci may refer to:

- Ljubinci, Rankovce, North Macedonia
- Ljubinci (Aleksandrovac), Serbia
