= Petralica =

Petralica Петралица
- Village
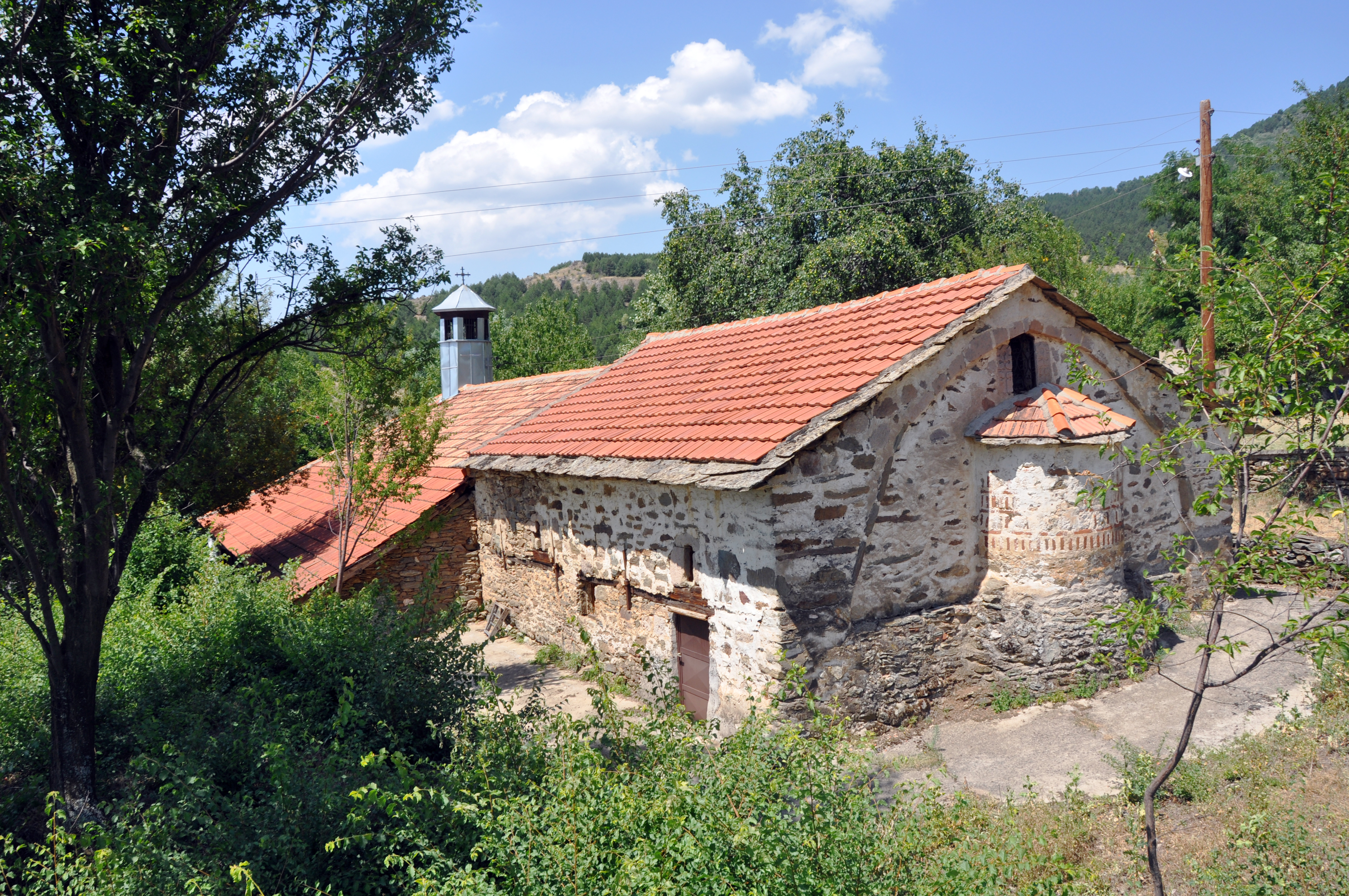
- St. George's Church

- Location within North Macedonia
- Coordinates: 42.211753°N 22.179401°E
- Country: North Macedonia
- Region: Northeastern
- Municipality: Rankovce

Population (2002)
  - Total: 669
- Time zone: UTC+1 (CET)
  - Summer (DST): UTC+2 (CEST)
- Website: .

Petralica (Macedonian: Петралица) is a village in the municipality of Rankovce, North Macedonia.

== Demographics ==
According to the 2002 census, the village had a total of 669 inhabitants. Ethnic groups in the village include:

- Macedonians 667
- Serbs 1
- Others 1
