= Katlanovo =

Village near Skopje, North Macedonia

Katlanovo Катланово Katllanovë
- Village
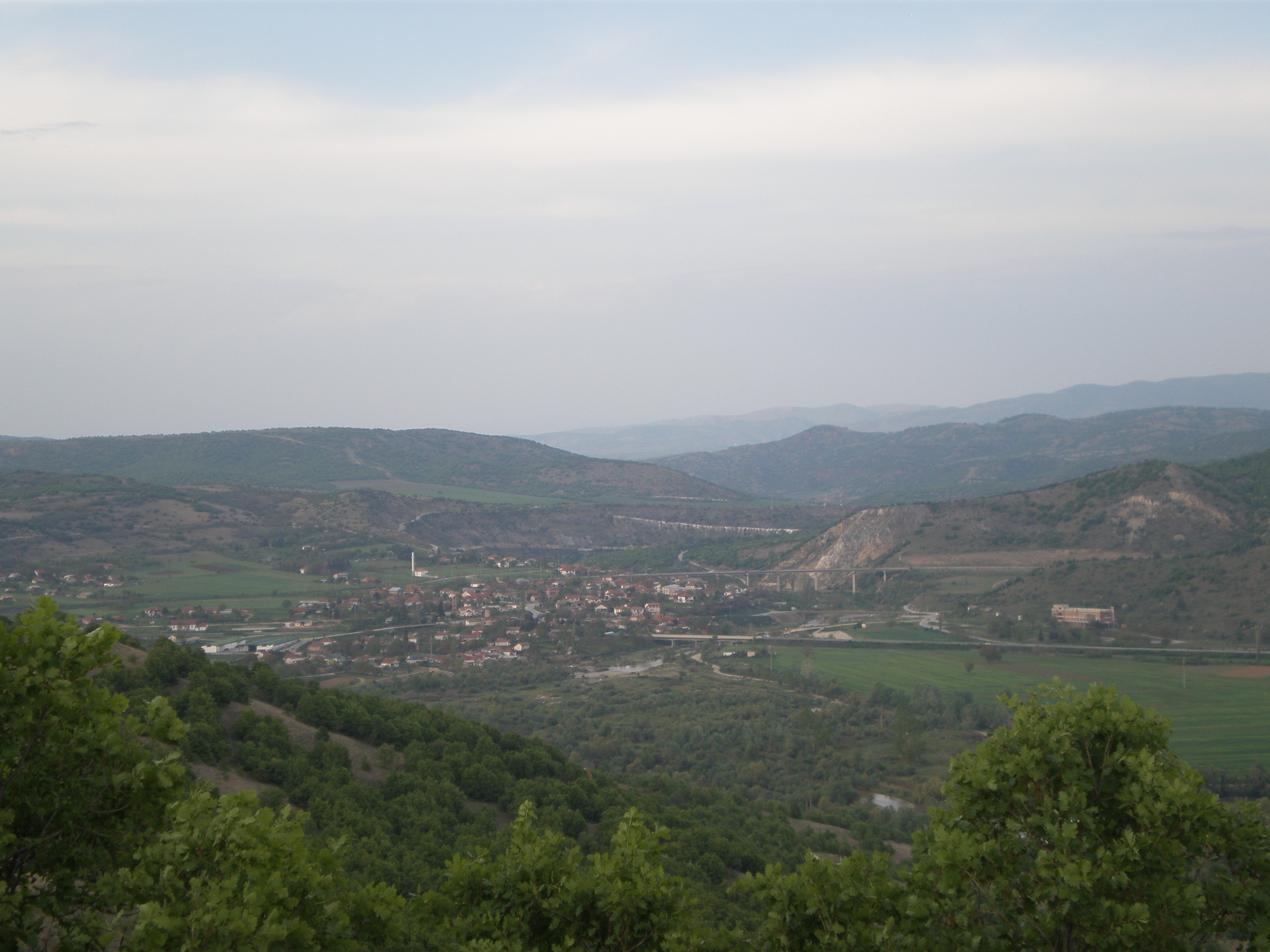
- View of the village

- Location within North Macedonia
- Coordinates: 41°54′N 21°41′E
- Country: North Macedonia
- Region: Skopje
- Municipality: Petrovec

Area
  - Total: 15.6 km^{2} (6.0 sq mi)
- Elevation: 240 m (790 ft)

Population (2021)
  - Total: 839
  - Density: 53.8/km^{2} (139/sq mi)
- Time zone: UTC+1 (CET)
  - Summer (DST): UTC+2 (CEST)
- Car plates: SK

Katlanovo (Macedonian: Катланово, Albanian: Katllanovë) is a village in the Petrovec Municipality, North Macedonia. It is located in the southern part of the Skopje Valley. In 2021, the village had a population of 839.

== History ==
Vasil Kanchov's 1900 survey recorded 70 Christian Bulgarians and 20 Turks. Later, in 1905, Secretary of the Bulgarian Exarchate, Dimitar Mishev (writing as "Brancoff"), documented 80 Exarchist Bulgarians.

According to a list published by the Ministry of Interior of Bulgaria in 1917, the village was part of the then-Katlanovo Municipality and had a population of 140.

== Geography ==
This medium-sized village with an area of 15.6 square kilometers is situated in the southern part of the Skopje Valley near the valley of the river Pčinja, 27 kilometers away from Skopje. It is also located near the road Skopje-Veles-Gevgelija. It is a planar village with an elevation of 240 meters.

== Demographics ==
=== Ethnic groups ===
The historical ethnic makeup of this village is as follows: (Note: In 1948, the population was 623, with no recorded ethnic composition.)

Ethnicity	Year							
Ethnicity	1953	1961	1971	1981	1991	1994	2002	2021
Macedonians	471	507	434	428	449	433	418	443
Albanians	95	174	105	198	217	230	275	183
Turks	4	8	68	10	8	14	0	2
Roma	49	—	32	70	68	65	63	20
Aromanians	0	—	—	0	0	0	0	—
Serbs	29	27	18	15	8	14	5	17
Bosniaks	—	—	—	—	—	—	0	2
Others	2	46	108	90	39	10	8	6
Total	650	762	765	811	789	766	769	839 (Note: There are 166 "persons for whom the data has been obtained from administrative sources".)

=== Sex distribution ===
The historical population of both sexes in this village is as follows:

Sex		Year						
Sex	1948	1953	1961	1971	1981	1991	1994	2002
Male	316	337	400	404	425	420	396	392
Female	307	313	362	361	386	369	370	377
