= Stanci =

Stanci may refer to:

- Stanci (Kruševac), a village in Serbia
- Stanci (Aleksinac), a village in Serbia
- Stanci, Kriva Palanka, a village in North Macedonia
