= Rankovce Municipality =

Municipality of North Macedonia

Coordinates: 42°11′N 22°06′E

Municipality of Rankovce Општина Ранковце
- Rural municipality
- Flag Coat of arms

- Country: North Macedonia
- Region: Northeastern
- Municipal seat: Rankovce

Government
  - Mayor: Borče Spasovski (VMRO-DPMNE)

Area
  - Total: 240.71 km^{2} (92.94 sq mi)

Population
  - Total: 3,465
  - Density: 17.22/km^{2} (44.6/sq mi)
- Time zone: UTC+1 (CET)
- Postal code: 1316
- Vehicle registration: KP

Rankovce (Macedonian: Ранковце) is a municipality in the northeastern region of the Republic of North Macedonia. Rankovce is also the name of the town where the municipal seat is found. Rankovce Municipality is part of the Northeastern statistical region.

== Geography and location ==
Rankovce municipality is located in the northeastern part of North Macedonia. It covers an area of 242 km^{2}.

The municipality borders Serbia to the north, Kriva Palanka Municipality to the east, Kratovo Municipality to the south and Staro Nagoričane Municipality to the west.

It has a significant geostrategic position because it borders Serbia to the north and Bulgaria indirectly, through Kriva Palanka municipality, to the east. An important road passes through it connecting the southern Balkans to Istanbul and Asia Minor, today known as the east–west corridor.

The municipality is connected through the south-west highway with Kumanovo (50 km) and Skopje (80 km). It is 20 km east to Kriva Palanka, 60 km to the Bulgarian border crossing Kjustendil and 25 km south to Kratovo.

It lies on the Slavishko Pole, a large plain that was a former lake in the Pliocene age, and to the north and south is surrounded by mountains. The climate is moderate-continental driven by the mountain ranges and the influence of the Aegean Sea through the river of Kriva Reka. The average temperature is 10.2 °C. Through the year, the warmest month is July with average temperature of 20.0 °C, while the coldest month is January with average temperature of 0.3 °C.

The soil of this area is very heterogeneous. There are many springs, rivers and streams due to the relatively high altitude and soil makeup. The most powerful is the Turanic spring at an altitude of 1,800m. Other notable springs are Carev Vrv (Kriva Reka), Bela Voda and Kalin Kamen.

The whole territory is a drainage-basin for the river Kriva Reka. Other smaller rivers (Kiselichka, Kriljanska and Durachka) pour into the Kriva Reka.

== Cultural and natural sights ==
The municipality has eight churches:

- Church of St Nicholas in Ginovci - dating from the 17th century, restored in the 19th century.
- Church of St Nicholas in Opila - originating from the 13th or 14th century. The church is noted for the entrance stairs, one of the only churches in the region with an elevated entrance.
- Church of St Jovan in Otoshnica - built in the 19th century.
- Church of St George in Petralica - church dating from the 17th century, renovated in the 19th century. The church is noted for the royal gates which are now located in the guest room of the Institute for Protection of Monuments and Culture.
- Monastery of St Nicholas in Psacha - monastery dating from the 14th century and was built by Vlatko Paskačić, a nobleman during the time of King Dusan. The monastery choir is noted for The Bronze Horos which is exhibited in the Museum of Macedonia and is of great historical significance.
- Church of St Paraskeva in Radibush - dating from the 19th century.
- Church of the Virgin in Rankovce - dating from the 19th century.
- Church of the Trinity in German - unknown date of origin.

Some of the natural or tourist sites in the municipality include:

- Ezerce, a picnic site in the village of Petralica popular with tourists in the summer. It has a pond, traditional restaurant and is surrounded by forest.
- Dam Otoshnica - a dam with a picnic spot by the reservoir.
- Gogomont, a picnic site in the village of Rankovce popular with tourists in the summer. It has a pond, traditional restaurant and is surrounded by forest.
- Park, a picnic site in the village of Ginovci popular with tourists in the summer. It has a pond, traditional restaurant and is surrounded by forest. The complex also has a mini zoo and church for visitors.

== Social institutions ==
The Municipality of Rankovce contains an elementary school, Hristijan Todorovski - Karpos, in the town of Rankovce. The school been open since 1956. It is currently in a renovated school building that opened in 2000. The number of students in this school year is 417 students. The total school staff is 50 employees of which 42 are teachers. The school teaches many subjects including literature, sciences, maths, geography, history, English and Spanish. Students prepare a school newspaper that traditionally comes out once a year in May.

== Inhabited places ==
Inhabited places in Rankovce Municipality
Villages: Baratlija (Баратлија) | Vetunica (Ветуница) | Vržogrnci (Вржогрнци) | German (Герман) | Ginovci (Гиновци) | Gulinci (Гулинци) | Krivi kamen (Криви Камен) | |Ljubinci (Љубинци) | Milutince (Милутинце) | Odreno (Одрено) | Opila (Опила) | Otošnica (Отошница) | P'klište (П'клиште) | Petralica (Петралица) | Psača (Псача) | Radibuš (Радибуш) | Rankovce (Ранковце) | Stanča (Станча)

=== Settlements ===
Baratlija (Баратлија) - specific data is not available for this village because it is considered to be part of Petralica. The village is ritsko mountain - scattered neighborhood type.

Vetunica (Ветуница) - settlement located in the southwest part of the territory of the municipality, on the right side of the Kriva River with a smaller river passing through the village. The village is scattered neighborhood type, populated since late antiquity, it has an archaeological site. The settlement lies directly on the road to Kumanovo The municipality bus station is located about 600 meters from the village center.

Vržogrnci (Вржогрнци) - village is located in the western part of the municipality, its surroundings bordering Kratovo Municipality and Klechovce. The municipal center is 7 km distance from the main road. The settlement is scattered neighborhood type and has been populated since late antiquity, as reflected in the archaeological sites of this period: Blidezh and Lutavchina.

German (Герман) - is located in the northern part of the territory. It is in the area bordering Serbia on one side and the other side the border with the Municipality of Old Nagoricane. This village is at a high altitude and of dispersed type with a municipal center a distance of about 20 km from the road. The village has asphalt local road.

Ginovci (Гиновци) - settlement is located on the southern Slavishko Pole not far from the highway to Kumanovo. The municipal center is 4 km from the road. 500m from the village is the river. The village is on flat ground and it is suitable for agricultural production. The village has 311 residents of whom 304 are Macedonians, 2 declared as Serbs, 4 as Roma and 1 other.

Gulinci (Гулинци) - village is located in the western part of the municipality in the area bounded by the Municipality of Old Nagoricane. The village is of the scattered neighborhood type. From the municipal center it is 7 km to the road.

Krivi kamen (Криви Камен) - village is located on the northern part of the municipality. This mountain village's municipal center is 9 km distance from the road. The villages water is not in good condition and that is one of the reasons for the depopulation of the village. In 1961 there were 237 people living there but now there are only 23 inhabitants (all of the Macedonian Orthodox religion and ethnicity).

Ljubinci (Љубинци) - village is situated on the right side of the river and is flat. The municipal center is 2 km from the main road and the settlement is concentrated on both sides of the road to Kumanovo.

Milutince (Милутинце) - located in central-northern part of the municipality it is of the scattered type. From the municipal center it is 7 km to the road.

Odreno (Одрено) - village located in the southern part of the municipality at the foot of the Osogovski mountains on the left side of the river. There is a small creek Odrenska near the village and it is of the ritsko mountain neighborhood type. The municipal center is 4 km from the road. It is 1 km from a bus station in the village Petralica but the road leading to the village is not fully paved.

Opila (Опила) - settlement is located in the southern part of the municipality one left of the river, a portion of the village extends into plain while the other extends the Osogovski mountains. It is of the ritsko flat type. From the municipal center distance is 1 km from the Kumanovo road.

Otošnica (Отошница) - is located in the western part of the municipality. The area is close to the Staro municipality border. The settlement extends to the foot of Mount Herman and has ritsko mountainous character. The municipal center distance is 5 km from the main road. The village has a paved road but is not associated with a direct bus. The village originated in late antiquity. It has several excavated archaeological sites. It is of scattered neighborhood type.

P'klište (П'клиште) - a mountain village located in the northwestern part of the municipality. The area of the village extends to Old Nagoricane Municipality and the border with neighboring Serbia. The village is located at an altitude of 1150 to 1250m with houses of a scattered type. From the municipal center it is a distance of about 20 km to the main road.

Petralica (Петралица) - The settlement is located on the eastern part of the municipality on the right curve of the river and on the road leading to the Republic of Bulgaria. The village is on a plain ritsko and is of a densely populated neighborhood type. The village has a highway running through it with dense housing and in the higher parts of the village there are more dispersed houses. From the municipal center the main road distance is 5 km. The village has a bus stop with about 12 daily local and regional bus connections. Historical data shows that the village originated from late antiquity and there are several archaeological sites.

Psača (Псача) - settlement is located in the southeast part of the municipality, on the left side of the curve of the river and on the road to Kumanovo. Ritsko village is mountainous with the highest number houses concentrated near the highway and then scattered houses in more remote parts of the village. From the municipal center distance is 8 km to the main road.

Radibuš (Радибуш) - village is located in the central part of the municipality. The village type is mountainous and scattered. From the municipal center distance it is 4 km to the main road. There is a local paved road but no bus connection. In the village according to the last census 157 people live, all of Macedonian ethnic origin and Orthodox religion.

Rankovce (Ранковце) - settlement located in the central part of Slavishko Pole on the right side of the river and on the road that leads Bulgaria. It is the center and seat of the municipality. The village consists of the urban part that is concentrated near the road and some scattered settlements in remote parts of the village. In the village according to the last census there were 1129 living inhabitants of whom 57 are Roma, 2 are Serb, 5 other ethnic groups and the rest Macedonians. There were 18 residents listed as Muslim, 1 of another religion and the rest as Orthodox Christians.

Stanča (Станча) - village located on the northwestern part of the municipality. The municipal center is 18 km from the main road. The village is ritsko mountainous - scattered housing spanning the altitude from 800 to 1020m. It has dirt roads that are not in satisfactory condition especially in winter.

== Government ==
Ivica Toševski an Independent was mayor until October 31, 2021, when new elections took place and Borce Spasovski was elected for VMRO-DPMNE.

=== Mayor ===
Borce Spasovski, a candidate of VMRO-DPMNE was elected mayor for a four-year term in the second round of local elections on October 31, 2021.

=== Council of the Municipality (2021-2025) ===
==== President ====
Aleksandra Stamboliska Jovanovska

==== Members ====
1. Daniel Pavlovski
2. Aneta Cvetkovska
3. Marjan Dodevski
4. Mome Spasovski
5. Goran Mladenovski
6. Darko Spasovski
7. Marina Simonovska
8. Ljube Micevski

== Symbols of the municipality ==
=== Flag ===
The main color of the flag is red. The flag has triangles around the edges that form an ancient Macedonian heraldic braid. In the upper left corner of the flag is the coat of arms.

=== Coat of arms ===
The coat of arms is a shield - it is yellow outlined with a thin black line. In the centre are two bird goddesses that watch over the symbol of a monastery. The birds are said to have discovered the monastery site, named Shtrkovica, in the village of Opila (Опила). The original version can be seen in the form of engraved in stone at the ends of the front wall of the monastery in the village of Psača (Псача).

== Demographics ==
According to the 2021 North Macedonia census, the Rankovce Municipality has 3,465 residents. Ethnic groups in the municipality:

	2002		2021	
	Number	%	Number	%
TOTAL	4,144	100	3,465	100
Macedonians	4,058	97.92	3,055	88.17
Roma	57	1.38	143	4.13
Serbs	18	0.43	14	0.4
Turks			1	0.03
Other / Undeclared / Unknown	11	0.27	5	0.14
Persons for whom data are taken from administrative sources			247	7.13

Demographics of Rankovce Municipality
Census year	Population
1994	4,347
2002	4,144
2021	3,465
