= Ljubinci, Rankovce =

Ljubinci Љубинци
- Village
- Location within North Macedonia
- Coordinates: 42.187623°N 22.138388°E
- Country: North Macedonia
- Region: Northeastern
- Municipality: Rankovce

Population (2002)
  - Total: 164
- Time zone: UTC+1 (CET)
  - Summer (DST): UTC+2 (CEST)
- Website: .

Ljubinci (Macedonian: Љубинци) is a village in the municipality of Rankovce, North Macedonia.

== Demographics ==
According to the 2002 census, the village had a total of 164 inhabitants. Ethnic groups in the village include:

- Macedonians 163
- Others 1
