= Stanci, Kriva Palanka =

Stanci Станци
- Village
- Location within North Macedonia
- Coordinates: 42.175401°N 22.383768°E
- Country: North Macedonia
- Region: Northeastern
- Municipality: Kriva Palanka

Population (2002)
  - Total: 203
- Time zone: UTC+1 (CET)
  - Summer (DST): UTC+2 (CEST)
- Website: .

Stanci (Macedonian: Станци) is a village in the municipality of Kriva Palanka, North Macedonia.

== Demographics ==
According to the 2002 census, the village had a total of 203 inhabitants. Ethnic groups in the village include:

- Macedonians 203
