= Uglješa Vlatković =

Serbian nobleman (c. 1359 – after 1427)

- Kesar
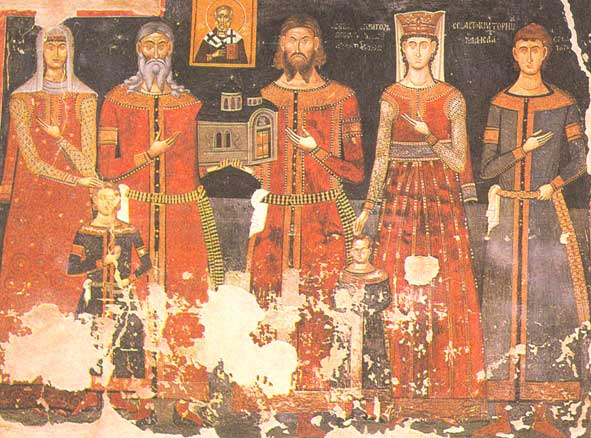
- Possible representation of Uglješa Vlatković as a boy, middle of the 14th century, monastery Psača near Kriva Palanka, North Macedonia
- Predecessor: Vlatko Paskačić
- Full name: Угљеша Влатковић
- Born: c. 1359
- Died: after 1427
- Family: Paskačić
- Issue: Stefan Paskačić (died 1400)

Uglješa Vlatković (Serbian Cyrillic: Угљеша Влатковић) (c. 1359 – after 1427) was a Serbian nobleman. He had the title of kesar (caesar) and ruled over the area of Inogošt (today Surdulica), Preševo and Vranje.

His grandfather Knez Paskač and his father Sevastokrator Vlatko Paskačić (House of Paskačić) were both nobles of Emperor Dušan the Mighty and ruled over the border areas between what are now the countries of the Republic of Serbia and North Macedonia, including Slavište župa. His family built Psača monastery with the church of Saint Nicholas, around 1354. One of the boys portrayed on the fresco could be Uglješa.

Uglješa received the title of caesar when he was a boy from the Emperor Uroš the Weak, and after his father's death most of his lands were usurped by the Dejanović brothers. After the Battle of Rovine in 1395, he probably managed to retake his father's land and became a vassal of the Ottoman Sultan. It is mentioned that at the beginning of the 15th century he gave one church to the Hilandar monastery.

It is not known whether he participated in the Battle of Ankara, but he joined Ottoman forces sent by Süleyman Çelebi. Their goal was to merge with forces of Branković and prevent the return of Stefan Lazarević in Serbia. On 21 November 1402, the Battle of Gračanica took place. Caesar Uglješa, who was the vassal of the Ottomans, knew about their battle plans and informed Stefan Lazarević. At the very beginning of the battle, Vlatković defected to Lazarević's side and contributed considerably to his victory. As a reward for his conduct, Lazarević confirmed his authority over his father's lands and became Stefan's vassal.

Over the years, Vlatković was a faithful vassal of Stefan Lazarević and with his forces participated in the Battle of Kosmidion on 15 June 1410. Byzantine sources mentioned him as part of Lazarević's delegation which went to Constantinople at the Emperor Manuel II's invitation. In 1412, Vlatković's lands were attacked by the forces of Musa Çelebi. Çelebi's forces marched across the Čemernik, sacked Vranje and attacked Novo Brdo, and Vlatković himself barely managed to stay alive.

After Stefan's death, Constantine of Kostenets moved to the court of Uglješa Vlatković and lived there for some time. He had a son Stefan, who died c. 1400 and was buried in Ljubostinja monastery.
