= Pčinja =

Pčinja (pronounced [pt͡ʃîɲa]) may refer to:

- Pčinja District, Serbia
- Pčinja (river), a tributary of the Vardar in Serbia and North Macedonia
- Pčinja, a village in Kumanovo Municipality, North Macedonia
