= Golema Crcorija =

Duračka Reka Голема Црцорија
- Village
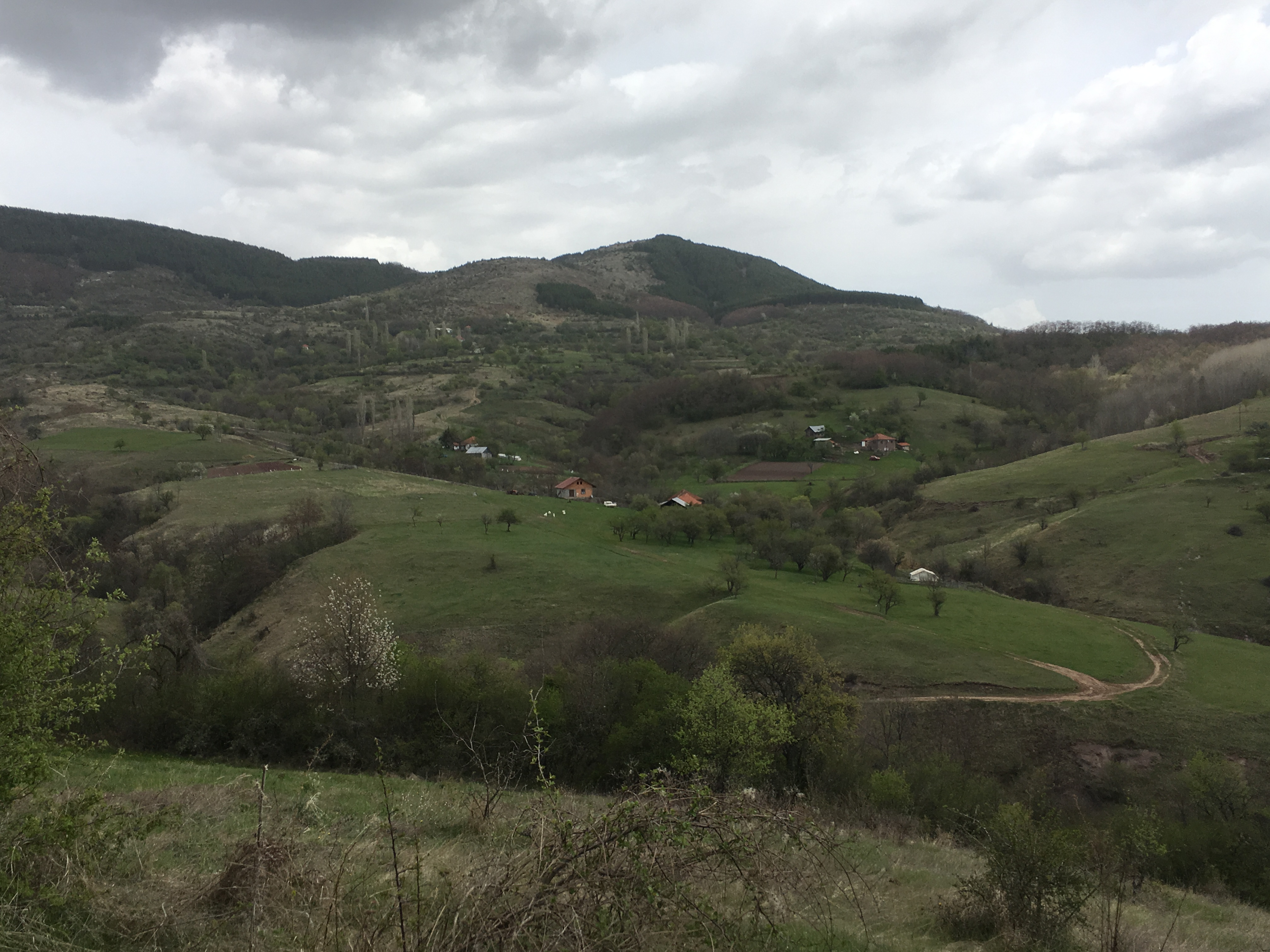

- Location within North Macedonia
- Coordinates: 42°18′39″N 22°19′50″E
- Country: North Macedonia
- Region: Northeastern
- Municipality: Kriva Palanka

Population (2021)
  - Total: 18
- Time zone: UTC+1 (CET)
  - Summer (DST): UTC+2 (CEST)
- Website: .

Golema Crcorija (Macedonian: Голема Црцорија) is a village in the municipality of Kriva Palanka, North Macedonia.

== Demographics ==
According to the 2021 census, the village had a total of 18 inhabitants. Ethnic groups in the village include:

- Macedonians 16
- Albanians 1
- Persons from whom data was taken from administrative sources 1
