= Goles =

Goles, Goleș, or Goleš can refer to:

== People ==
- Eric Goles (born 1951), a Chilean mathematician and computer scientist
- José Goles (1917 – 1993), a Chilean musician
- Mathew Goles (born 1996), a South African cricketer
- Sabrina Goleš (born 1965), a Yugoslav former tennis player

== Places ==
- Goleș, a village in Toplița, Hunedoara County, Romania
- Goleš, Travnik, a village in Bosnia and Herzegovina
- Goleš mine, a magnesite mine in Kosovo Polje, Kosovo

== See also ==
- Golesh, a mountain in Kosovo
- Gole (disambiguation)
- Goals (disambiguation)
