= List of regions of North Macedonia by Human Development Index =

This is a list of the Statistical regions of North Macedonia by Human Development Index as of 2023.

Rank	Province	HDI (2023)
Very high human development
1	Skopje Statistical Region	0.829
2	Pelagonia Statistical Region	0.822
3	Southwestern Statistical Region	0.821
–	North Macedonia (average)	0.815
4	Vardar Statistical Region	0.813
5	Polog Statistical Region	0.806
6	Eastern Statistical Region	0.800
High human development
7	Northeastern Statistical Region	0.795
8	Southeastern Statistical Region	0.773
