= Paskač =

Serbian noble

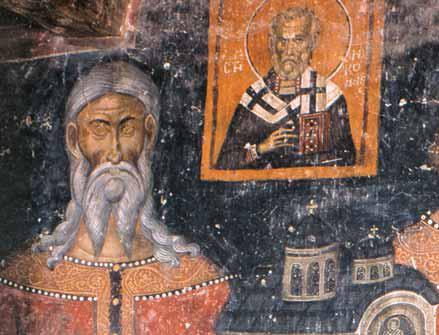
Detail, of Paskač.

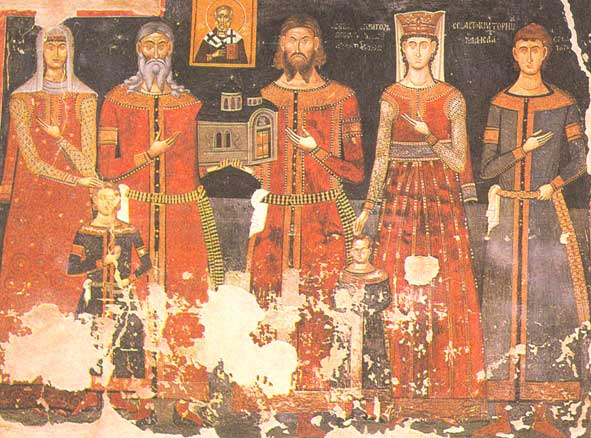
The whole family

The ktetor fresco composition in the Psača Monastery, painted between 1365 and 1371.

Paskač (Serbian: Паскач; fl. 1365) was a Serbian nobleman that served the Serbian Empire, with the title of knez. Together with his son, sevastokrator Vlatko, he founded the Psača Monastery, in which the ktetor fresco of his family (of three generations) has been preserved, painted between 1365 and 1371. He is depicted as an old man, grey-haired, holding the church model together with Vlatko in the centre. By Paskač is his wife, noblewoman Ozra, and also their grandson, Uglješa. The family is wearing rich clothing. Nothing else is known of Paskač; he is not mentioned in donation charters. His function in the state is unknown, and it is unknown in which capacity he received the title of knez. Mandić theorizes that if Paskač was a magnate, he would have succeeded Vojislav as the veliki knez, then Lazar could have received that title after Paskač's death, possibly during the Empire. The fresco composition is valued highly, and is, as other 14th-century works, part of several special studies.

== Annotations ==
1. His name is related to Paskal, Paskoje.

== Sources ==
- Mandić, Svetislav (1986). Velika gospoda sve srpske zemlje i drugi prosopografski prilozi. Srpska književna zadruga. ISBN 9788637900122.
- Blagojević, Miloš; Petković, Sreten (1989). Srbija u doba Nemanjića: od kneževine do carstva : 1168-1371 : ilustrovana hronika. TRZ "VAJAT". ISBN 9788670390287.
- Zograf (1995). Zograf. Vol. 24. Galerija fresaka u Beogradu. pp. 44–46.
- "Portreti iz Psače".
