= Kumanovska Reka =

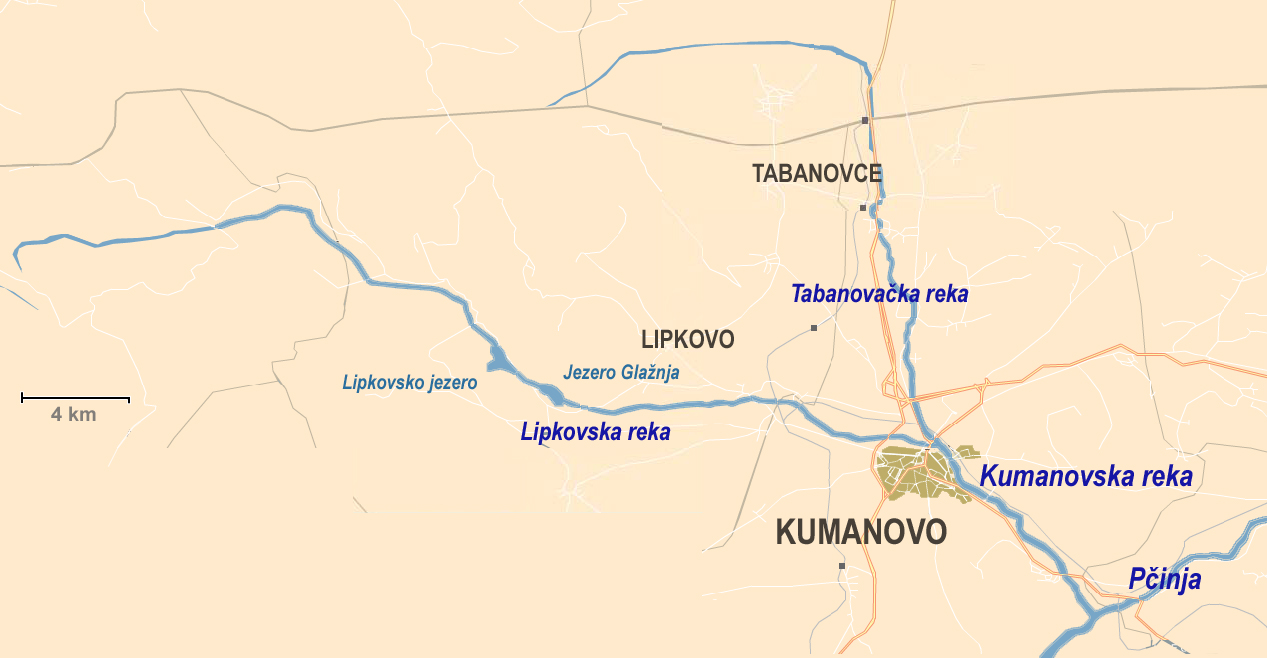
- Map of Kumanovska Reka

Location
- Country: Serbia, North Macedonia

Physical characteristics
- Mouth
  - location: Pčinja
  - coordinates: 42.0824°N 21.7781°E

Basin features
- Progression: Pčinja→ Vardar→ Aegean Sea

The Kumanovska Reka (Macedonian: Кумановска Река, Albanian: Lumi i Kumanovës, "Kumanovo River") is a small river situated in the north-east part of North Macedonia.

It flows mainly through the city of Kumanovo. Its spring is located on the Mountain Skopska Crna Gora. The Kumanovska Reka is a right tributary of river Pčinja.
