= Kriva Palanka Municipality =

Municipality of North Macedonia

Coordinates: 42.22°N 22.33°E

Municipality of Kriva Palanka Општина Крива Паланка
- Urban municipality
- Flag Coat of arms

- Country: North Macedonia
- Region: Northeastern
- Municipal seat: Kriva Palanka

Government
  - Mayor: Saško Mitovski (SDSM)

Area
  - Total: 480.81 km^{2} (185.64 sq mi)

Population
  - Total: 18,059
  - Density: 27.81/km^{2} (72.0/sq mi)
- Time zone: UTC+1 (CET)
- Postal code: 1330
- Area code: 031
- Vehicle registration: KP
- Website: http://www.KrivaPalanka.gov.mk

The Kriva Palanka Municipality (Macedonian: Општина Крива Паланка [ˌkriːva ˈpalaŋka] ) is in the northeastern part of North Macedonia. Kriva Palanka is the town where the municipal seat is located. The municipality is part of the Northeastern Statistical Region.

== Geography ==
The municipality borders Serbia to the north, Bulgaria to the east, the Rankovce Municipality to the west, and the Makedonska Kamenica, Kratovo and Kočani Municipalities to the south.

== Demographics ==
According to the 2021 North Macedonia census, the Municipality of Kriva Palanka has 18,059 residents. Ethnic groups in the municipality:

	2002		2021	
	Number	%	Number	%
TOTAL	20,820	100	18,059	100
Macedonians	19,998	96.05	16,675	92.34
Roma	668	3.21	447	2.48
Serbs	103	0.49	66	0.37
Albanians			7	0.04
Turks	2	0.01	6	0.03
Vlachs	3	0.011	5	0.02
Bosniaks	2	0.01	2	0.01
Other / Undeclared / Unknown	44	0.219	87	0.48
Persons for whom data are taken from administrative sources			764	4.23

Demographics of the Kriva Palanka Municipality
Census year	Population
1994	20,782
2002	20,820
2021	18,059

== Twin towns – sister cities ==
Kriva Palanka is twinned with:

- Bansko, Bulgaria
- Dupnitsa, Bulgaria
- Lugoj, Romania
- Mława, Poland
- Perechyn, Ukraine
- Svidník, Slovakia
- Vršac, Serbia
- Županja, Croatia

== Inhabited places ==
Inhabited places in the Kriva Palanka Municipality
villages: B's (Б'с) | Baštevo (Баштево) | Borovo (Борово) | Varovište (Варовиште) | Gabar (Габaр) | Golema Crcorija (Голема Црцорија) | Gradec (Градец) | Dlabočica (Длабочица) | Dobrovnica (Добровница) | Drenak (Дренак) | Drene (Дрене) | Duračka Reka (Дурачка река) | Židilovo (Жидилово) | Kiselica (Киселица) | Konopnica (Конопница) | Kostur (Костур) | Košari (Кошари) | Krklja (Крклија) | Krstov Dol (Крстов дол) | Lozanovo (Лозаново) | Luke (Луке) | Mala Crcorija (Мала Црцорија) | Martinica (Мартиница) | Meteževo (Метежево) | Moždivnjak (Мождивњак) | Nerav (Нерав) | Ogut (Огут) | Osiče (Осиче), Podrži Konj (Подржи Коњ) | Stanci (Станци) | T'lminci (Т'лминци) | Trnovo (Трново) | Uzem (Узем)
