= Psača Monastery =

Orthodox monastery in Psača, North Macedonia

Coordinates: 42.1555°N 22.2123°E

- Псача манастир
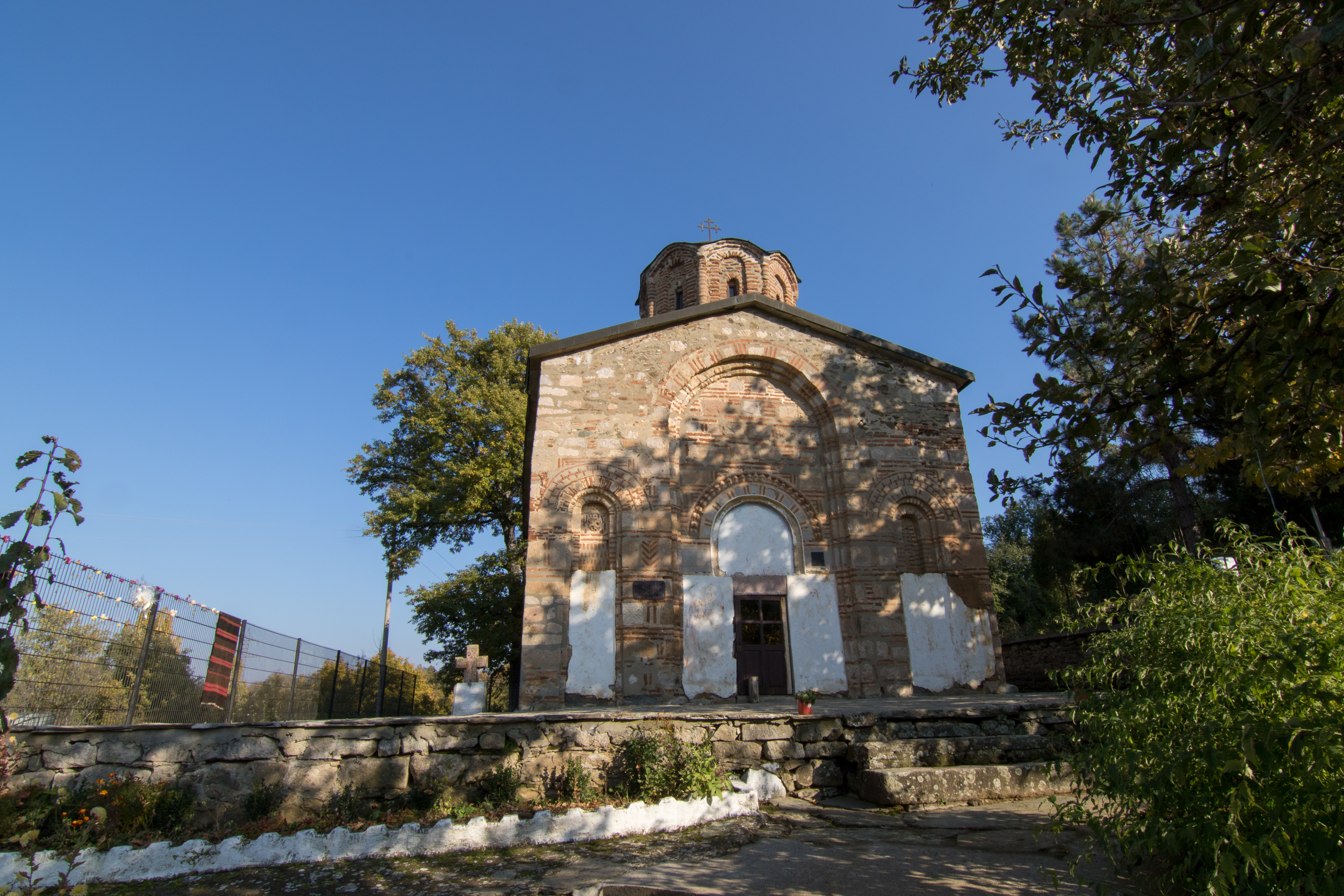
- View of the monastery church

Religion
- Affiliation: Macedonian Orthodox Church
- District: Psača
- Year consecrated: 14th century

Location
- Location: village Psača, Kriva Palanka, North Macedonia
- Interactive map of Psača Monastery

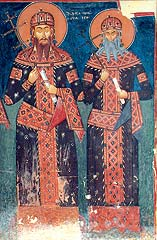
Emperor Uroš and King Vukašin, a fresco from Psača monastery.

Psača Monastery (Macedonian: Псача манастир) is an Eastern Orthodox monastery in the village of Psača, North Macedonia. It was built by the Sebastokrator Vlatko Paskačić and his father Duke Paskač around 1354.

The monastery, dedicated to St Nicholas the Wonderworker, lies at the end of the village of Psača, 3 km from the Kumanovo – Kriva Palanka Road, in Rankovce Municipality. It belongs to the diocese of Osogovo-Kumanovo of the Macedonian Orthodox Church.

== History ==
The monastery church, the only remaining part of the original monastic complex, was erected around 1354 by the Serbian feudal lord Vlatko Paskačić and his father Grand Duke Paskač, nobles of the Serbian Empire. In 1358, Vlatko donated his monastery to Chilandar, a Serbian monastery on Mount Athos.

== Architecture ==
The church is in the form of an elongated cross in a square with a narthex built at the same time. It originally had two domes (following the example of Lesnovo Monastery), but the one above the nave collapsed at some point, leaving the central part of the church uncovered. In the 19th century the church was repaired but the missing dome was never rebuilt.

The outer decoration is in alternate layers of bricks and stone with several double bay windows and some rustic sculpture. The original dedication of the church was inscribed in stone above the entrance but was destroyed during the Bulgarian occupation of Macedonia in World War I since it mentioned Emperor Uroš and King Vukašin as Serbian rulers.

== Fresco painting ==
The fresco decoration in Psača ranks among the best of the mid-14th century. It was executed between 1366 and 1371. On the south wall of the narthex we see the endowers' composition with old Paskač and his wife Ozra paired with Vlatko, holding a model of the church, and his wife Vladislava. In front of them stand their children (grandchildren) Stefan, Uroš and Uglješa, while above them is the icon of St Nicholas to whom the church and monastery were dedicated.

Facing this composition the artists painted young Emperor Uroš and, on his left, his co-ruler and designated heir, King Vukašin of the Mrnjavčević family. These are the best representations of these important historical figures. Both the portraits of the rulers and those of the nobleman with their families are of great importance in studies of medieval costumes. Unfortunately, the inscriptions by the portraits were all destroyed by the Bulgarians during their occupation in World War I. The eyes of King Vukašin and Emperor Uroš were also scratched during the same period.

The depictions of saints are done in strong colors, with much attention paid to psychological portraying. There is a cycle on St Nicholas and a composition Dormition of the Mother of God, while in the apse is the customary Communion of the Apostles with Church Fathers underneath it.

Some of the frescoes were rebrushed in the 19th century.
