= Vlatko Paskačić =

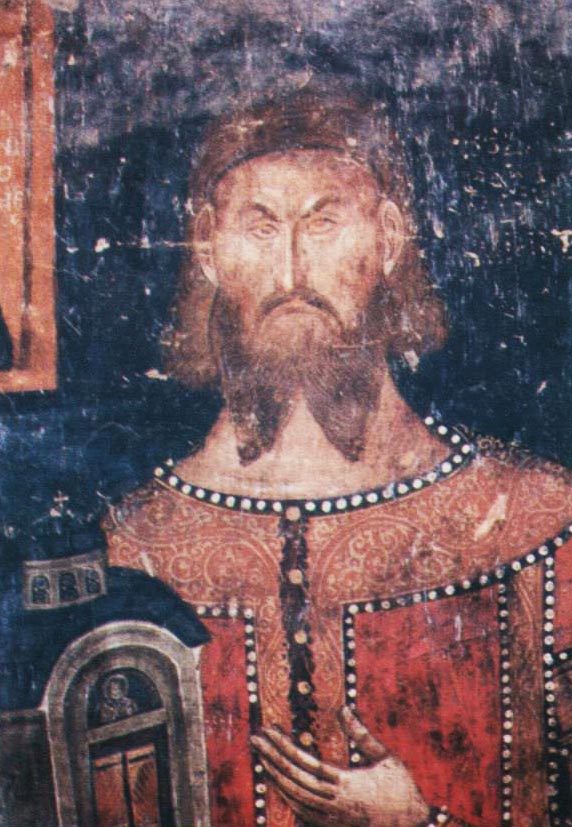
- Vlatko, detail of fresco in the Psača Monastery
- Born: Vlatko Paskačić; 14th century
- Title: Knez of Slavište
- Spouse: Vladislava
- Children: Stefan Vlatković; Uroš Vlatković; Uglješa Vlatković
- Parent(s): Paskač and Ozra

Vlatko Paskačić (Serbian: Влатко Паскачић) was a 14th-century Serbian feudal lord (sebastokrator) of Slavište region around Kriva Palanka under the Mrnjavčevići (1366-1395), in modern North Macedonia.

His father was Paskač, a noble during the time of Stefan Dušan, his mother was Ozra.

He ruled the Slavište župa stretching from Vranje in Serbia to Kriva Palanka in Macedonia. He and his father founded the Orthodox Christian Psača Monastery and donated it to Mount Athos.

He held the office of late Dejan Dragaš after his death, as Jovan Dragaš was still young.

He married Vladislava and had 3 children:

- Stefan Vlatković
- Uroš Vlatković
- Uglješa Vlatković

Ancestors of Vlatko Paskačić

2. Paskač
1. Vlatko Paskačić
3. Ozra
