= Ljubinci (Aleksandrovac) =

- Village
- Location within Serbia
- Coordinates: 43°25′31″N 21°06′01″E
- Country: Serbia
- District: Šumadija
- Municipality: Aleksandrovac

Population (2002)
  - Total: 323
- Time zone: UTC+1 (CET)
  - Summer (DST): UTC+2 (CEST)

Ljubinci (Serbian Cyrillic: Љубинци) is a village in the municipality of Aleksandrovac, Serbia. According to the 2002 census, the village has a population of 323 people.
