= Rankovce, Slovakia =

Rankovce Ránk
- Municipality
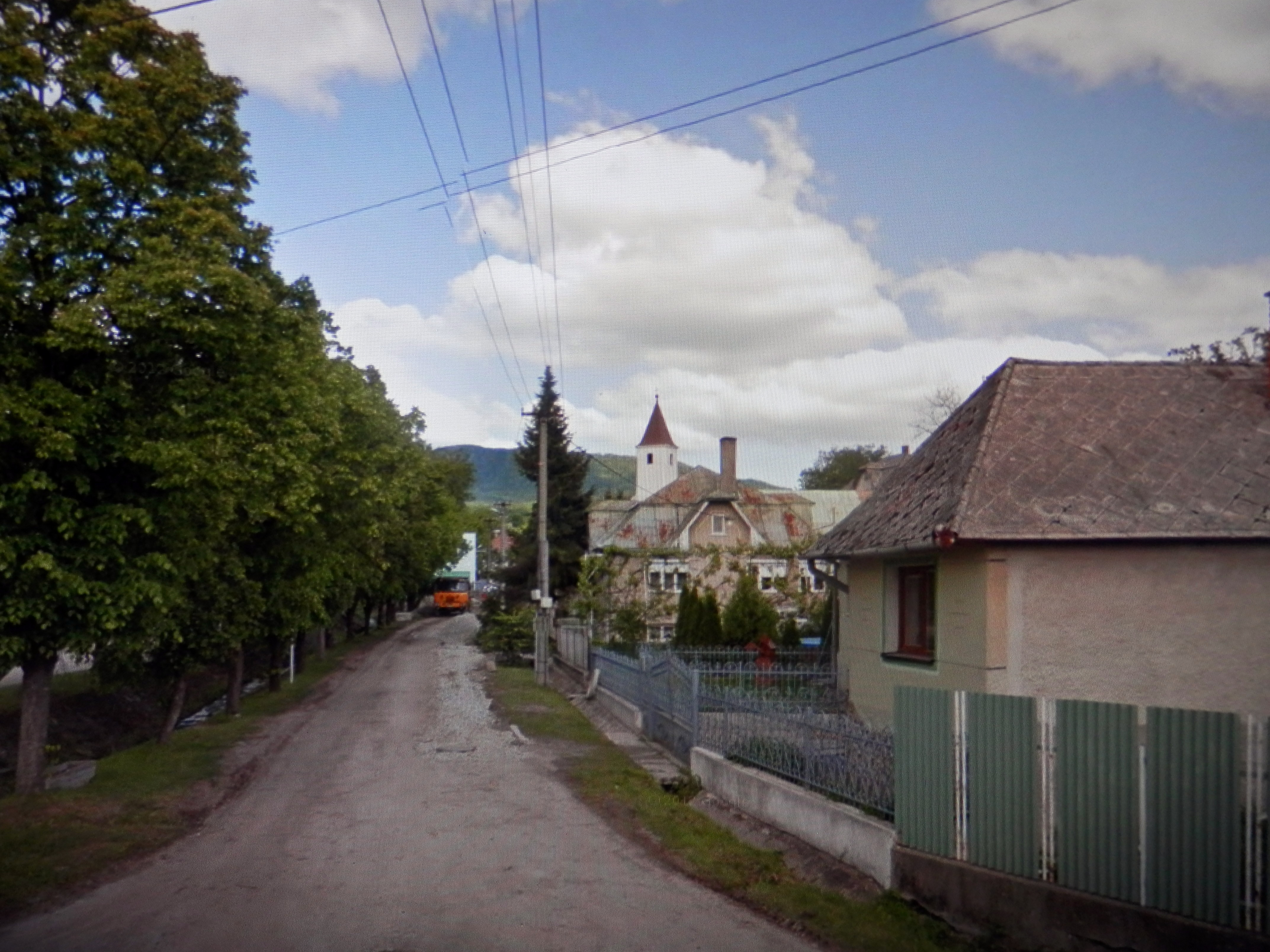

- Flag

- Location of Rankovce in the Košice Region Location of Rankovce in Slovakia
- Coordinates: 48.80°N 21.47°E
- Country: Slovakia
- Region: Košice Region
- District: Košice-okolie District
- First mentioned: 1332

Area
  - Total: 14.84 km^{2} (5.73 sq mi)
- Elevation: 359 m (1,178 ft)

Population (2025)
  - Total: 1,084
- Time zone: UTC+1 (CET)
  - Summer (DST): UTC+2 (CEST)
- Postal code: 444 6
- Area code: +421 55
- Vehicle registration plate (until 2022): KS
- Website: www.obecrankovce.sk

Rankovce (Hungarian: Ránk) is a village and municipality in Košice-okolie District in the Kosice Region of eastern Slovakia.

== History ==
In historical records the village was first mentioned in 1332.

== Geography ==
The municipality lies at an altitude of 359 metres (1,178 ft) and covers an area of 14.84 km^{2} (5.73 sq mi) (2025).

== Population ==
Population statistic (10 years)
Year	1995	2005	2015	2025
Count	505	604	822	1084
Difference		+19.60%	+36.09%	+31.87%

Population statistic
Year	2024	2025
Count	1070	1084
Difference		+1.30%

It has a population of 1084 people (31 December 2025).

=== Ethnicity ===
Census 2021 (1+ %)
Ethnicity	Number	Fraction
Slovak	867	90.88%
Romani	158	16.56%
Not found out	58	6.07%
Total	954	

In year 2021 was 954 people by ethnicity 867 as Slovak, 158 as Romani, 58 as Not found out, 3 as Czech, 1 as German and 1 as Other.

Note on population: The difference values of population numbers in the table "Population statistic" and in the sections "Ethnicity" & "Religion" is caused by the use of various statistical methods.

The vast majority of the municipality's population consists of the local Roma community. In 2019, they constituted an estimated 83% of the local population.

=== Religion ===
Census 2021 (1+ %)
Religion	Number	Fraction
Evangelical Church	518	54.3%
Roman Catholic Church	134	14.05%
None	113	11.84%
Seventh-day Adventist Church	100	10.48%
Not found out	49	5.14%
Greek Catholic Church	14	1.47%
Total	954	

In year 2021 was 954 people by religion 518 from Evangelical Church, 134 from Roman Catholic Church, 113 from None, 100 from Seventh-day Adventist Church, 49 from Not found out, 14 from Greek Catholic Church, 7 from Jehovah's Witnesses, 5 from Apostolic Church, 4 from Christian Congregations in Slovakia, 4 from United Methodist Church, 2 from Calvinist Church, 2 from Other and not ascertained christian church, 1 from Church of the Brethren and 1 from Buddhism.
