= Goleš, Travnik =

Goleš
- Village
- Location within Bosnia and Herzegovina
- Coordinates: 44.1935528°N 17.5298332°E
- Country: Bosnia and Herzegovina
- Entity: Federation of Bosnia and Herzegovina
- Canton: Central Bosnia
- Municipality: Travnik

Area
  - Total: 5.73 sq mi (14.85 km^{2})

Population (2013)
  - Total: 425
  - Density: 74.1/sq mi (28.6/km^{2})
- Time zone: UTC+1 (CET)
  - Summer (DST): UTC+2 (CEST)

Goleš is a village in the municipality of Travnik, Bosnia and Herzegovina.

== Demographics ==
According to the 2013 census, its population was 425.

Ethnicity in 2013
Ethnicity	Number	Percentage
Bosniaks	419	98.6%
other/undeclared	6	1.4%
Total	425	100%
