= Pčinja (river) =

River in Serbia and North Macedonia

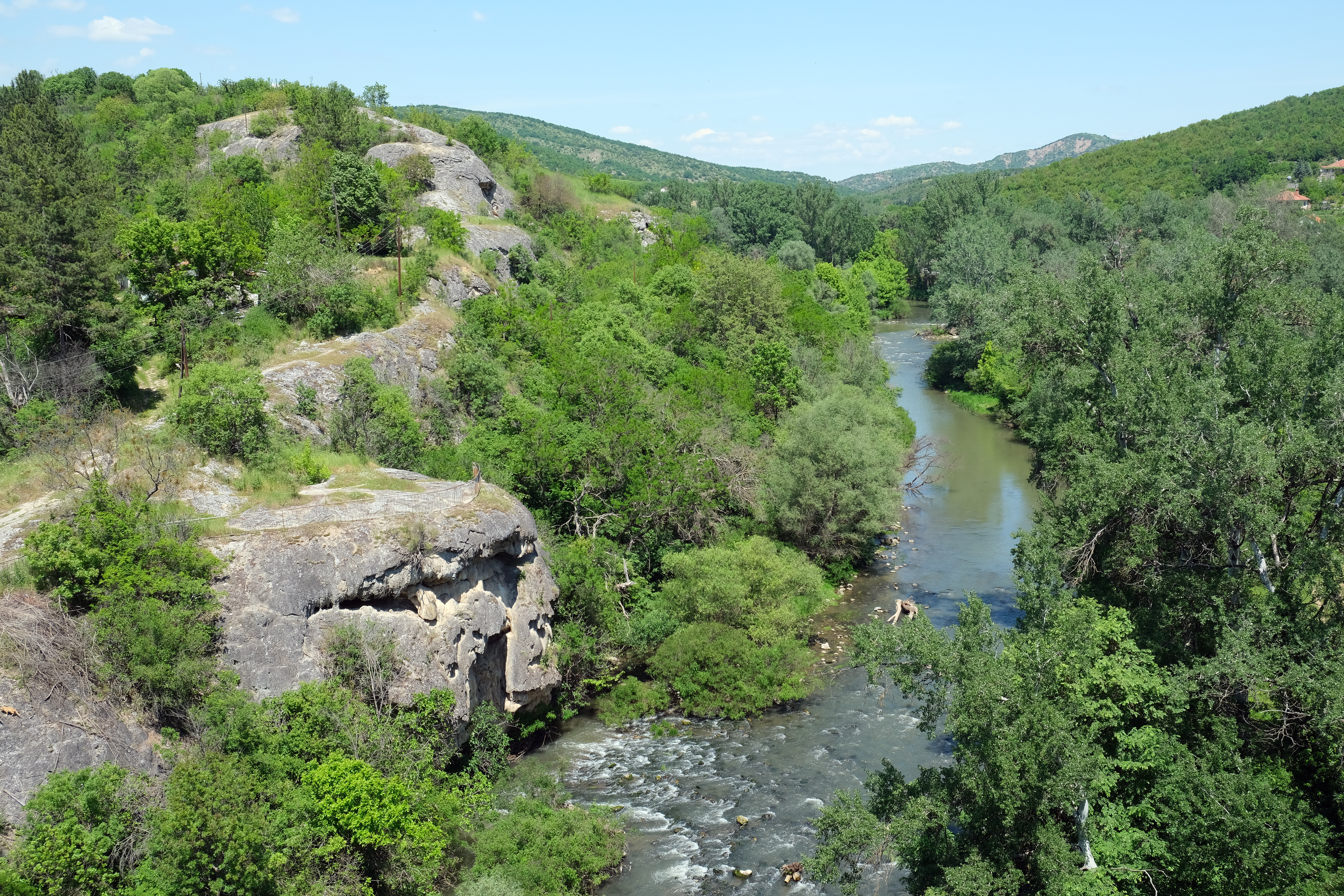
- Pčinja in Katlanovo

Location
- Country: Serbia, North Macedonia

Physical characteristics
- Mouth
  - location: Vardar
  - coordinates: 41.819°N 21.6722°E
- Length: 135 km (84 mi)

Basin features
- Progression: Vardar→ Aegean Sea

The Pčinja (Serbian and Macedonian Пчиња [pt͡ʃîɲa]) is a 135 km long river in Serbia and North Macedonia, a left tributary of the Vardar River.

== Serbia ==
The Pčinja originates from several streams on the western slopes of the Dukat Mountain which meet at the village of Radovnica and continue to the west originally under the name of the Tripušnica (Serbian Cyrillic: Трипушница). The river creates a micro-region of Pčinja, with center being the municipal seat of Trgovište where Tripušnica meets the left tributary of the Lesnička River (Serbian: Лесничка Река, romanized: Lesnička Reka) from the south and continues to the west under the name of Pčinja. The region represents one of the fastest depopulating and economically least developed parts of Serbia (population of 12,556 in 1971 (34 per km^{2}) and 6,372 in 2002 (17 per km^{2}; down 50%). After the Pčinja passes next to the northern side of the mountain of Široka Planina and the village of Šajince where it receives the right tributary of the Koćurica (Serbian Cyrillic: Коћурица) from the north, it is prevented to continue to the west by the eastern side of the Rujan Mountain and turns south, into the narrow valley between the Rujan and Kozjak mountains. The small village and monastery of Prohor Pčinjski are located in the valley. Just after the river passes next to the monastery, after 52 km of flow in Serbia, the Pčinja crosses the Macedonian border.

== North Macedonia ==
For the remaining 83 km, the river bends gently to the southwest. It passes next to the villages of Karlovce, Dragomance, Strnovac, Vojnik, Klečevce, Pčinja, Studena Bara, Gorno Konjare, Dolno Konjare and the small town of Katlanovo, with the neighboring Katlanovska Banja, the most popular spa in North Macedonia. The upper course in North Macedonia creates a micro-region of Sredorek (Macedonian: Средорек), and the lower a micro-region of Kotorci (Macedonian: Которци), with the Bader Gorge (Macedonian: Бадерска Клисура, romanized: Baderska Klisura) in between. In the lower course, the Pčinja follows the western side of the mountain Gradištanska and flows into the Vardar River, on the gorge of Taor section of the Vardar's course, halfway between the cities of Skopje and Veles.

Katlanovo is located on the Skopje–Thessaloniki highway, and even though some 25 km away from Skopje, a string of Skopje's fast growing suburbs is located along the highway (Jurumleri, Idrizovo, Petrovec), and if the city continues to grow, in some future it will reach Katlanovo and the banks of Pčinja.

== Characteristics ==
- The Pčinja belongs to the Aegean Sea drainage basin. Its own drainage area covers 3.140 km^{2}, of that 1.247 km^{2} in Serbia and 1.893 km^{2} in North Macedonia.
- The average discharge on the river's mouth into the Vardar is 14 m³/s, and it is not navigable.
- All the major tributaries of the Pčinja are in North Macedonia: Bistrica, Petroshnica and Kriva Reka from the left; Kumanovska reka, from the right.

== Gallery ==
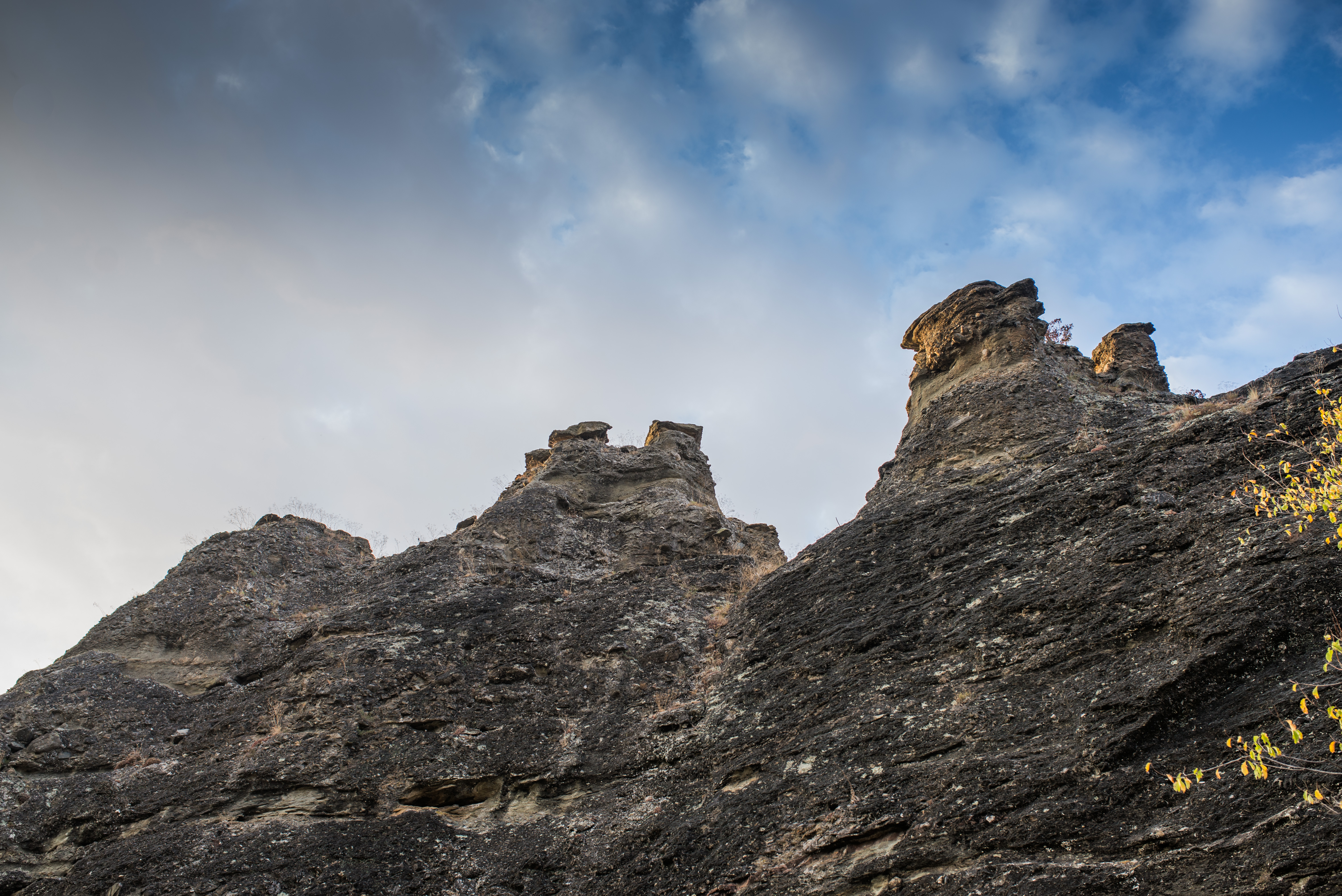
Natural phenomenon - “Vražji kamen” in the Pčinja valley.

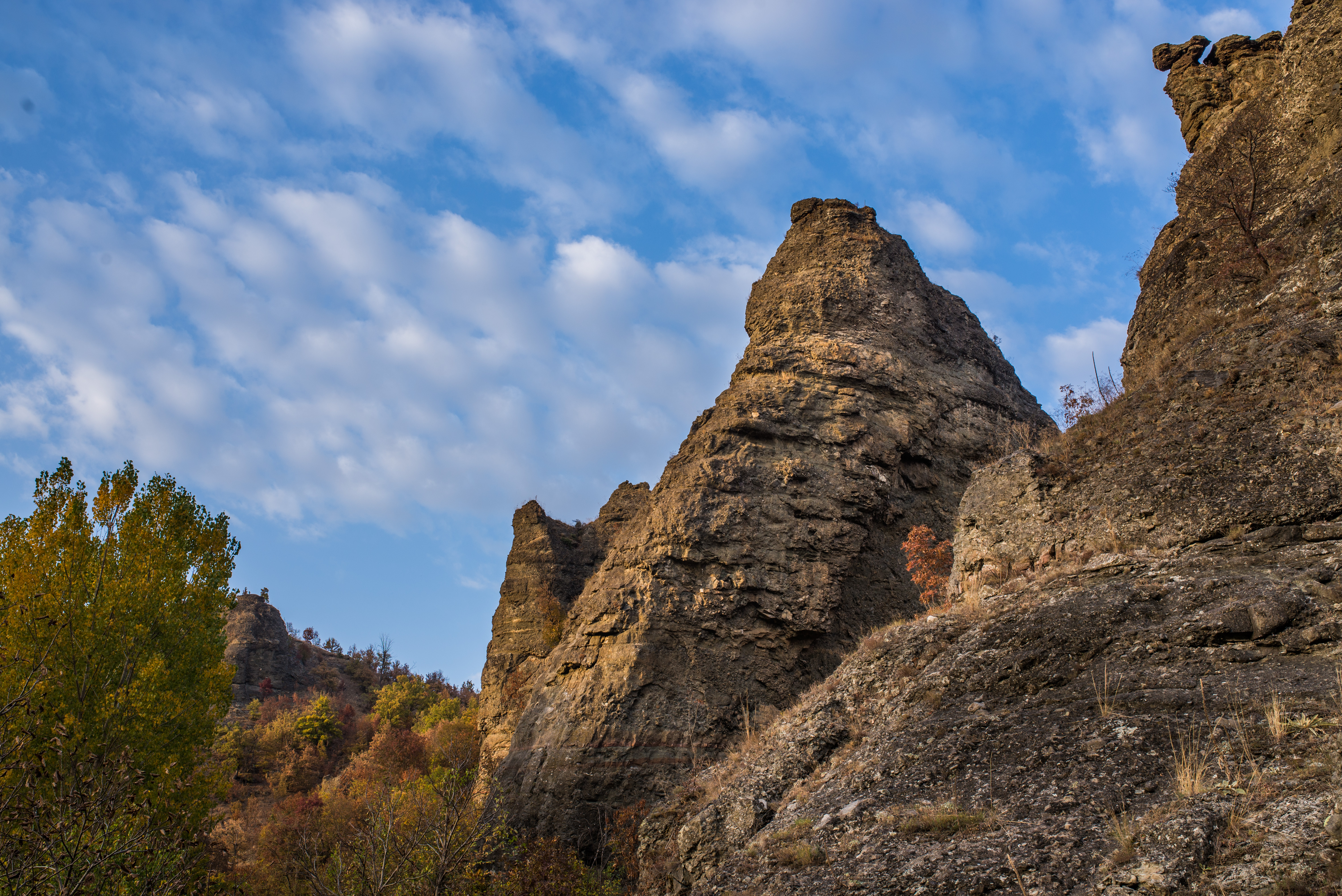
Natural phenomenon - “Vražji kamen” in the Pčinja valley.

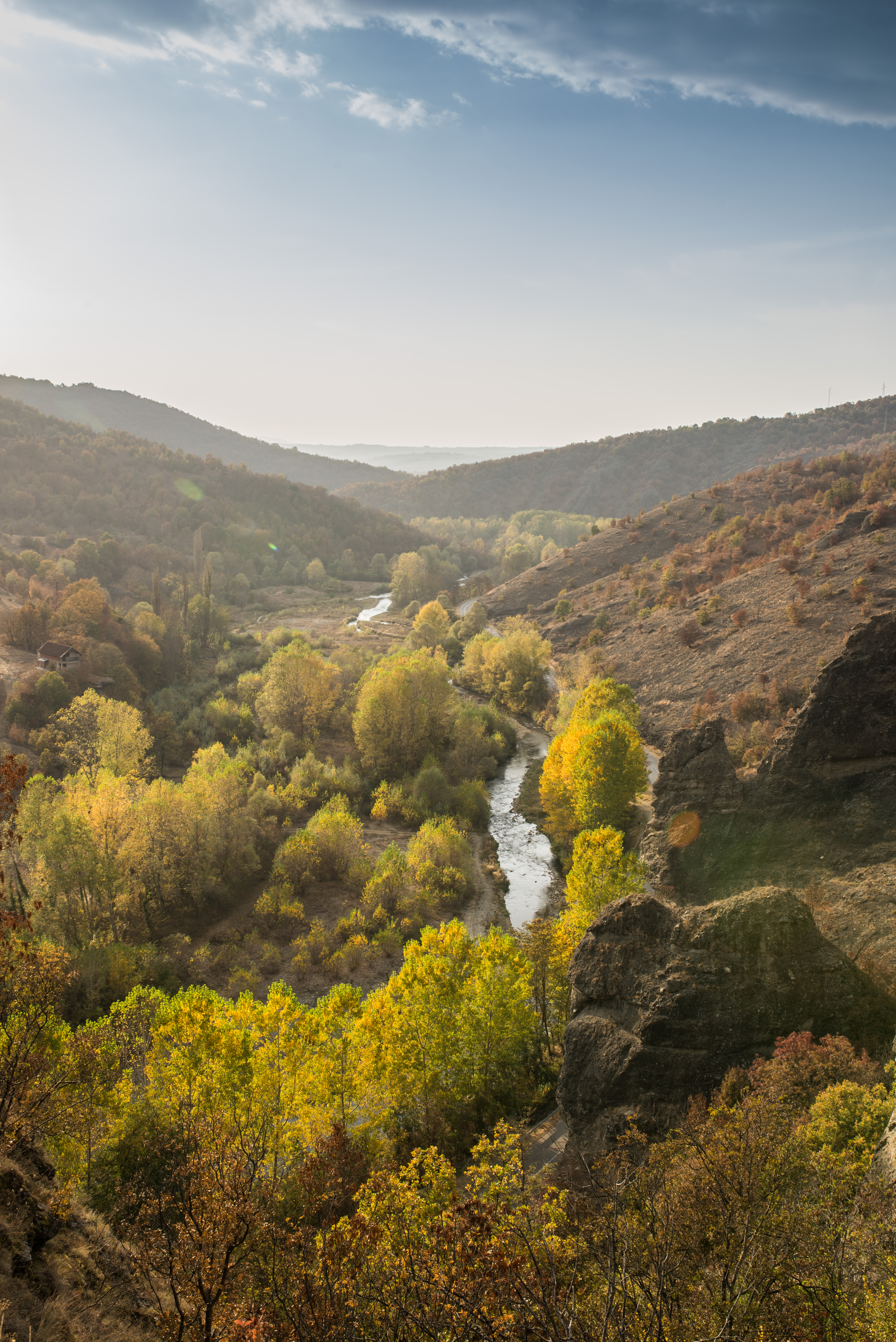
Pčinja river valley.

== See also ==
- PIM "Ivan Milutinović", Belgrade, Serbia; Morava - Vardar (Axios) Navigation Route (About 1,200 km shorter route (three days shorter time of navigation) from Belgrade to Port of Thessaloniki than across Danube, Black Sea and Aegean Sea. Electric power production, improvement of water quality and regulation of flooding wave.)
- Morava - Vardar (Axios) Navigation Route map
- Hydropower and navigation system "Morava" (Concepts of regulation of rivers Great Morava and South Morava for navigation and hydropower production.)
