= Kriva River (Pčinja) =

- Kriva River watershed
- Native name: Крива Река (Macedonian)

Location
- Country: Republic of North Macedonia

Physical characteristics
- Source
  - location: Carev vrh, Osogovo mountain
- Mouth
  - location: Pčinja
  - coordinates: 42°7′14″N 21°50′34″E
- Length: 75 km (47 mi)
- Basin size: 1,002 km^{2} (387 sq mi)
- Discharge
  - average: 14 m^{3}/s (490 cu ft/s)

Basin features
- Progression: Pčinja→ Vardar→ Aegean Sea

The Kriva River (Macedonian: Крива Река, romanized: Kriva Reka) is a 75 km long river in northeastern North Macedonia, and the biggest left tributary of the Pčinja River.

The name Kriva Reka means "Curved River" in Macedonian.

== Geography and tributaries ==
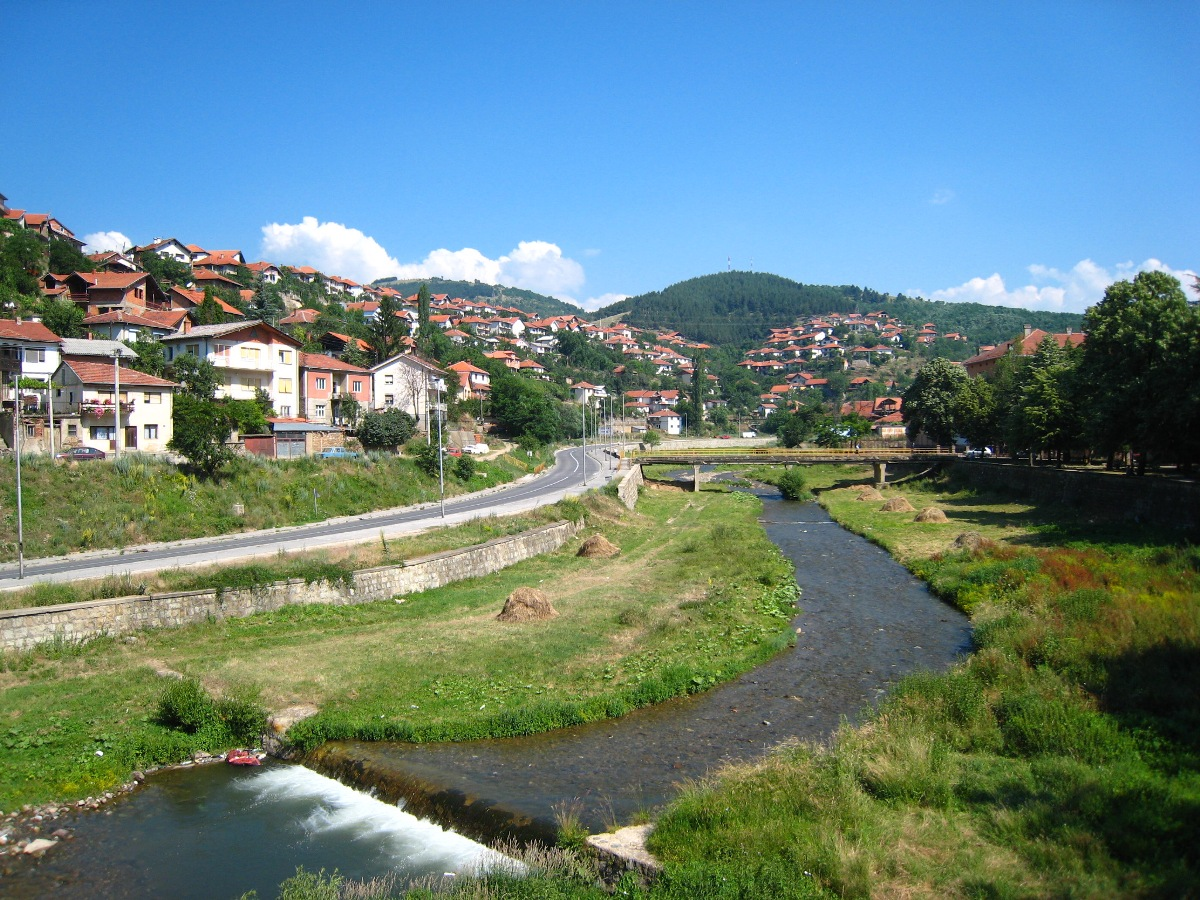
Kriva Reka river flowing through the town of Kriva Palanka

The river rises at the northeastern slopes of Osogovo Mountain below the peak Carev Vrv 2,085 metres (6,841 ft), at an altitude of 1,932 metres (6,339 ft). On the mouth close to village Klečevce river flows at an altitude of 294 metres (965 ft). From the spring to the first tributary of the Kiselička reka (18 kilometres (11 mi) from the source), the river flows northwest, then turns sharply to the southwest.

The major tributaries of the Kriva Reka are: Kiselicka reka, Gaberska reka, Raska reka, Rankovecka reka, Vetunicka reka, Drzava (or Rudjinska drzava), Zivusa, Duracka reka, Kratovska reka, Povisnica and Vrlej. It belongs to the Aegean Sea drainage basin. Kriva Reka drains an area of around 1,002 square kilometres (387 sq mi).

== Bibliography ==
- Kvalitet na površinskite vodi vo slivot na Kriva reka, O. Dimitrovska, I.Milevski, Bilten za fizička geografija, Skopje, 2005.
