= Slavište =

Slavište, also known as the Kriva Palanka Plain, is a historical region around Kriva Palanka, in the northeastern part of North Macedonia, once by the medieval fortified town of Slavište, also known as Gradište, west of the modern town. The name Slavište is first mentioned in 1321, in the Gračanica charter of Serbian king Stefan Milutin (r. 1282–1321), though it is believed to be older. During the Serbian Empire (1345–1371), the Slavište župa (county) consisted of the surrounding of modern-day Kriva Palanka which was the hereditary land of the Paskačić noble family. It was to the east of the Žegligovo župa, surrounding modern-day Kumanovo, and to the southwest of Osogovo, part of the land of the Dejanović noble family. In 1573, the Ottoman nahia of Slavište was recorded. The region is used in neotectonics.
