= Northeastern Statistical Region =

Statistical region

Coordinates: 42.1400°N 21.7100°E

Northeastern Statistical Region Североисточен Регион Rajoni verilindor
- Statistical region
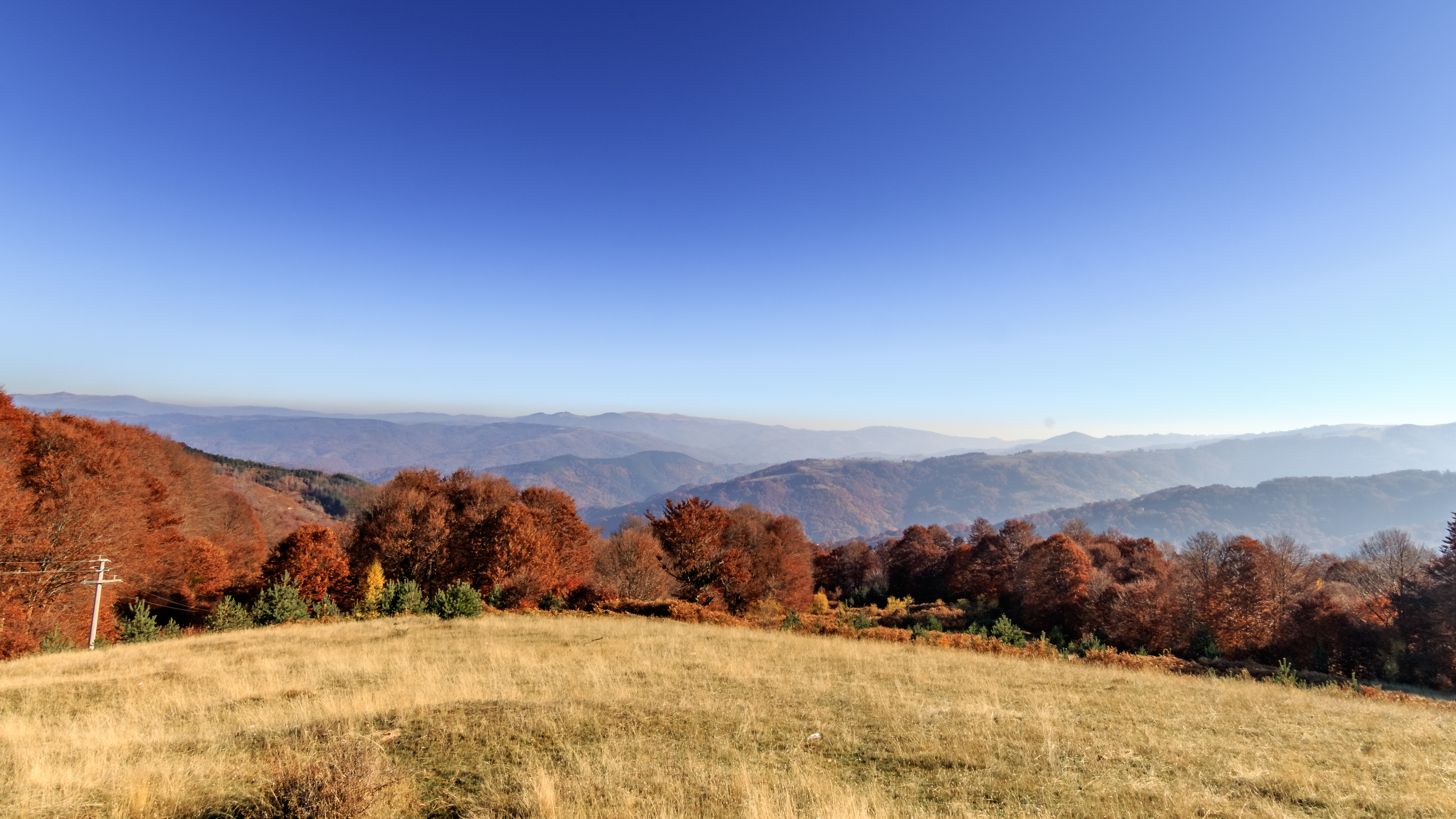
- Landscape of the Northeastern Region

- Flag

Area
  - Total: 2,306 km^{2} (890 sq mi)

Population (2021)
  - Total: 152,982
  - Density: 66.34/km^{2} (171.8/sq mi)
- HDI (2017): 0.732 high · 8th of 8

The Northeastern Statistical Region (Macedonian: Североисточен Регион, romanized: Severoistočen Region; Albanian: Rajoni verilindor) is one of eight statistical regions in North Macedonia.

== Geography ==
The region borders Kosovo and Serbia to the north and Bulgaria to the east, while internally, it borders the Skopje and Eastern statistical regions. The region includes the Kostoperska Karpa site.

== Municipalities ==
The municipalities of the region

Northeastern Statistical Region is divided into six municipalities:

- Kratovo Municipality
- Kriva Palanka Municipality
- Kumanovo Municipality
- Lipkovo Municipality
- Rankovce Municipality
- Staro Nagoričane Municipality

== Demographics ==
=== Population ===
The current population of the Northeastern Statistical Region is 152,982 citizens or 8.3% of the total population of North Macedonia, according to the last population census in 2021.

Census year	Population	Change
1994	163,841	N/A
2002	172,787	+5.46%
2021	152,982	-11.46%

=== Ethnicities ===
Map of the majority ethnic groups in the region.

The largest ethnic group in the region are the Macedonians followed by the Albanians.

	2002		2021
	Number	%	Number	%
TOTAL	172,787	100	152,982	100
Macedonians	102,108	59.09	83,978	54.89
Albanians	53,651	31.05	47,081	30.78
Serbs	10,512	6.08	7,075	4.62
Roma	5,133	2.97	3,488	2.28
Turks	302	0.17	151	0.1
Vlachs	152	0.09	123	0.08
Bosniaks	28	0.03	44	0.03
Others / Undeclared / Unknown	901	0.52	899	0.59
Persons for whom data are taken from administrative sources			10,143	6.63

=== Religions ===
Religious affiliation according to the 2002 Macedonia census and 2021 North Macedonia census:

Religion	2002		2021
Religion	Number	%	Number	%
TOTAL	172,787	100	152,982	100
Orthodox	111,332	64.4	71,306	60.0
Christians/Protestants	15	0.01	20,291	60.0
Catholics	141	0.08	181	60.0
Islam	58,842	34.1	50,690	33.1
Others	2,457	1.42	1,217	0.23
Refused/Undeclared			10,143	6.63
