= Statistical regions of North Macedonia =

One of the eight regions into which North Macedonia is divided

- Category: Unitary state
- Location: North Macedonia
- Number: 8 statistical regions
- Populations: 138,722 (Vardar) – 607,007 (Skopje)
- Government: National government
- Subdivisions: Municipality

North Macedonia is divided into eight statistical regions.

== Regions ==
Region	Area (km^{2})	Macedonian name	Population (2002 census)	Population (2021 census)	Largest city
Eastern	3,537	Источен регион	181,858	150,234	Štip
Northeastern	2,310	Североисточен регион	172,787	152,982	Kumanovo
Pelagonia	4,717	Пелагониски регион	238,136	210,431	Bitola
Polog	2,416	Полошки регион	304,125	251,552	Tetovo
Skopje	1,812	Скопски регион	578,144	607,007	Skopje
Southeastern	2,739	Југоисточен регион	171,416	148,387	Strumica
Southwestern	3,340	Југозападен регион	221,546	177,398	Ohrid
Vardar	4,042	Вардарски регион	154,535	138,722	Veles

== See also ==
- List of regions of North Macedonia by Human Development Index
- Municipalities of North Macedonia
