= Clock Tower (Bitola) =

Clock tower in Pelagonia, North Macedonia

- Саат кула
- The Clock Tower in the morning

- Location within North Macedonia

General information
- Status: Completed
- Location: Bitola, North Macedonia
- Coordinates: 41°01′51″N 21°20′02″E

The Clock Tower of Bitola, known as Saat Kula (Macedonian: Саат кула), is a clock tower and one of the landmarks of the Macedonian city of Bitola. The clock tower in Bitola is a very practical monument aiding people with the time of day.

The original clock tower was first built in 1664 by Mahmut Bey when the city was part of the Ottoman Empire and known as Manastır. Legend has it that the Turks collected 60,000 eggs from the surrounding villages and mixed the shells into the construction mortar. The Ottomans rebuilt the tower in the 1830s, in the same period when the Orthodox Church of St. Demetrius was being built.

It is located in the immediate center of Bitola on the northern part of the main street Širok Sokak not far away from Magnolia Square, where there are numerous cultural and historical monuments, as well as new construction. The clock tower is 33 meters high, with sides of per 5.8 m. On all four sides are entrenched special metal plates mounted to the hands and inscribed with Roman numbers from one to twelve. During the Turkish era, the numbers used were Eastern Arabic numerals. On the uppermost part is a small dome, which offers a panorama of the city and the wider environment. In more recent times restoration was conducted on the tower, which has not changed its original appearance, apart from the cross installed on the cupola shortly after the end of Ottoman rule (it does not feature, for example, in an 1848 painting by Edward Lear).

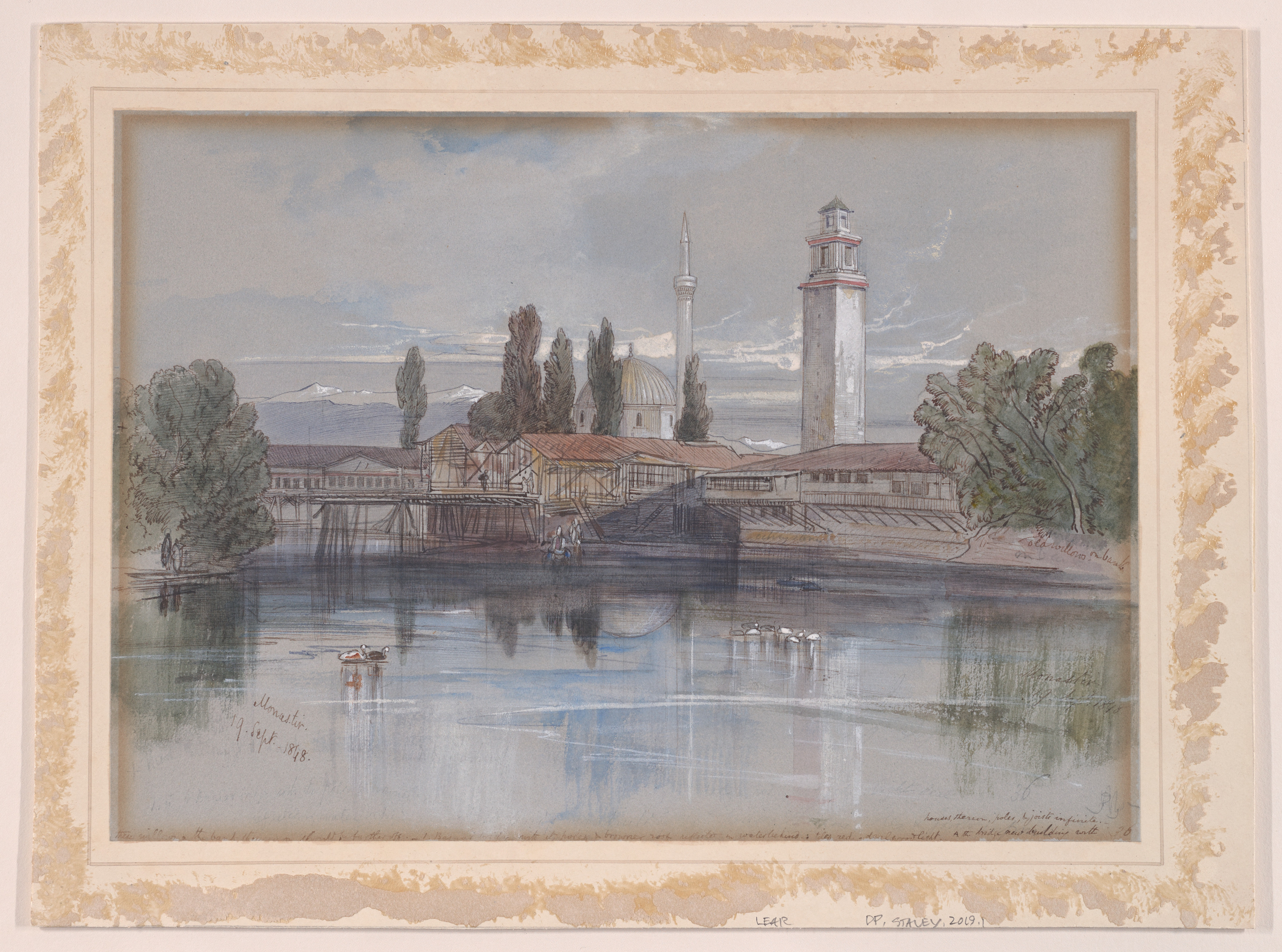
The Monastir Clock Tower, painting by Edward Lear, 1848. The Gazi Hajdar Kadi Mosque can be seen in the background.

The clock tower was constructed with massive stone blocks. The main and also most decorative part of the clock tower is the part where you set the clock. The entrance to the clock tower encircled by large marble blocks is located on the north side and about a hundred stairs leads to the clock, to its peak of approximately 32 m. These steps lead to the top where in the past the big metal bells stood indicating the time. In 1927 its first clock mechanism was developed by the German company Konfage. People that were required to ring the bells were replaced with so called sajdzhii (clock keepers) who were responsible for maintaining the clock and the clock mechanism. At first there was white clock face with black numbers and hands, and was smaller than the present. This clock mechanism was replaced in 1936. 15 new bells (weighing 900 kg) were placed in the tower as a sign of gratitude for the construction of the Memorial Cemetery of German soldiers killed in the First World War.

In 1962 the mechanism was restored, and in 1970 a keyboard mechanism was installed to play new songs. The clock tower is one of the 180 towers in the world which has embedded such a mechanism.

In 2015, an old Turkish inscription dedicated to the tower, long thought lost, was rediscovered and reassembled at the nearby Gazi Hajdar Kadi Mosque. It was crafted by the renowned Ottoman calligrapher Kazasker Mustafa Izzet Efendi, whose work includes the giant medallions on the cornices of the Hagia Sophia in Istanbul.

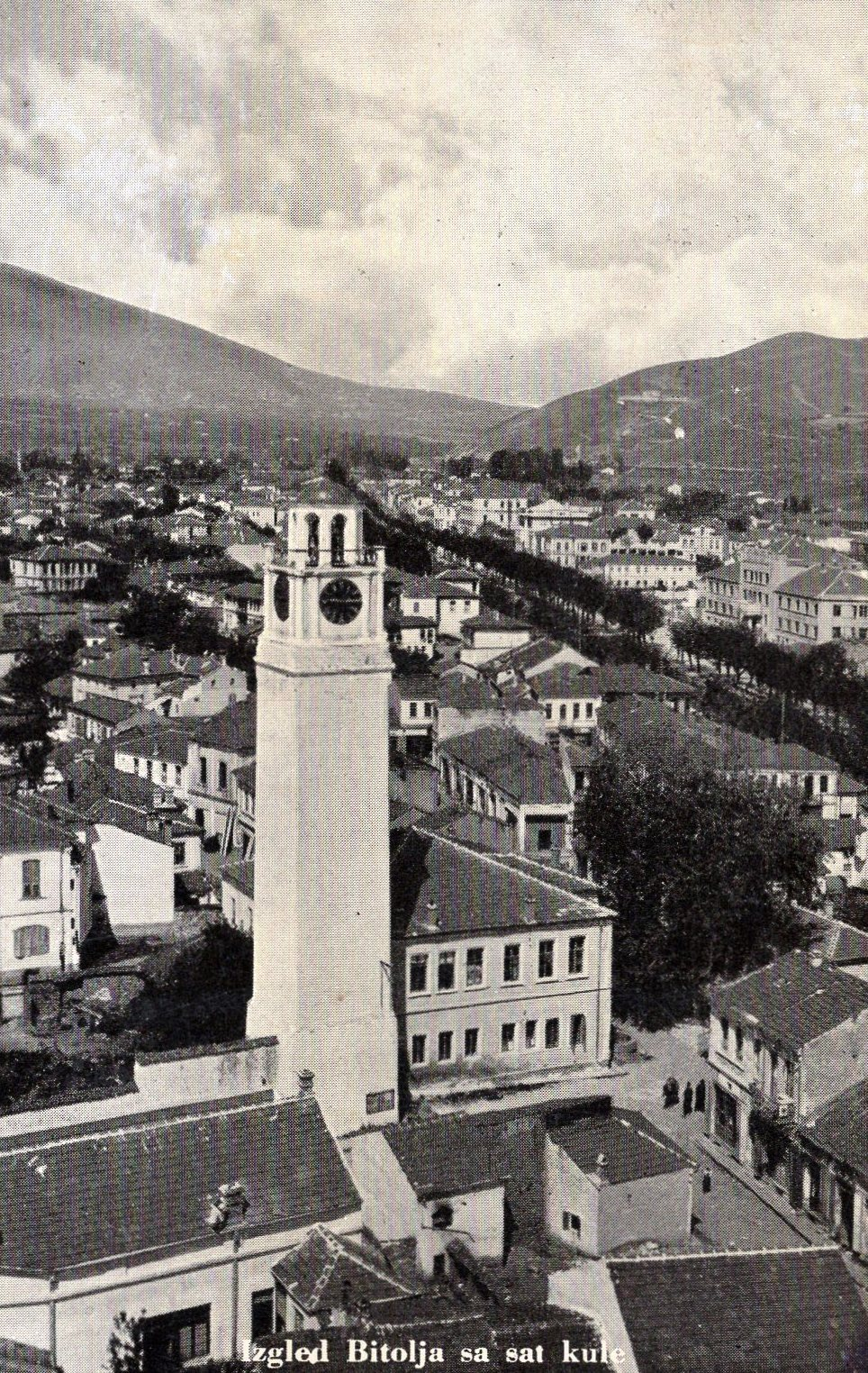
The Clock Tower of Bitola in the 1930s.

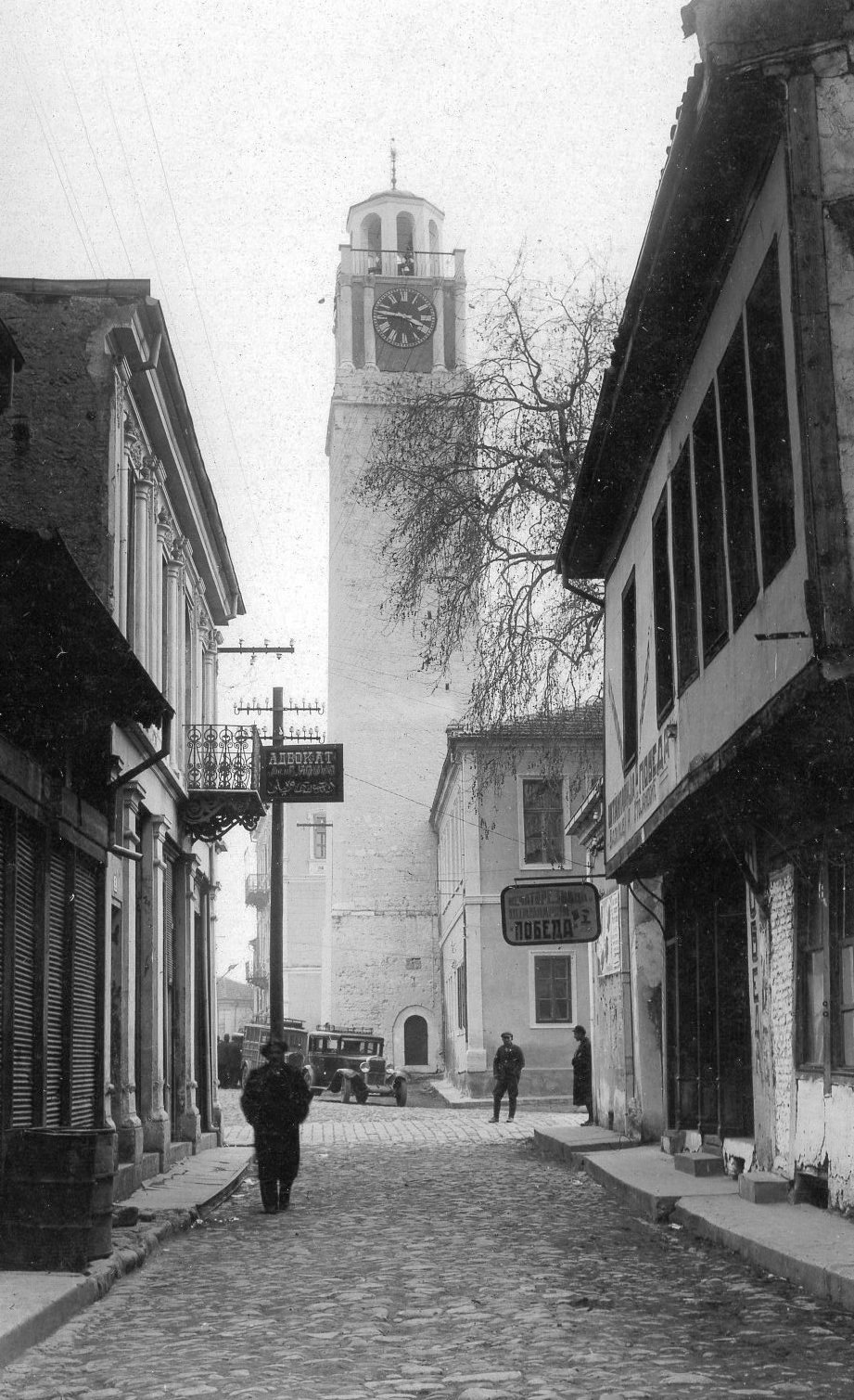
The Clock Tower of Bitola in the 1930s.

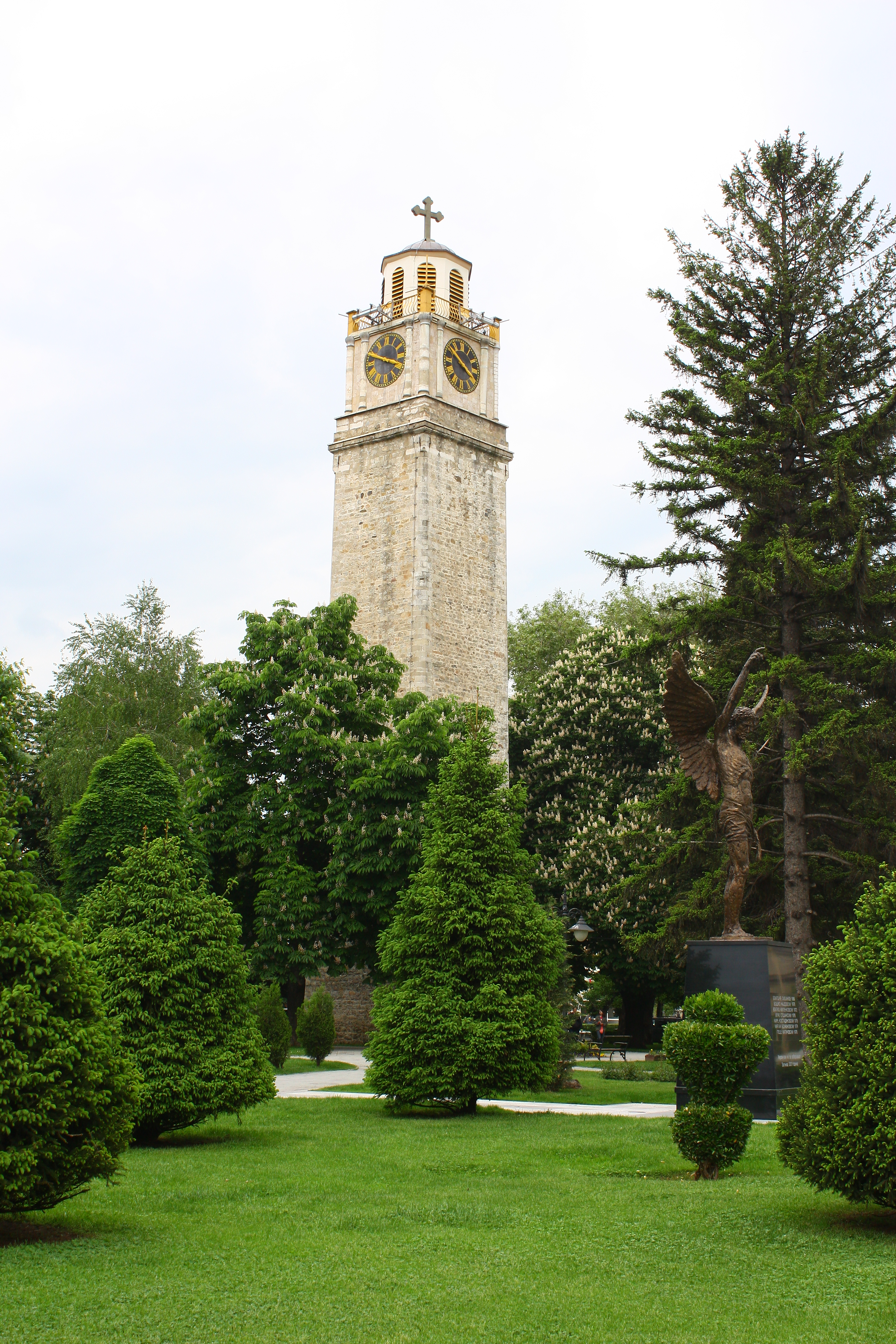
The Clock Tower within the park surrounding it.

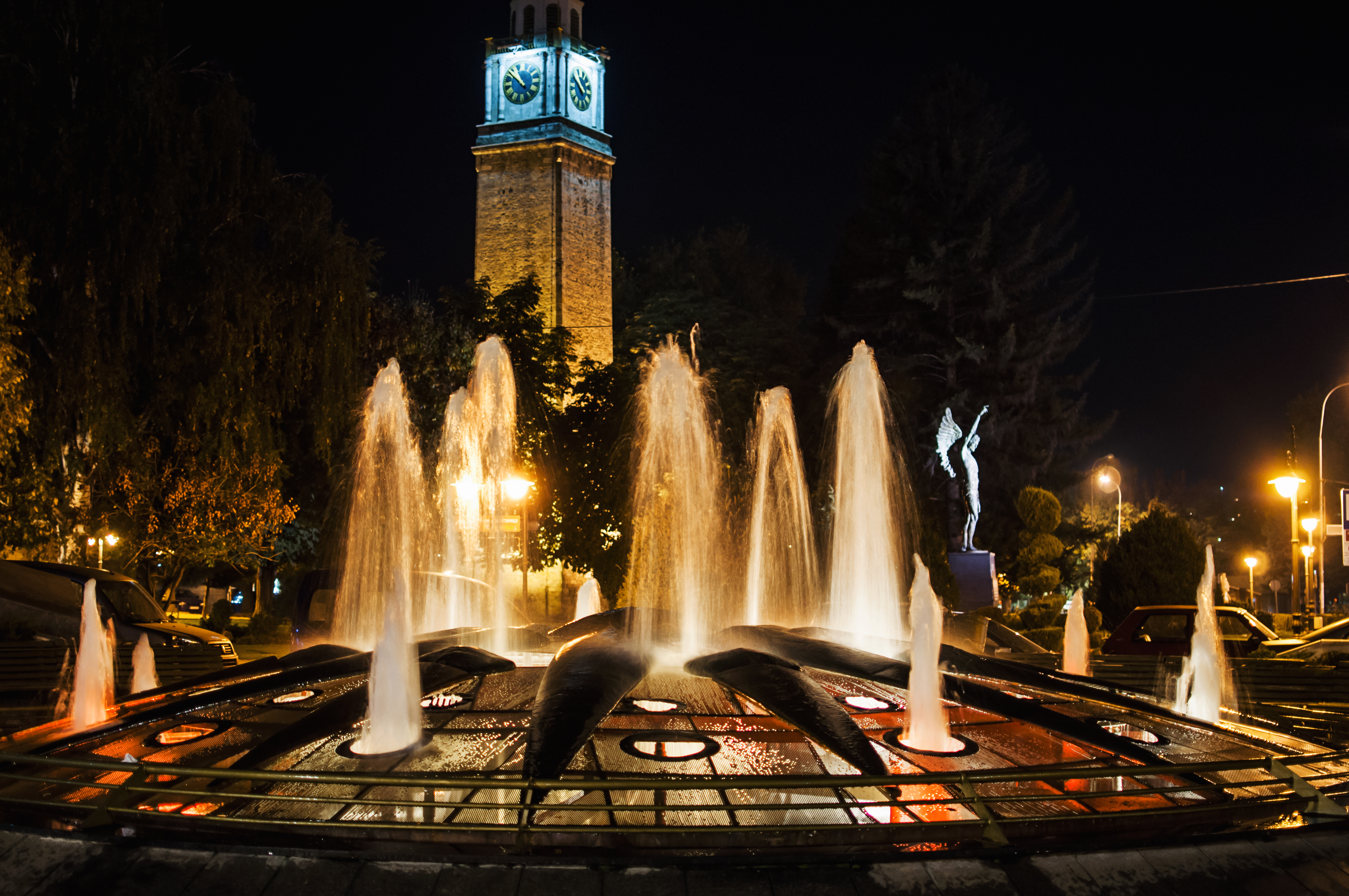
The Clock Tower at night.
