= Širok Sokak =

Street in Bitola Municipality, North Macedonia

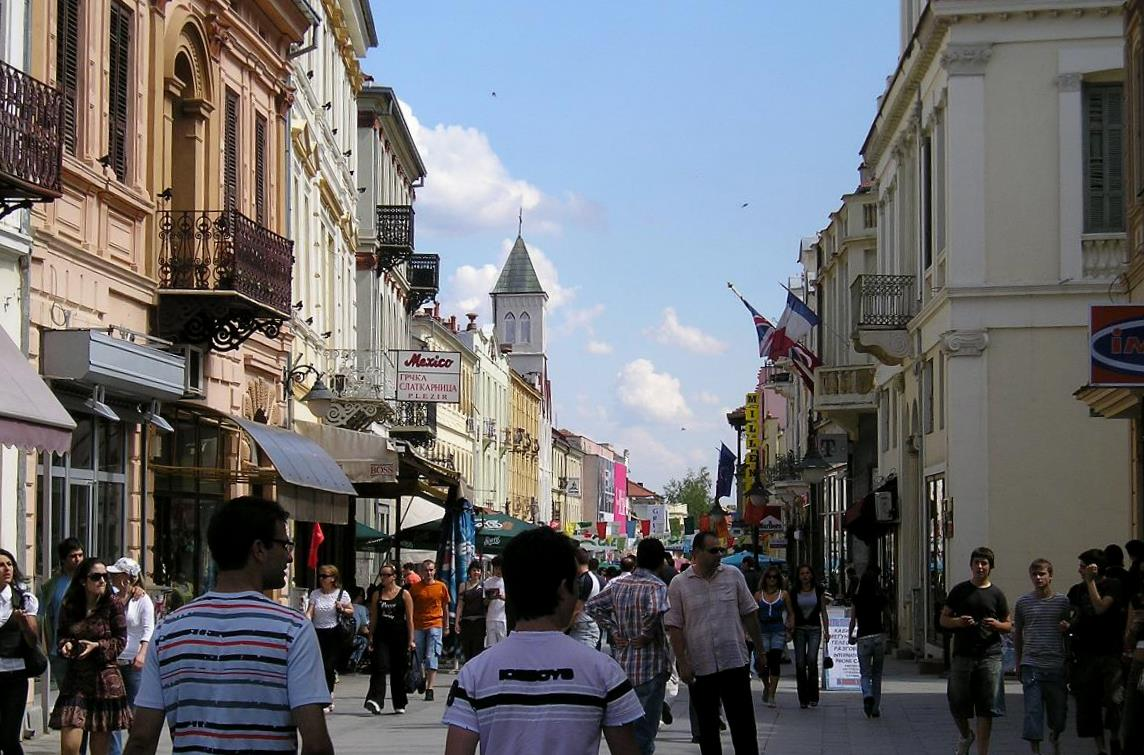
- Širok Sokak
- Native name: Широк Сокак (Macedonian)
- Former name(s): Marshal Tito • Маршал Тито
- Length: 910 m (2,990 ft)
- Location: Bitola, North Macedonia
- Postal code: 7000
- Coordinates: 41.029°N 21.335°E
- From: Magnolia Square
- To: City Park

Širok Sokak (Macedonian: Широк Сокак, meaning "Wide Alley", from the Turkish word for "Street") is a long pedestrian street in Bitola, Macedonia. The street is considered to be the centre of Bitola. It roughly starts at Magnolia Square and ends in the City Park. It is graced with neo-classical buildings that contain stores, cafés and restaurants. Širok Sokak is also home to several consulates, the Officers' Hall, and the Co-Cathedral of the Sacred Heart. The present street dates from the reign of Sultan Abdul Hamid II and it was named after him. It was later named after King Petar and then Maršal Tito.

== Gallery ==
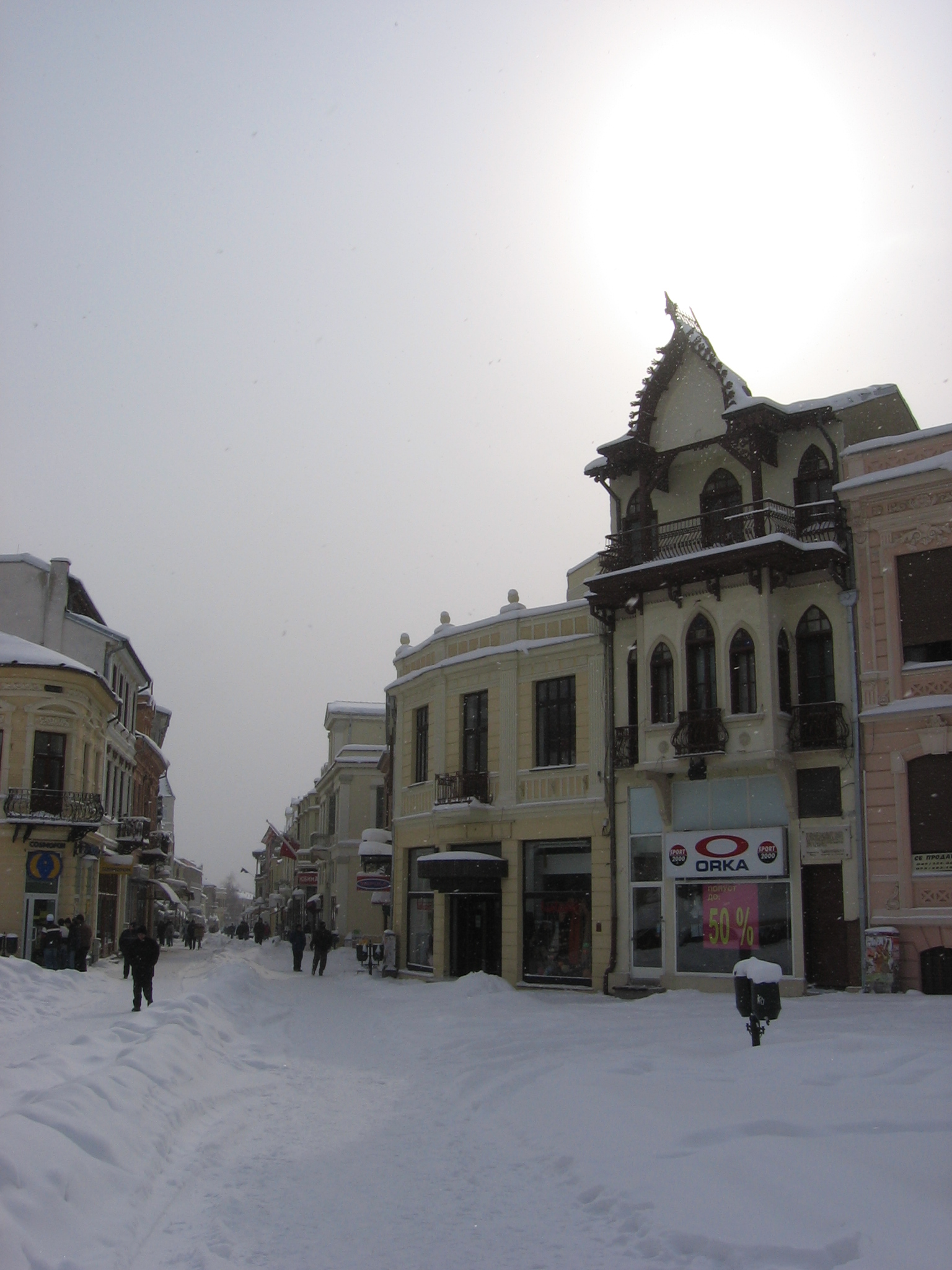
Snow-covered

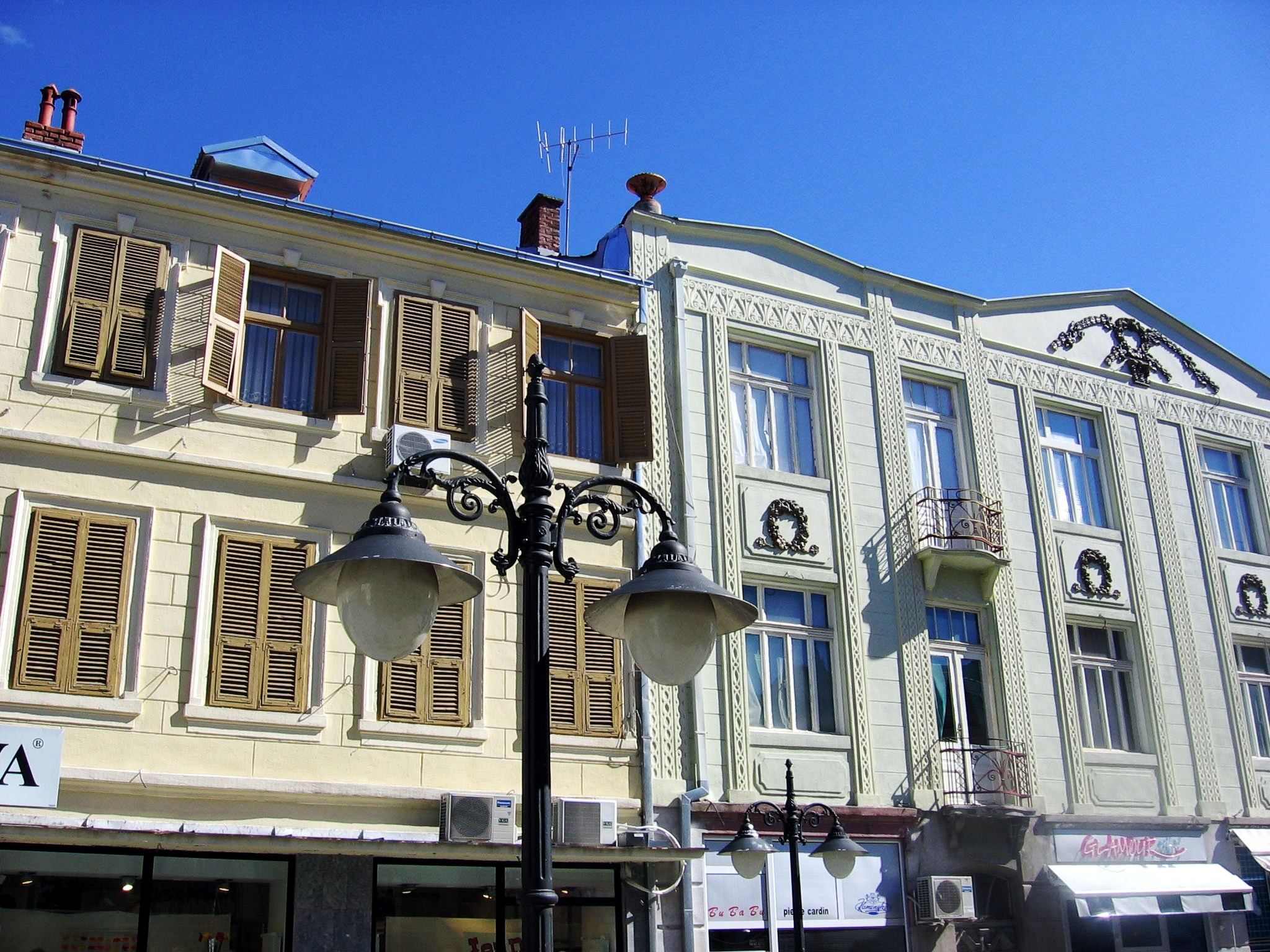
Typical architecture

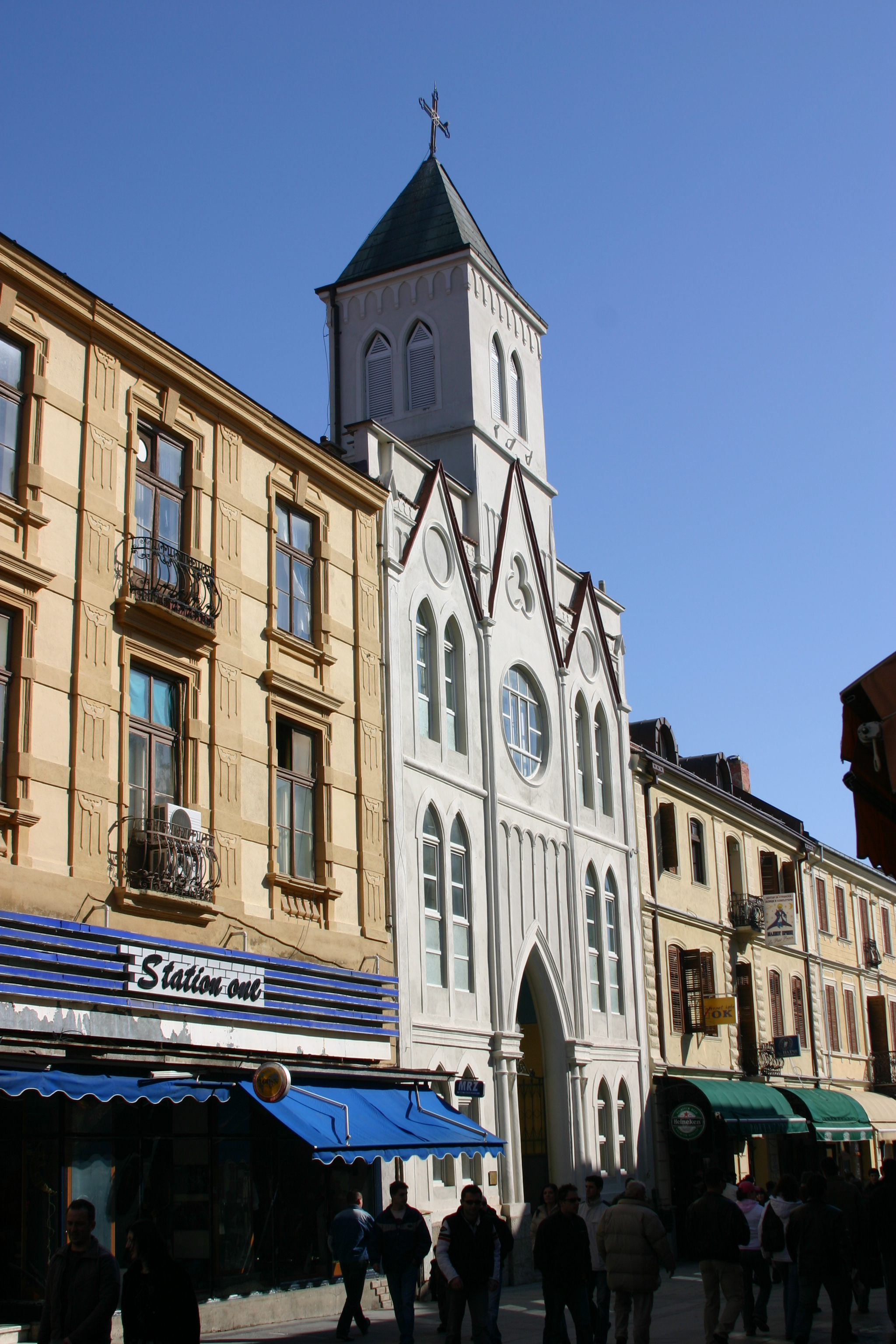
Catholic Church

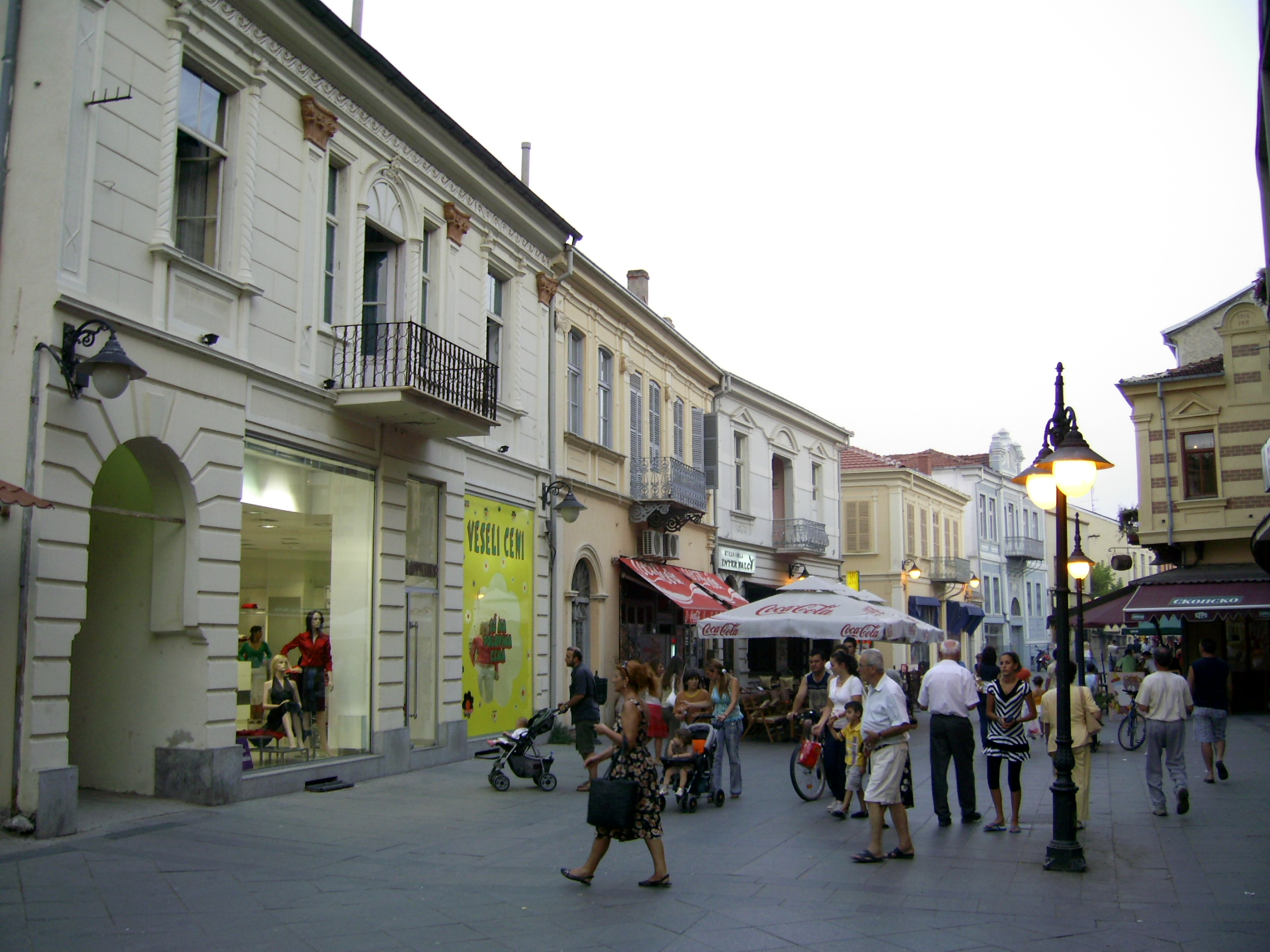

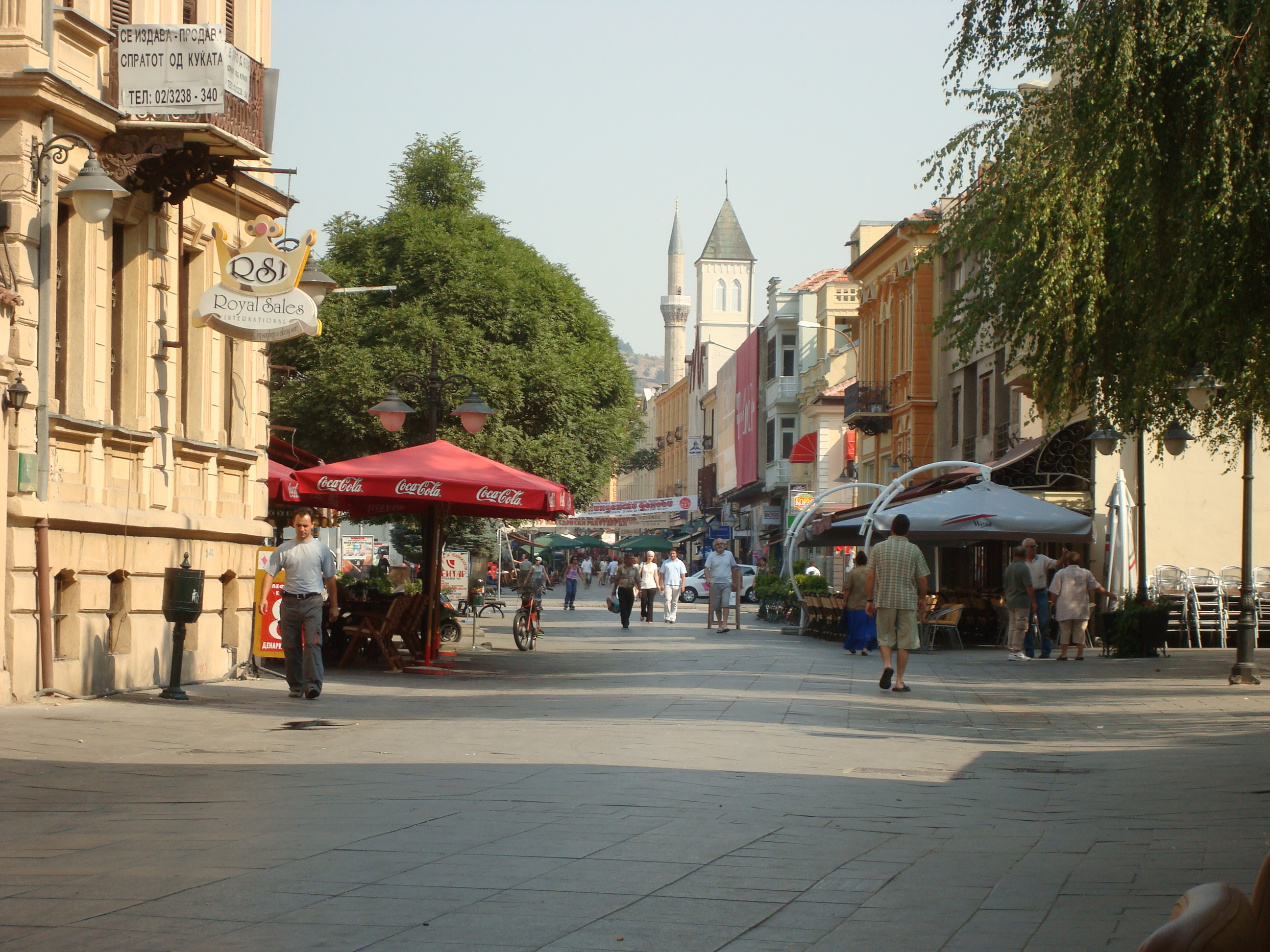

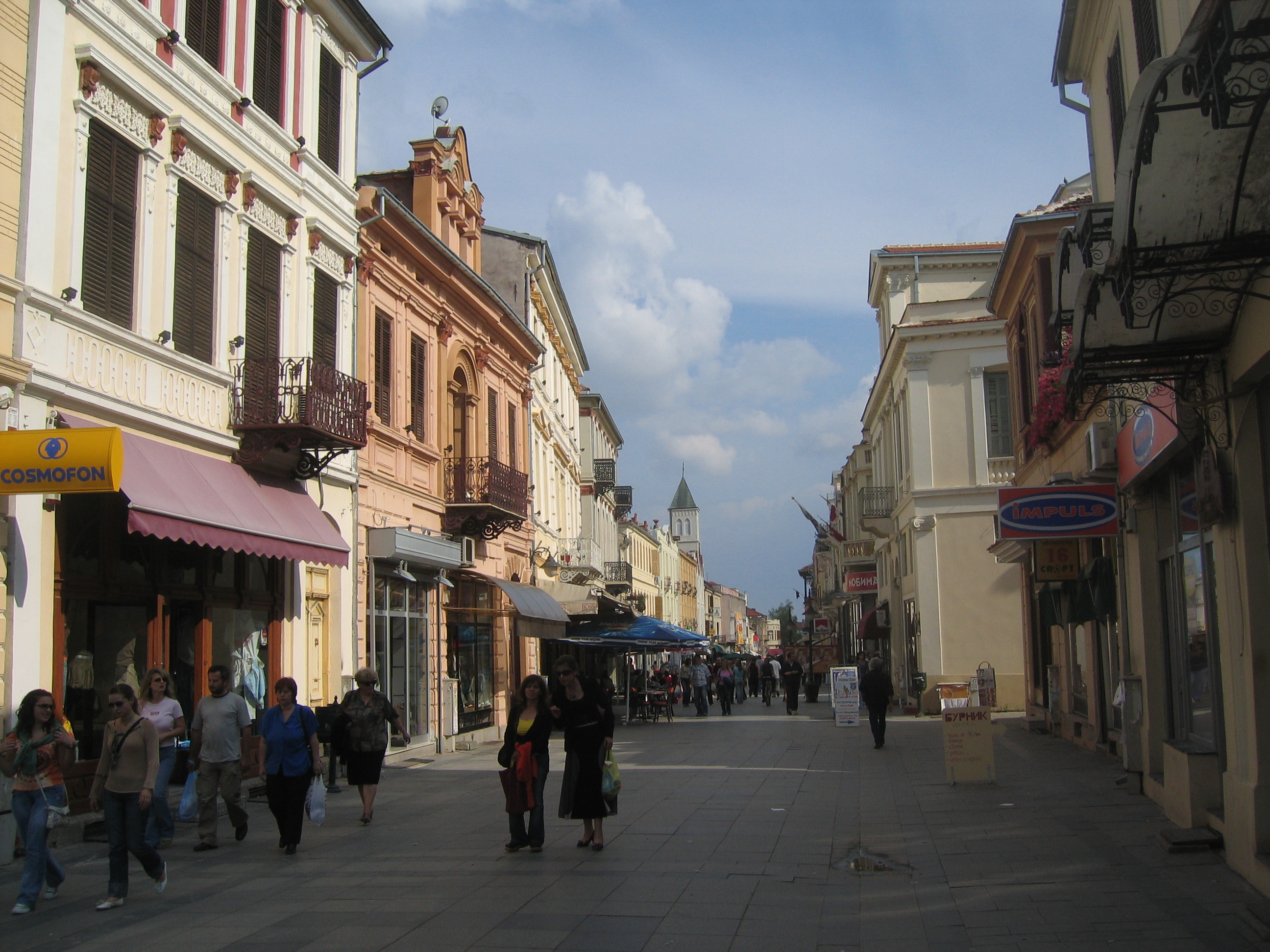

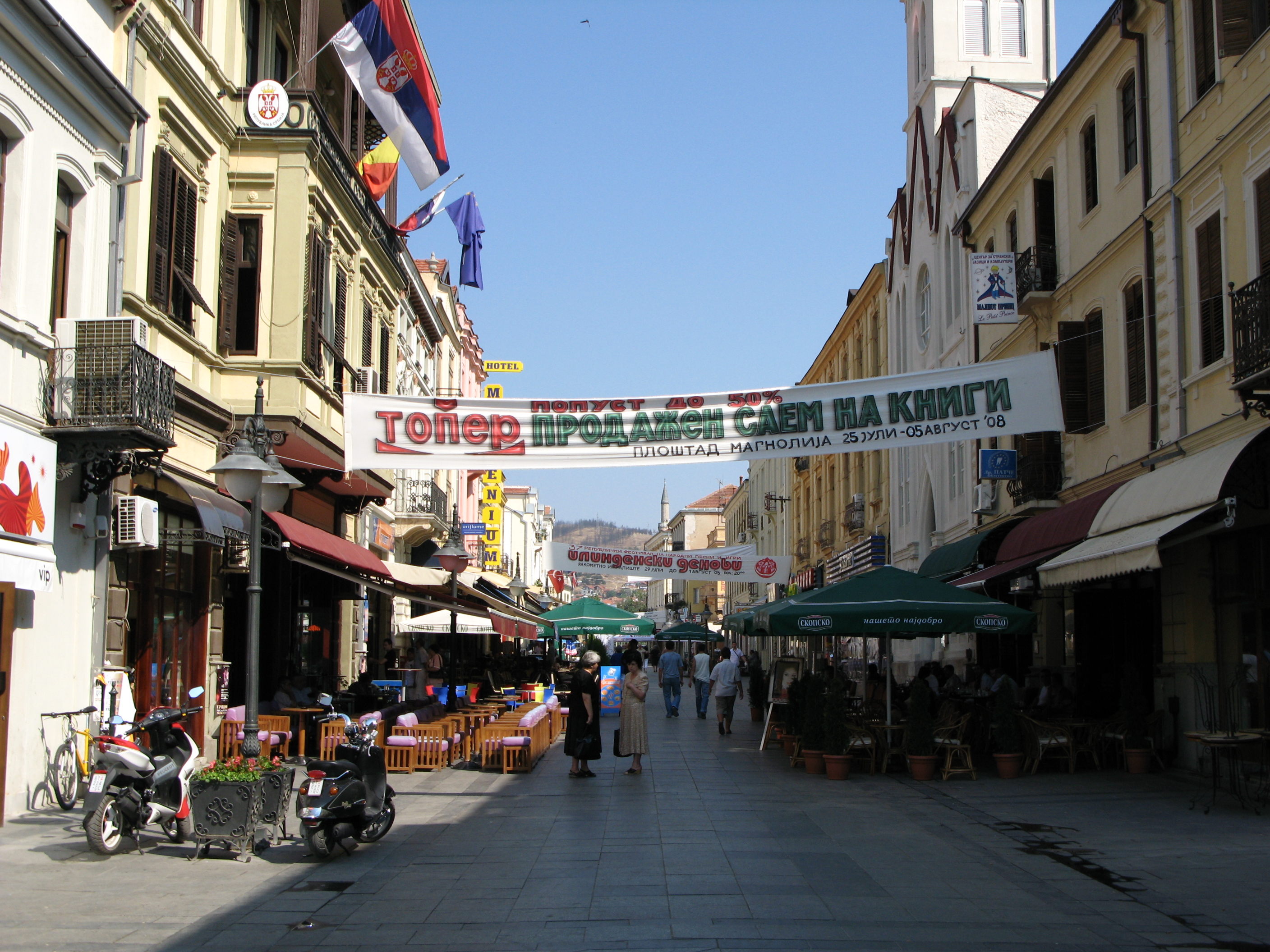

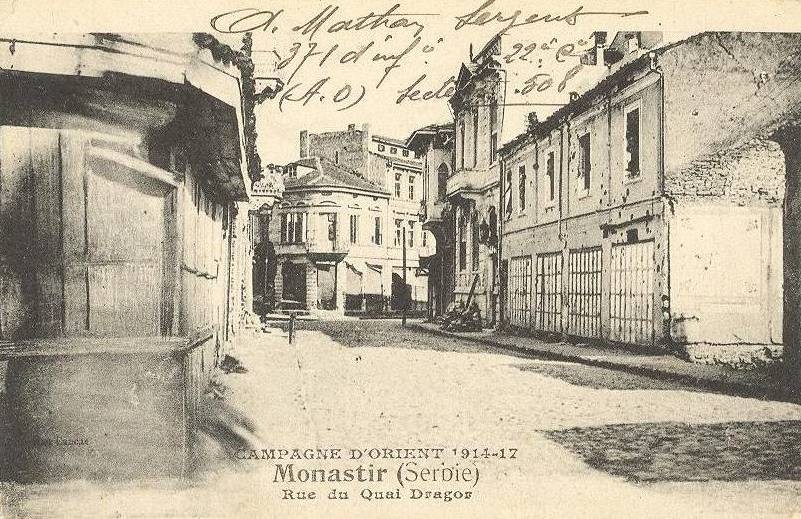
Širok Sokak in 1914, shortly after Manastır was ceded to Serbia by Turkey and renamed Bitola

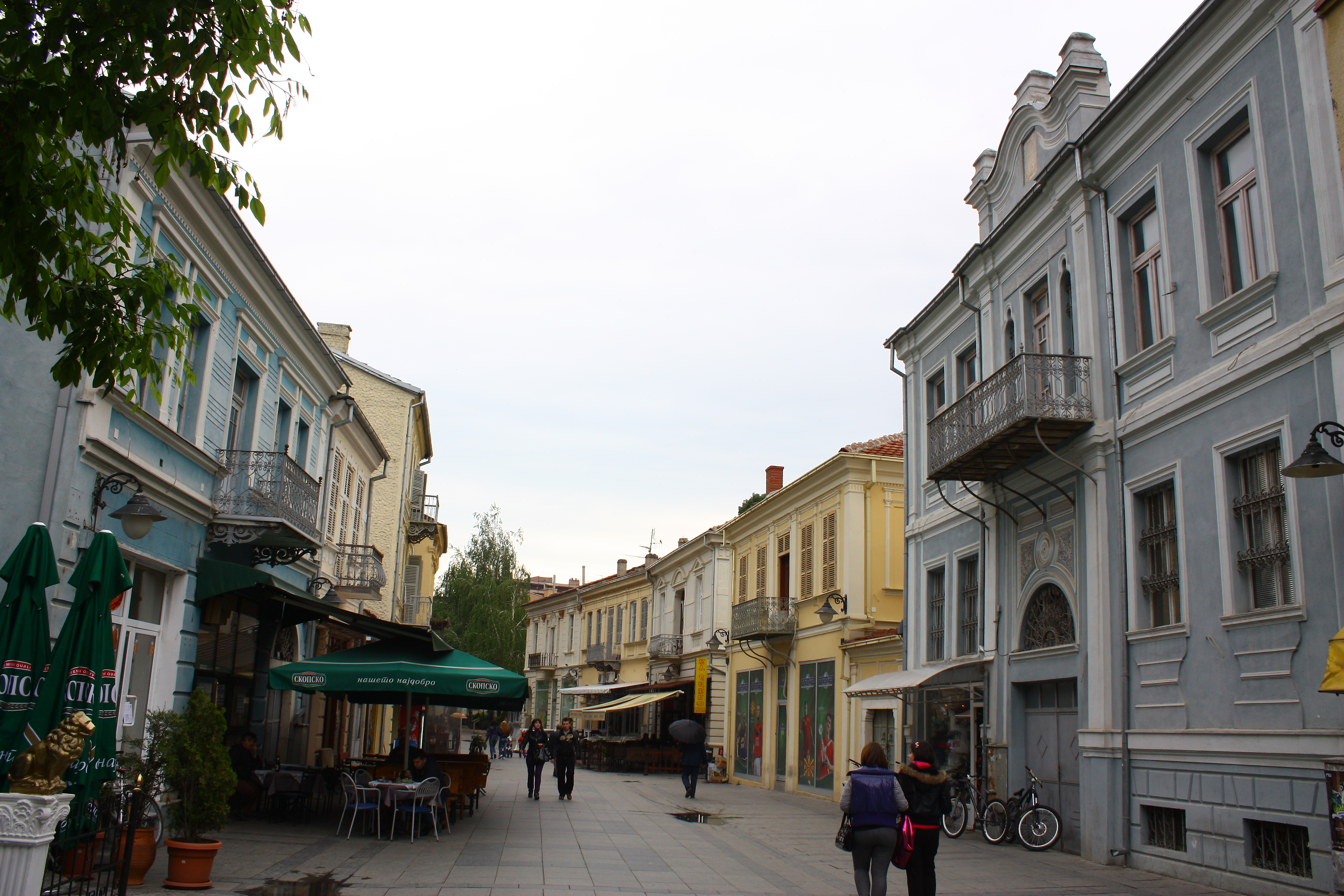
Typical architecture
