= Officers' Hall =

- Офицерски дом
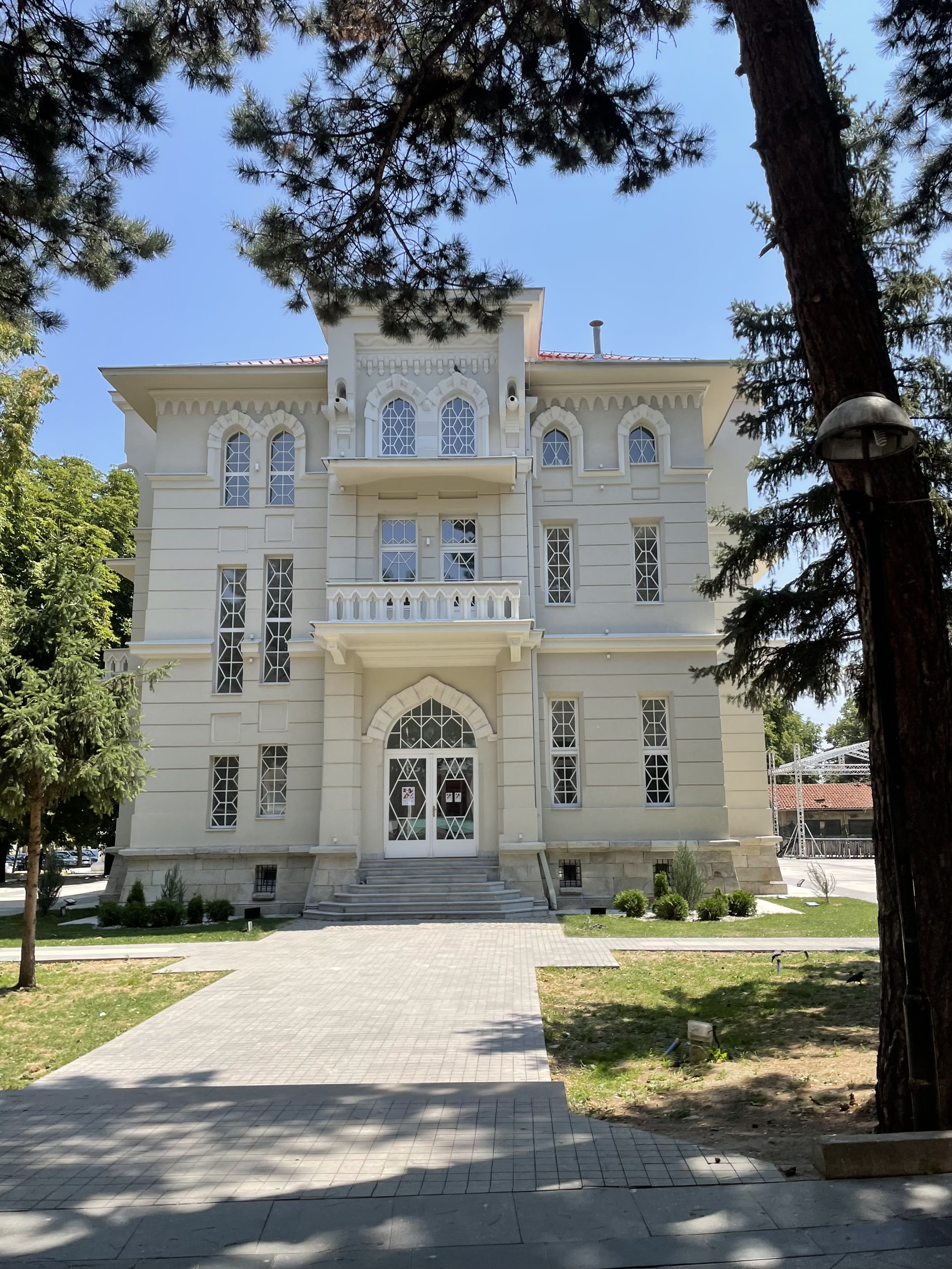
- The Officers' Hall in 2022, post-renovation

- Location within North Macedonia

General information
- Location: "Maršal Tito" no. 147, Bitola, North Macedonia
- Coordinates: 41°01′27″N 21°20′14″E
- Current tenants: Cultural-Informative Centre
- Groundbreaking: 1909
- Completed: 1919
- Renovated: 2021

Height
- Height: 17.3 m (57 ft)

The Officers' Hall (Macedonian: Офицерски дом, romanized: Oficerski dom) is a historic building located on Širok Sokak in Bitola, North Macedonia. Construction began before the end of Ottoman rule and concluded during Serbian rule. During the Yugoslav-era, it was used by the army and became known as the Yugoslav National Army House (Macedonian: Дом на ЈНА) and, after Macedonian independence, the Republic of Macedonia Army House (Macedonian: Дом на АРМ). It is a protected Object of Cultural Heritage by the Ministry of Culture, under the category of "great significance".

== History ==
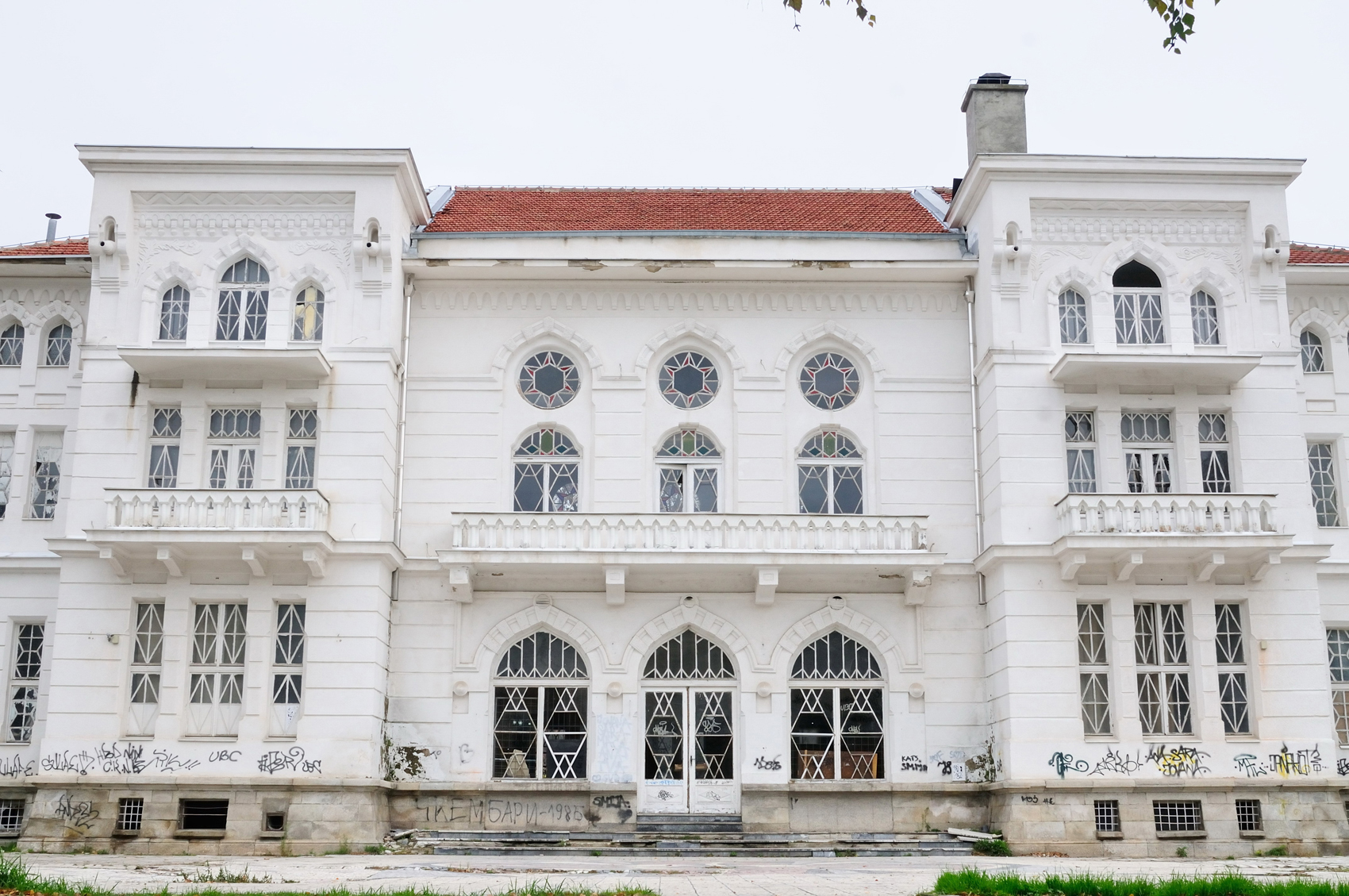
The Officers' Hall in 2014

=== Construction ===
There were likely two architects involved in the construction of the building: one from Vienna and one from Italy. Ukrainian architect Valeri Gusin may have also overseen construction. The construction workers were from the village of Smilevo. The building incorporates multiple architectural styles and was designed to resemble both a palace and a fortress.

=== Renovation ===
The building had fallen into disrepair by the 2010s after years of abandonment and was considered an embarrassment to Bitola. Plans to sell the building for private ownership were met with protest. It was finally fully renovated in 2021 at a cost of MKD 59 million (EUR 960,000), with funding provided by the municipality, the national government, and the EU. It is now under the jurisdiction of the Cultural-Informative Centre, to be used for cultural events, museum exhibitions, public ceremonies, debates, and private events.
