= Gazi Hajdar Kadi Mosque =

Mosque in Bitol, North Macedonia

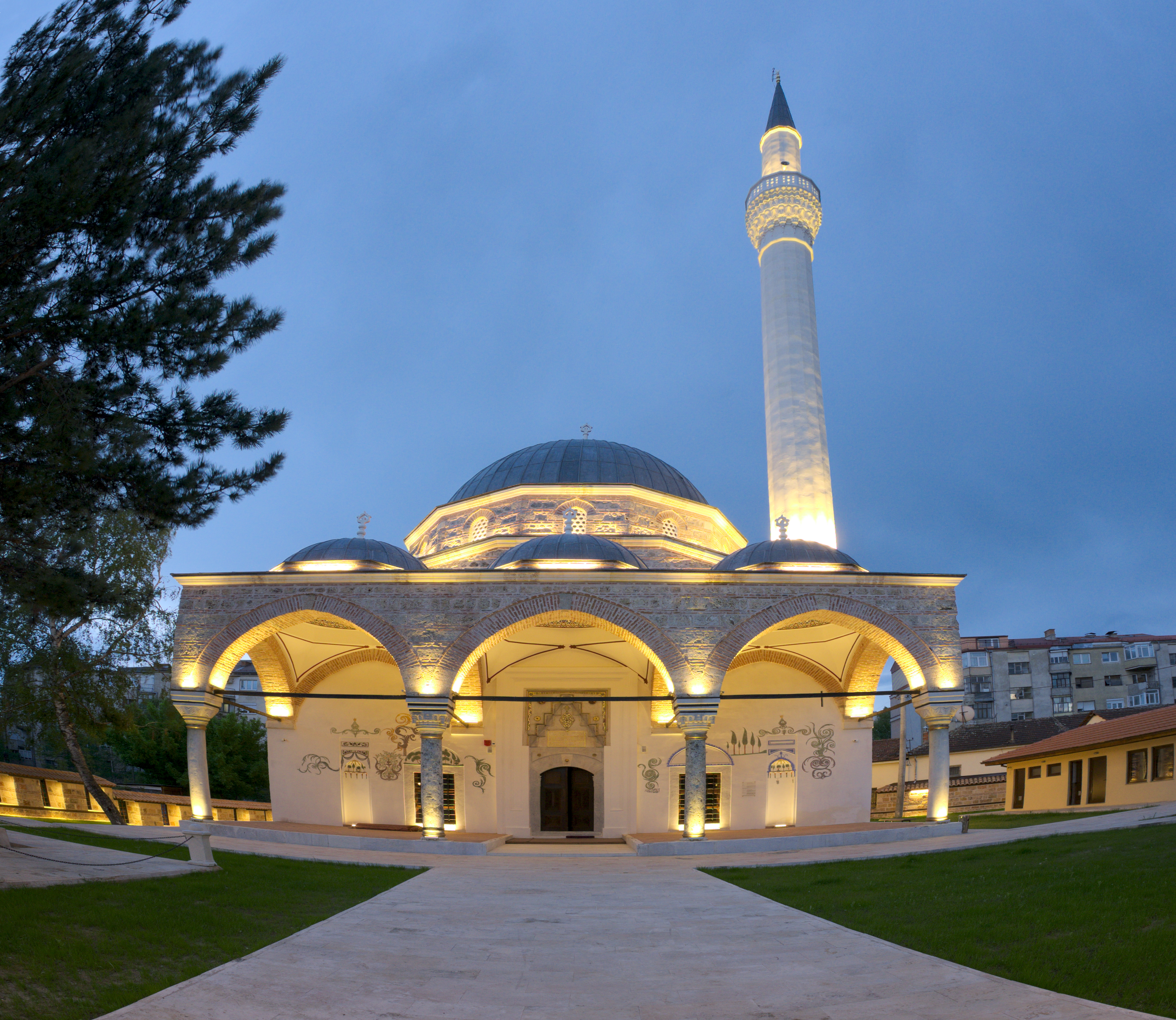

Religion
- Affiliation: Islam

Location
- Location: Bitola, North Macedonia
- Interactive map of Gazi Hajdar Kadi Mosque
- Coordinates: 41°2′5.97″N 21°20′18.51″E

Architecture
- Architect: Mimar Sinan
- Type: mosque
- Style: Classical period Ottoman Architecture
- Completed: 1561; 465 years ago

Specifications
- Length: 11 m (36 ft)
- Width: 11 m (36 ft)
- Minaret: 1
- Materials: Marble & Stone

The Gazi Hajdar Kadi Mosque, (Macedonian: Ајдар Кади Џамија, Ajdar Kadi Džamija; Albanian: Xhamia e Gazi Hajdar Kadiut, Turkish: Gazi Haydar Kadi Cami) is a mosque, situated in Bitola, North Macedonia. In the past the religious building has been transformed into a warehouse by the local Macedonian authorities. A thorough reconstruction was undergoing for several years with the assistance and cooperation of the Turkish Republic, and finally it was fully put into service and opened to public in November 2016.

== History ==
The mosque was commissioned by Haydar Bey, then beylerbey of Rumelia Eyalet, the largest Ottoman administrative territory, with Manastir as a regional centre. According to the inscription in Arabic on the stone plaque above the door, the mosque was built in 969 AH (1561/62 AD). The mosque is a domed building with massive walls of about 1.4 meters thick. The builders came from a small village in the region of Manastir but the project was most probably prepared by an unknown Islamic architect, influenced by the work of famous architects of that time, such as Kodja Sinan. In the description of Evliya Çelebi's travels through the Balkans in the 17th century, this mosque was considered as one of the most beautifully decorated. Study of the remains show that the Haydar-Kadi Mosque was the only mosque in Bitola with two minarets. Marble decorations adorn the mihrab and the triangle-shaped tromps. A stone bas-relief can be seen on the portal, capitals and on the mimbar. Colourful geometrical designs can be found around the windows, on the arches, as well as on the tromps. The wood-carved door is executed in bas-relief. The most distinctive motif is the stylized Arabic letter "elif'. This type of woodcarved doors can be seen in Istanbul mosques. The mosque was repaired in 1890. We also know that all the mosques of the town were restored before the visit of the Mehmed V in 1910, a fact confirmed by certain elements of the interior decoration painted at that time.

After the end of five centuries of Turkish rule in 1912, the mosque was abandoned. The lead from its dome was stolen and the dome was only restored in 1967. It was subsequently used as a packaging warehouse for a local distillery, then as a concert hall. In 2014, the mosque was completely renovated with funds from the Directorate General of Foundations (Turkey), which oversees the management of Islamic inalienable endowments (vakıf) dating back to the Ottoman era. The cost of renovations was more than 4.5 million lira. It reopened to worship on 4 November 2016 after a hiatus of 104 years.

== Gallery ==
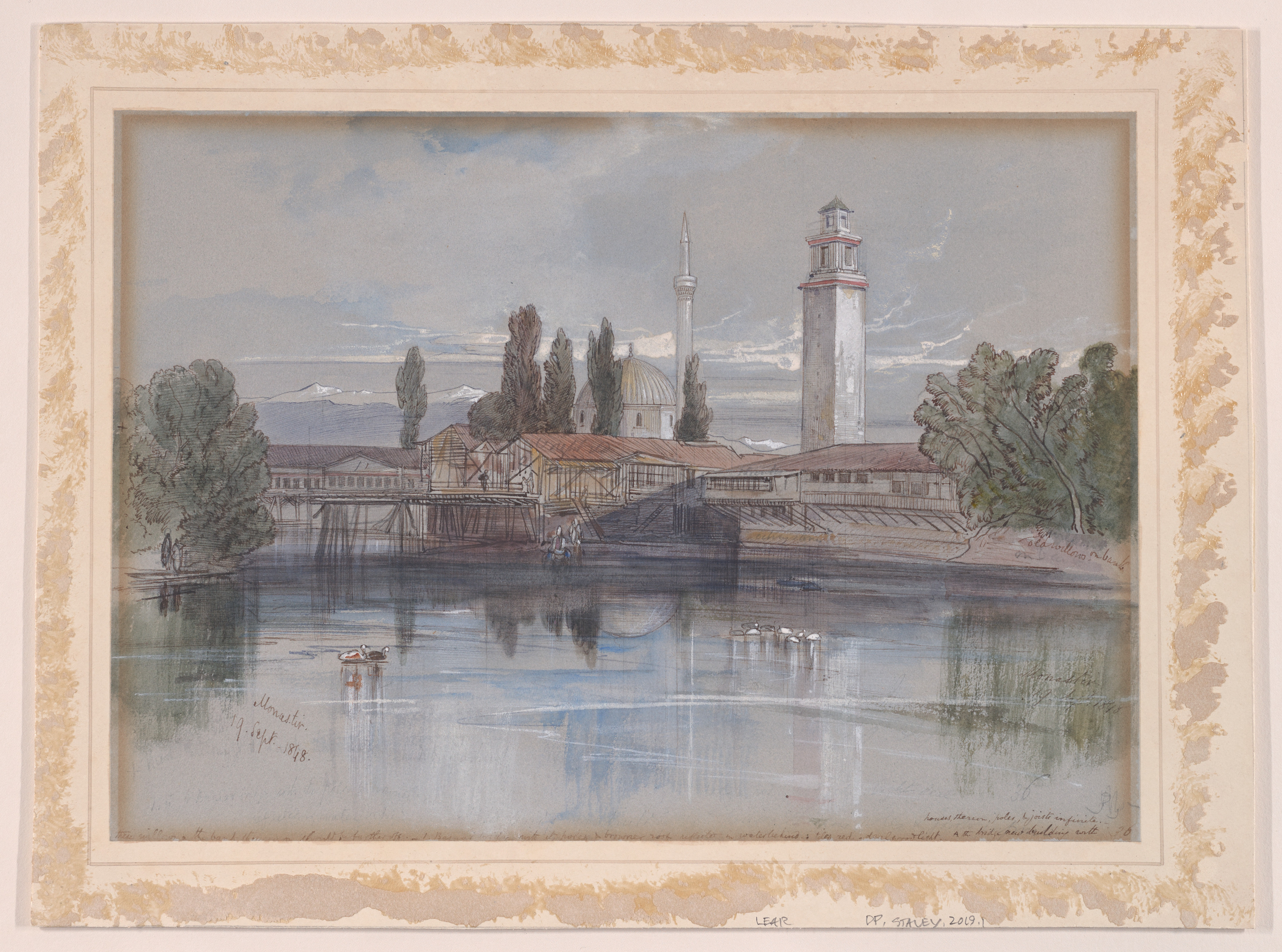
This 1848 painting of downtown Monastir (Bitola) by Edward Lear features the Gazi Hajdar Kadi Mosque and the Clock Tower.

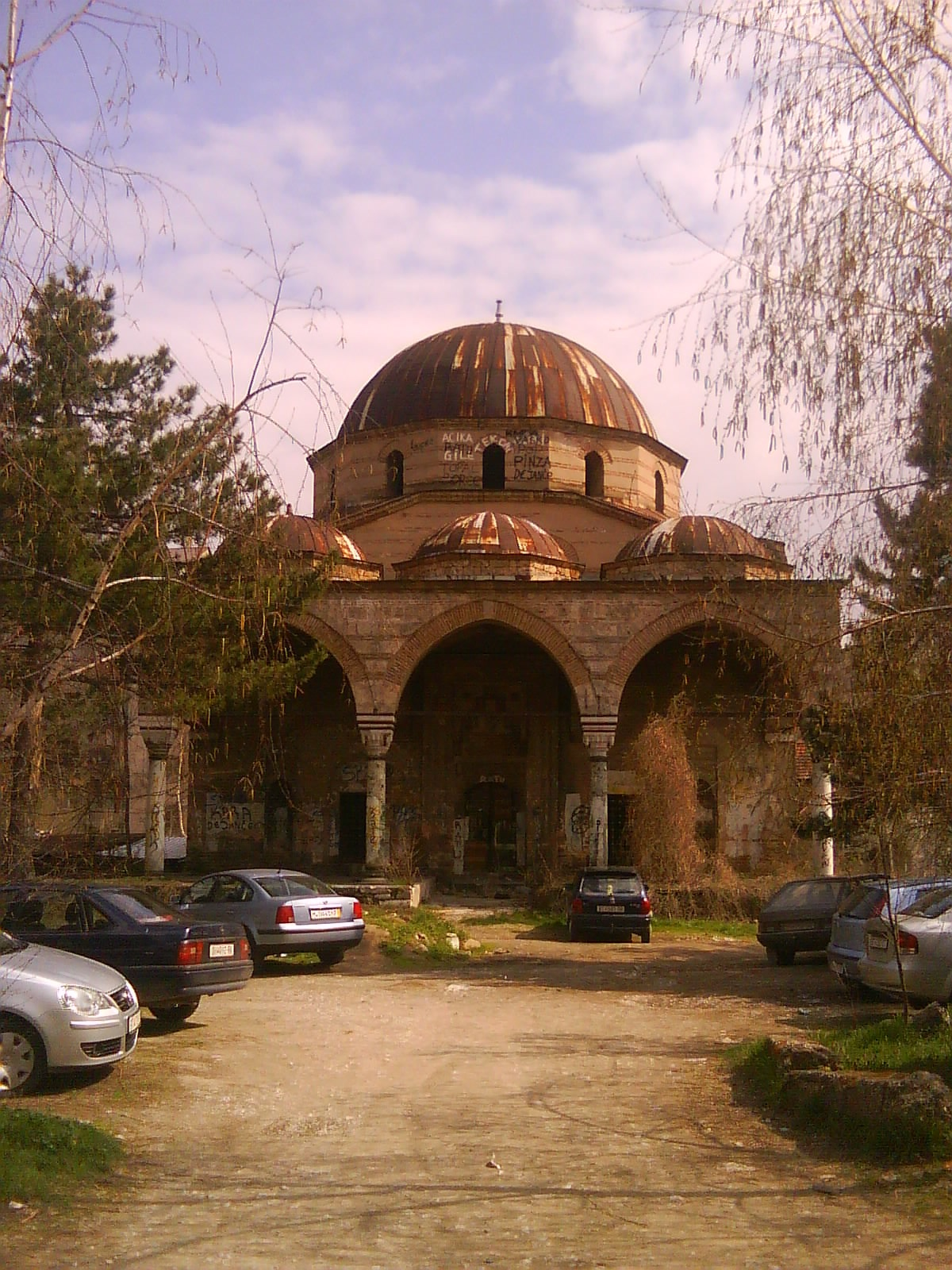
The mosque in 2011, before renovation.
