= Philip II Statue =

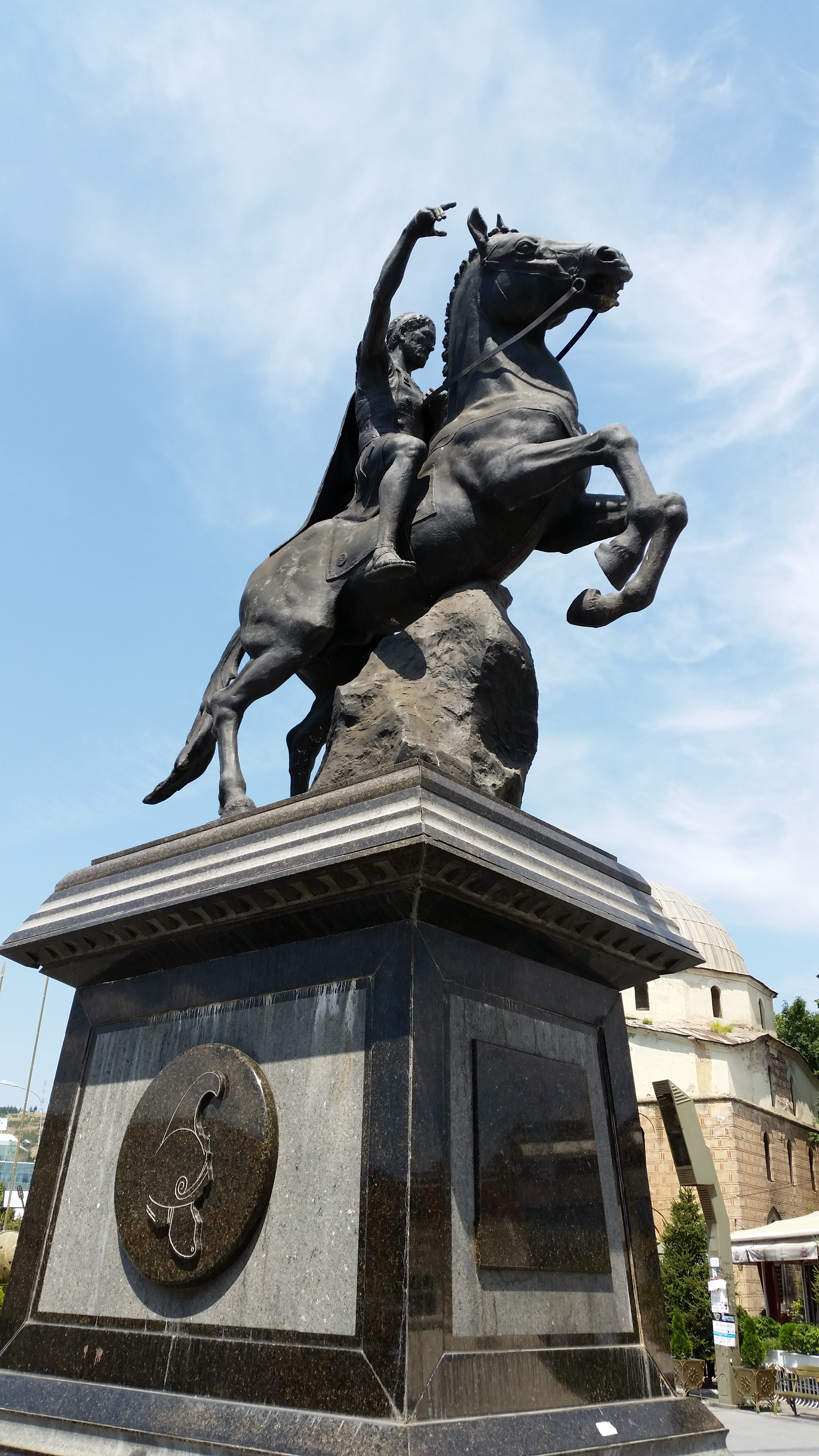
Philip II Statue

The Philip II Statue, officially The Founder of Heraclea Statue (name change to avoid conflict with Greece over history), is a large statue of the king Philip of Macedonia in the centre of the Macedonian city of Bitola, in Magnolia Square. Philip II was the founder of the ancient Macedonian city of Heraclea which was the forerunner of the present-day City of Bitola. The monument is 8.5 metres (27.9 feet) tall with Philip II perched on a horse. It is the work of sculptor Angel Korunovski. In the immediate vicinity of the memorial is a fountain which teams in the evening with synchronized music and light effects. The whole complex of the monument and fountain covers an area of the 600 square meter town square of Magnolia.

== Fountain ==
The fountain is made to look like a shield with the Vergina Sun, around the fountain has a more equal shields and spears. All around is surrounded by powerful speakers and at a certain time in the evening it' s giving the musical atmosphere that is part of the performance of the fountain. The shield of the fountain rises and turns while flushes water very high with interesting various lighting effects associated programming effects produced by numerous spotlights that are located around the fountain and inside the fountain.
