= Co-Cathedral of the Sacred Heart, Bitola =

Coordinates: 41°01′44″N 21°20′09″E

Co-Cathedral of the Sacred Heart
- Црква Пресвето Срце Исусово
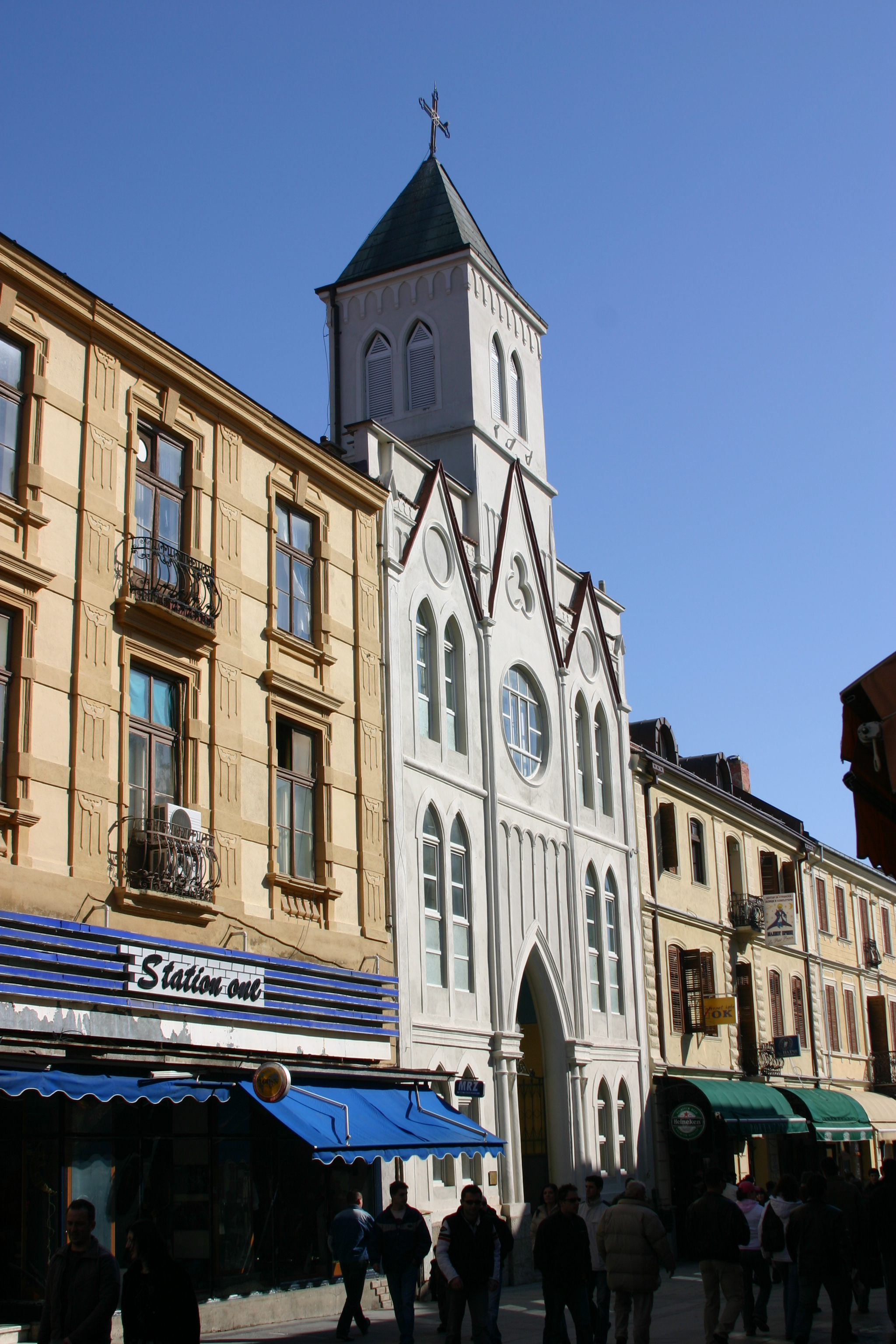
- Co-Cathedral of the Sacred Heart
- Location: Bitola
- Country: North Macedonia
- Denomination: Roman Catholic Church

The Co-Cathedral of the Sacred Heart (Macedonian: Црква Пресвето Срце Исусово, romanized: Crkva Presveto Srce Isusovo) is the name given to a religious building of the Catholic church that is located in the city of Bitola in North Macedonia and is the co-cathedral of the Diocese of Skopje.

== History ==
The establishment of the church dates back to the nineteenth century, by the Vincentians, who set out to spread the Catholic faith among the Orthodox population of the Ottoman Empire. The founder of the Church was Juan Jose Lepavek, who in 1857 bought a hotel from which to develop a future church, which was completed in 1870, but destroyed by fire in 1900. The present church dates from 1909 and is neo-Gothic style. The church tower was built between 1938 and 1940.

== Images ==
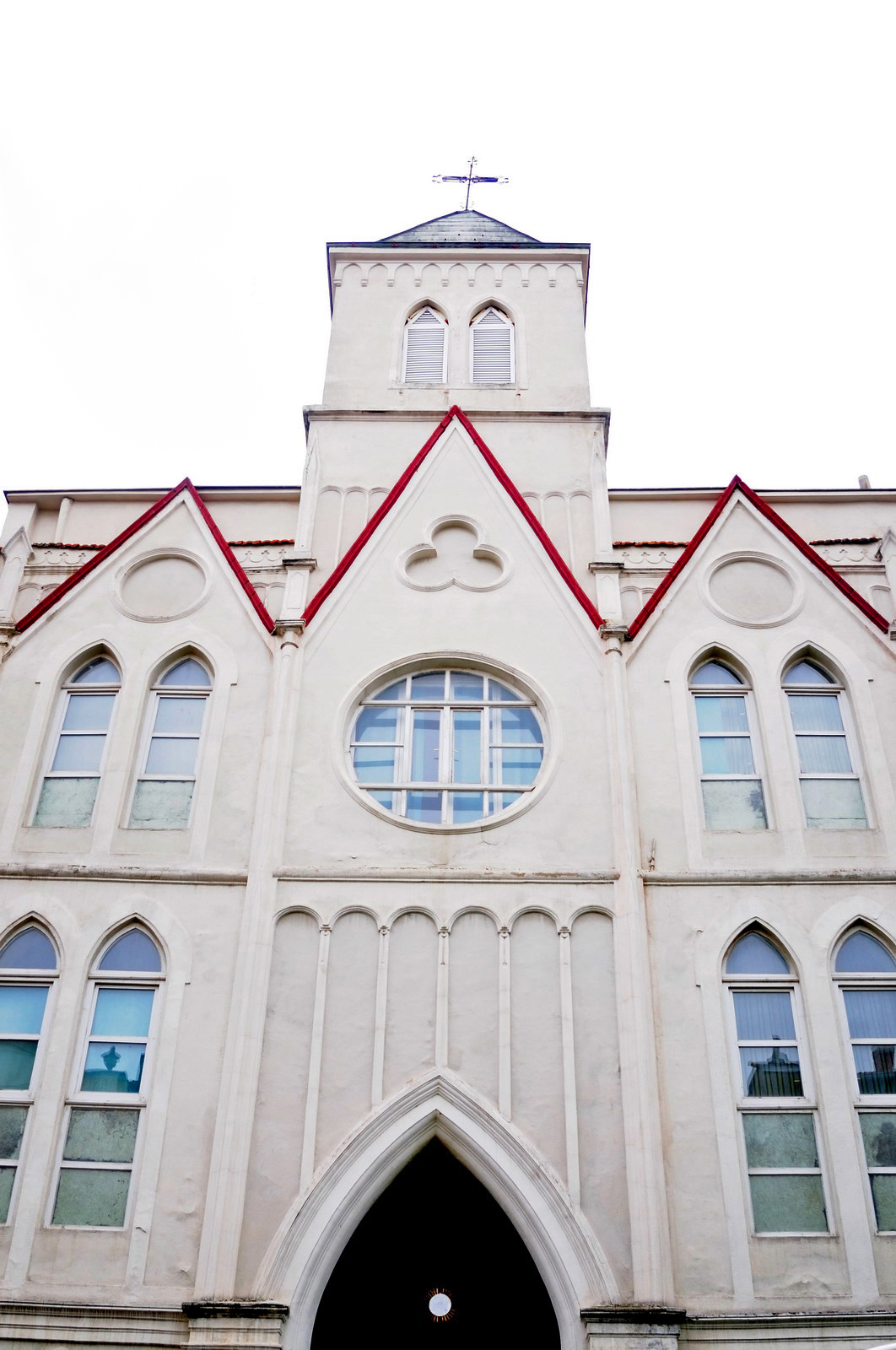
Frontal view of the facade

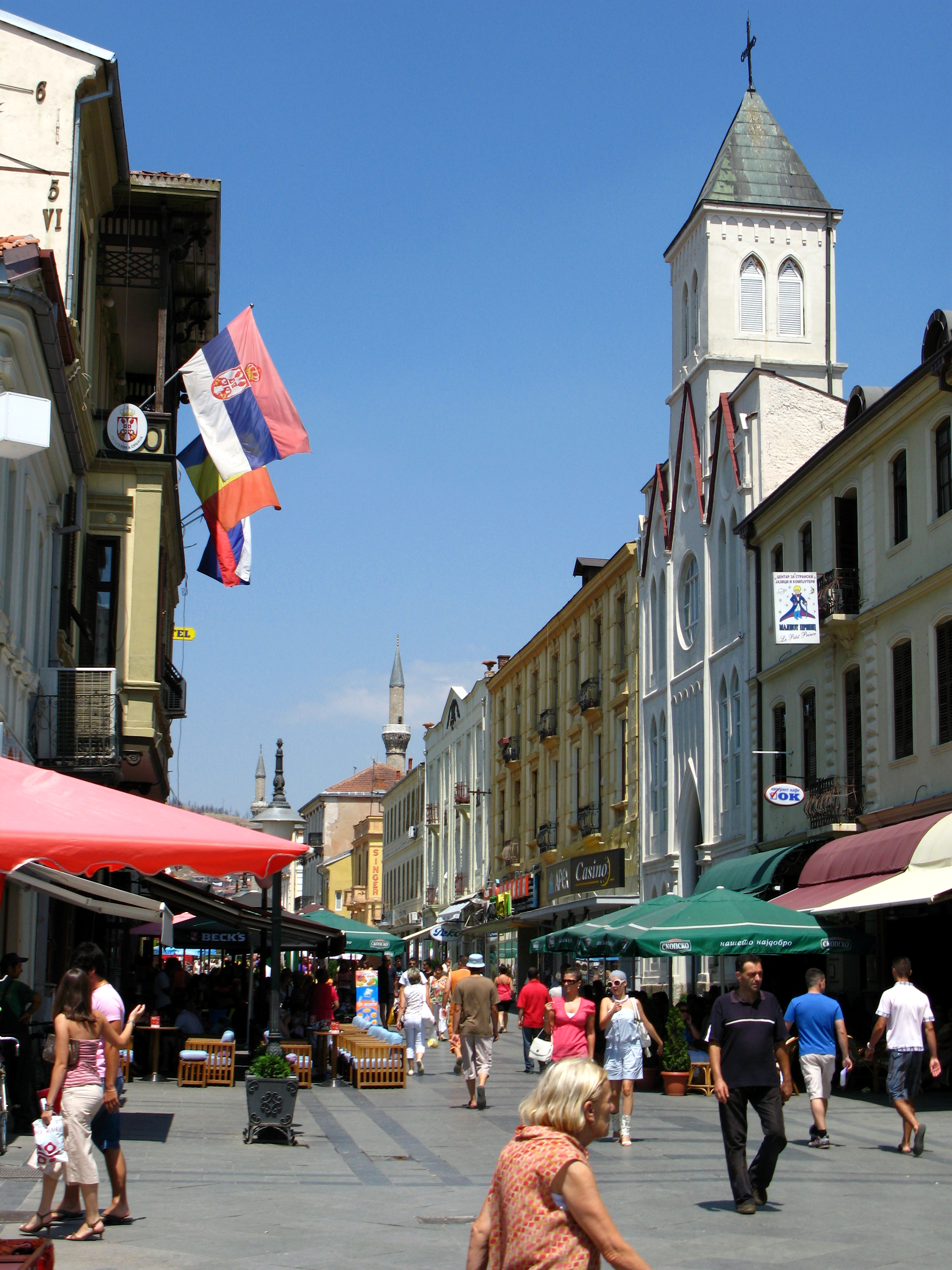
The church and its location in the pedestrian street Širok Sokak

The main portal leading to the church entrance

Interior view

== See also ==
- Roman Catholicism in North Macedonia
- Co-Cathedral of the Sacred Heart
