= Magnolia Square =

Square in Bitola, North Macedonia

- Public square
- {{{other_names}}}
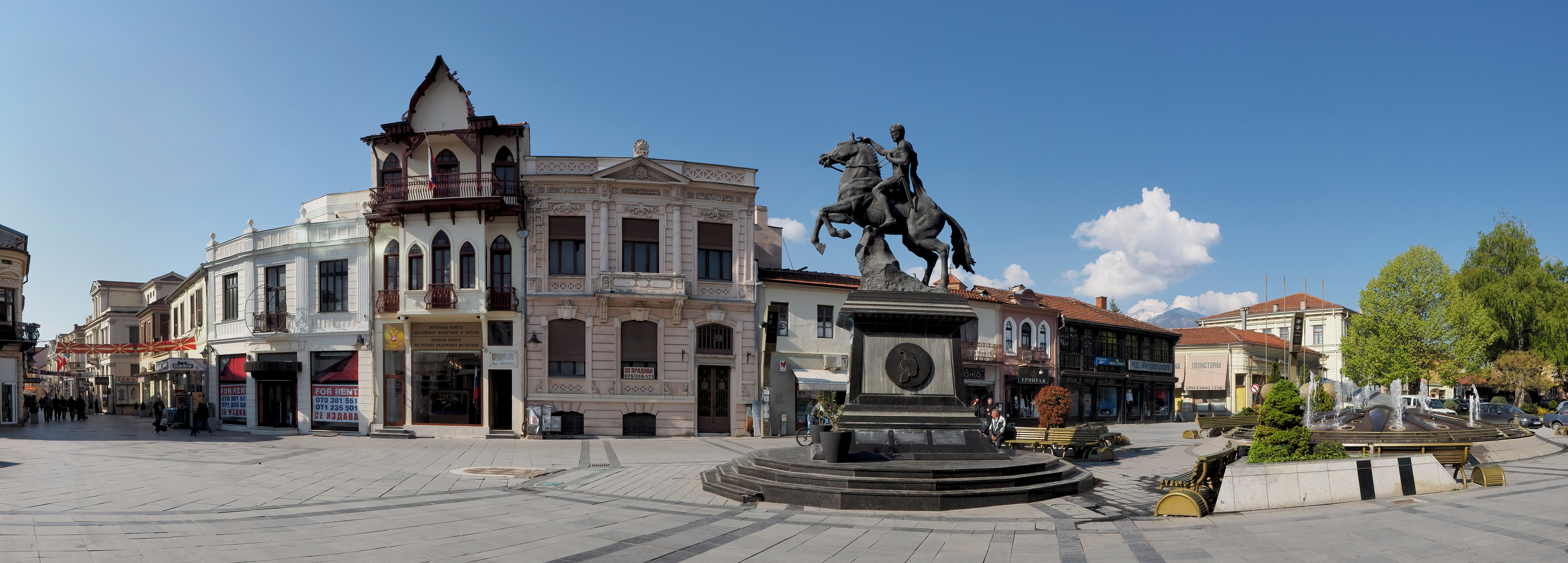
- Magnolia Square with the Philip II Statue
- Features: Statues Philip II Statue
- Surface: stone
- Location: Jorgo Osmano, City of Bitola, North Macedonia
- Location within North Macedonia
- Coordinates: 41.0301029°N 21.3350791°E

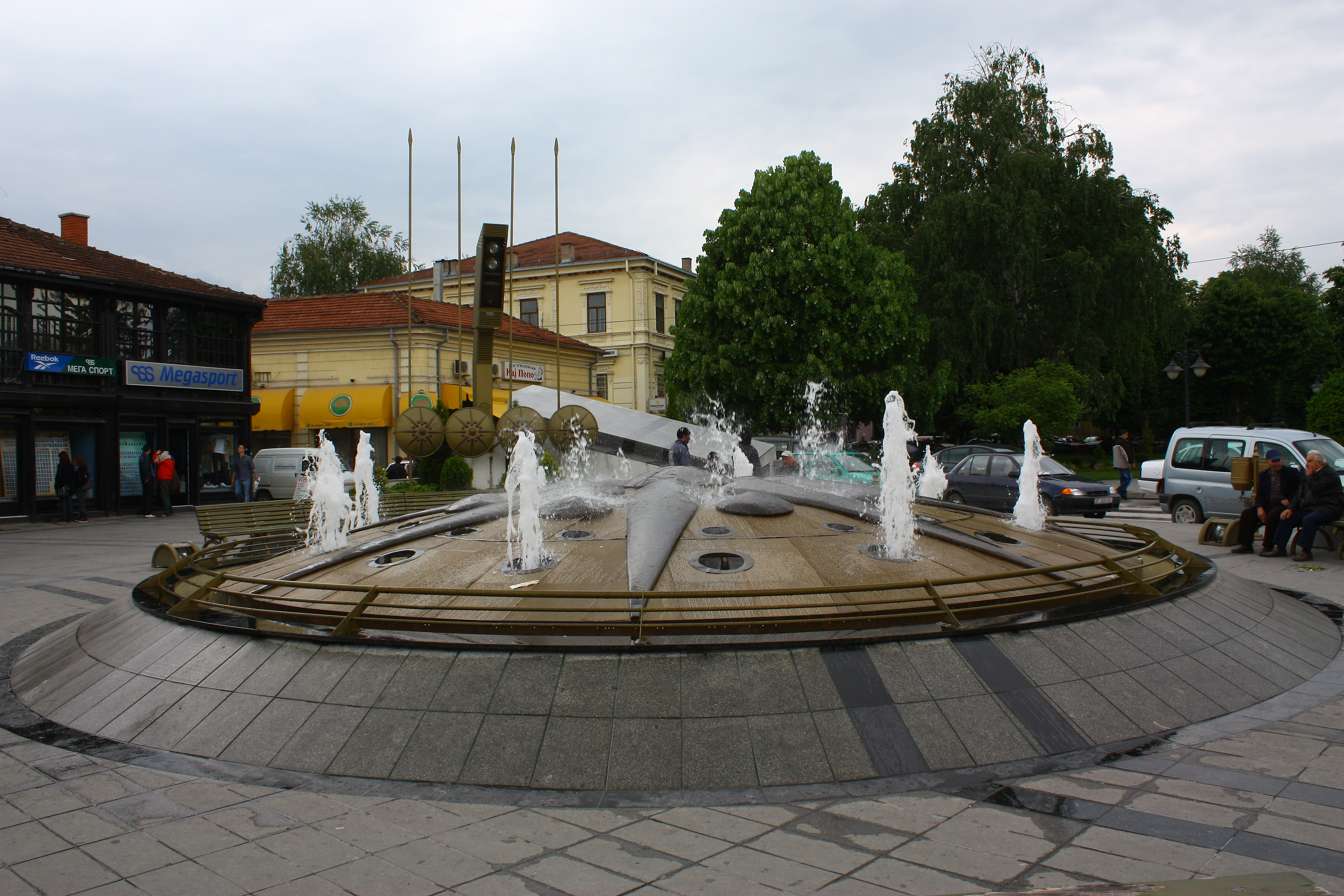
Vergina Sun fountain at the square

Magnolia Square (Macedonian: Плоштад Магнолија, romanized: Ploštad Magnolija) is a public space and a town square of the City of Bitola, located near the Clock Tower. Around the square are old houses from the Macedonian and Ottoman architecture that are purchased from various companies, firms and coffee bars. Bitola, which was a major cultural center in the Ottoman Empire has very interesting buildings from the Turks from which many on Main Street and Magnolia Square. Also there is an art gallery "Magaza" and the newly built "Glass Building". Bitola in cooperation with the Government of Macedonia made the monument The Founder of Heraclea Statue that is 8.5m high and around it a fountain with the Vergina Sun on it, and benches for sitting and resting.

== See also ==
- Town square
- Public place
