= Diocese of Kumanovo and Osogovo =

Diocese of Kumanovo and Osogovo Епархија Кумановско Осоговска
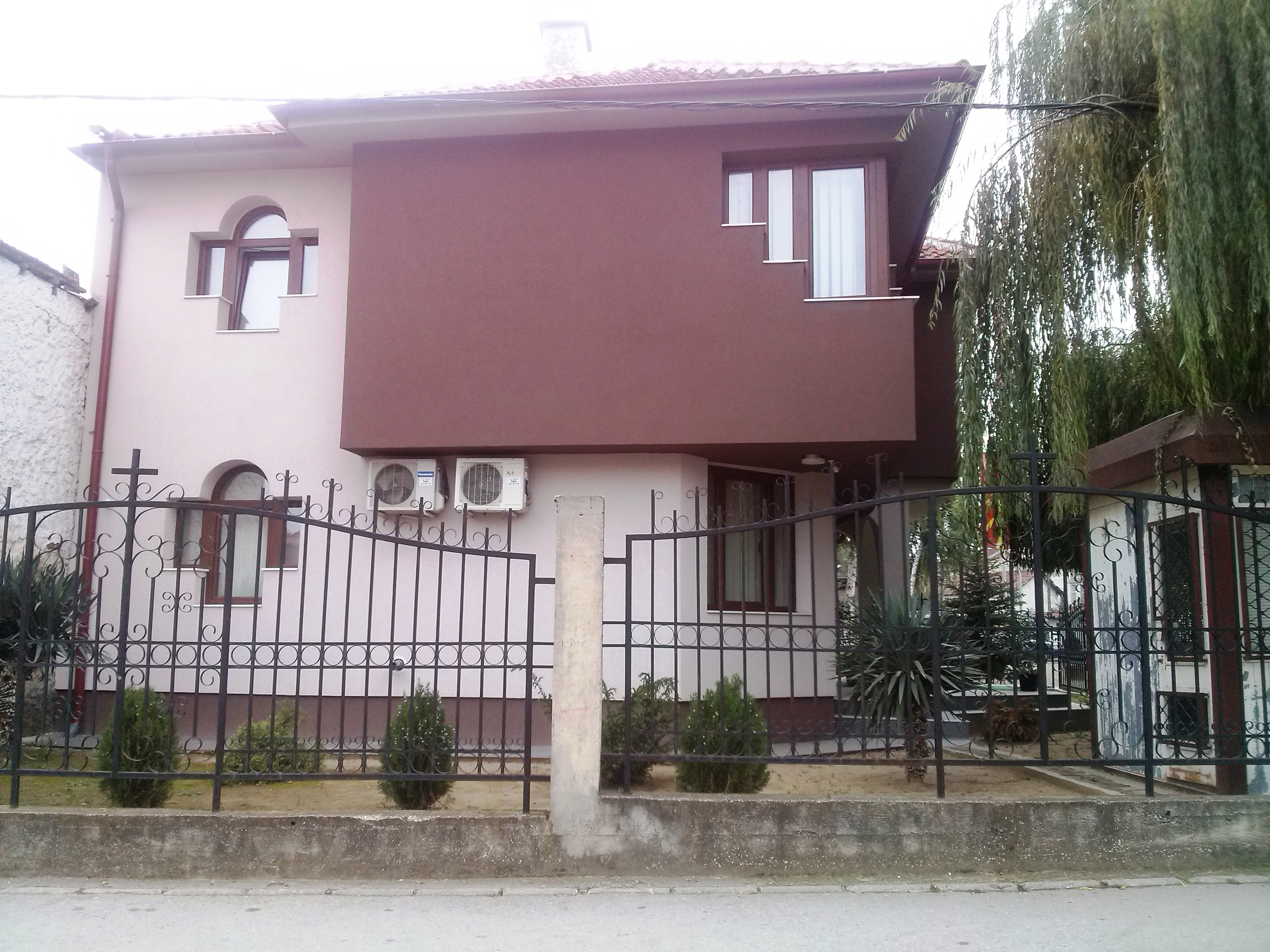
- The seat of Diocese Kumanovo and Osogovo

Location
- Territory: Kumanovo; Kratovo; Kriva Palanka; Rankovce; Lipkovo; Staro Nagorichane
- Headquarters: Kumanovo, North Macedonia

Information
- Denomination: Eastern Orthodox
- Established: 2013
- Language: Church Slavonic; Macedonian

Current leadership
- Bishop: Joseph

Website
- website

Dioceses of the Macedonian Orthodox Church en (2013-present)

Diocese of Kumanovo and Osogovo is a diocese of the Macedonian Orthodox Church in North Macedonia. It is headed by Metropolitan Josif.

== Deaneries ==
- Kumanovo-Kratovo Deanery
- Kriva Palanka Deanery

== List of Orthodox Churches ==
Macedonian cross

=== Kumanovo ===
Type	Name of church, monastery	location
Church	St. Dimitrija	Bajlovce
Church	St. Petka	Bedinje
Monastery	St. George	Beljakovce
Church	St. Nicholas	Beljakovce
Monastery	St. George	Biljanovce
Church	Holy Trinity	Brzak
Church	Holy Trinity	Buchinci
Church	St. Bogorodica	Bujkovci
Church	Holy Trinity	Chelopek
Church	Holy Trinity	Chetirce
Monastery	St. Arhangels Muhail and Gavril	Deljadrovce
Church	St. Bogorodica	Deljadrovce
Monastery	St. George	Deljadrovce
Monastery	St. Petka and Holy Sunday	Deljadrovce
Monastery	St. Theotokos	Deljadrovce
Church	St. Zlata Magdalenska	Deljadrovce
Monastery	St. Zlata Magdalenska	Deljadrovce
Church	Holy Spirit	Dobracha
Church	St. George	Dobroshane
Church	Ascension of Jesus	Dovezence
Church	St. George	Dovezence
Church	St. Jovan	Dragomance
Church	St. Nikolas	Drenak
Church	St. Petka	Gabresh
Church	St. Bogorodica	Gorno Konjare
Church	St. Bogorodica	Gorno Konjari
Church	St. George	Gradishte
Monastery	St. George	Gradishte
Church	St. George	Kanarevo
Monastery	St. Theotokos	Karpino
Church	St. Archangel Michael	Karposh
Church	St. George	Klechovce
Church	St. Atanasie	Kokoshinje
Church	St. Nikolas	Kolicko
Church	St. George	Konjuh
Church	St. Nikolas	Kshenje
Church	Holy Trinity	Kumanovo
Monastery	St. George	Kumanovo
Church	St. Nikolas	Kumanovo
Church	Resurrection of Christ	Kumanovo
Church	Holy Trinity	Lopate
Church	St. Jovan	Makresh
Church	Ascension of Jesus	Matejche
Church	St. Petka	Matejche
Monastery	St. Theotokos	Matejche
Church	St. Elijah	Miladinovci
Church	St. Bogorodica	Mlado Nagorichane
Church	St. George	Mlado Nagorichane
Church	St. Petka	Mlado Nagorichane
Church	Ascension of Jesus	Mrchevci
Church	St. Petka	Murgash
Church	St. Elijah	Nikuljane
Church	St. Nikolas	Novo Selo
Church	St. Nikolas	Oblavci
Church	St. Nikolas	Orah
Monastery	St. Theotokos	Orah
Church	St. Bogorodica	Orasac
Monastery	St, Ijaija	Orashac
Church	St. Nikolas	Orashac
Church	St. Nikolas	Pavleshence
Church	St. Bogorodica	Pchilnja
Church	Ascension of Jesus	Pchinja
Church	St. George	Pelince
Church	St. Petka	Pezovo
Church	St. Mina	Proevce
Church	Holy Trinity	Rechica
Church	St. Jovan	Rezhanovce
Church	Ascension of Jesus	Romanovce
Church	St. Bogorodica	Romanovce
Church	St. Petka	Rugjince
Church	Ascension of Jesus	Shupli Kamen
Monastery	Holy Trinity	Skachkovce
Monastery	Holy Trinity	Skachkovce
Church	St. Jovan	Skachkovce
Church	St. Nikolas	Srezovce
Church	St. George	Staro Nagorichane
Monastery	St. Jovan Blagoslov	Strezovce
Monastery	St. Jovan Blagoslov	Strezovce
Monastery	St. Prohor Pshinski	Strezovce
Monastery	St. Prohor Pshinski	Strezovce
Monastery	St. Atanasie	Studena Bara
Church	St. Bogorodica	Studena Bara
Church	St. Nikolas	Sushica
Church	St. Petka	Tabanovce
Church	St. George	Tromegja
Church	St. Nikolas	Umin Dol
Church	St. Nikolas	Vince
Monastery	St. Theotokos	Zabel
Church	St. George	Zhegljane
Church	St. Elijah	Zivenje
Church	Holy Sunday	Zubovce

=== Kriva Palanka ===
Type	Name of church, monastery	location
Church	St. Dimitrija	Kriva Palanka
Church	St. Teodor Tirin	Konopnica
Church	Holy Trinity	Mokjdivnjak
Church	St. Nikolas	Psacha
Church	St. Nikolas	Opila
Church	St. Nikolas	Ginovce
Church	St. George	Petrlica
Church	St. Voznesenie	Dlabochica
Church	St. Nikolas	Gradec
Church	St. Propher Eliaja	Luke
Church	St. Nikolas	Trnovo
Church	St. Bogorodica	Rankovci
Church	St. Petka Paraskeva	Radibuzh
Church	St. Jovan	Otoshnica
Church	Holy Trinity	German
Monastery	St. Joakim Osogovski	Kriva Palanka
Church	St. Elaija	Gilince
Church	St. Petka	Luke
Church	St. Dimitrija	Dubrovnica
Church	St. Marko	Nerav
Church	St. John the Baptist	Nerav
Church	St. Paul	Ginovce
Church	St, John the Baptist	Milutinci

=== Kratovo ===
Type	Name of church, monastery	location
Monastery	St. Elijah	Filipovci
Monastery	St. Petka	Kavrak
Church	St. Antonie	Ketenovo
Monastery	St. Jovan	Kozhuh
Church	St. Jovan	Kratovo
Church	St. Nikolas	Kratovo
Church	St. George	Kratovo
Church	St. George	Kuklicica
Church	St. Sava	Muzkovo
Monastery	St. Zlata Magdalenska	Nekjevo
Church	St. George	Prikovci
Church	St. Petka	Prikovci
Church	St. Haralampie	Sekulica
Church	St. Haralampie	Sekulica
Church	St. Petka	Sekulica
Monastery	Holy Trinity	Sekulica
Church	St. Vovedenie	Shlegovo
Church	St. Elijah	Shlegovo
Church	St. Nikolas	Shopsko Rudare
Monastery	St. Elijah	Shopsko Rudare
Church	St. Nikolas	Sozhuh
Church	St. Dimitrija	Stracin
Church	Holy Trinity	Tatomir
Church	Resurrection or Sunday	Trnovac
Monastery	Holy Trinity	Trnovac
Church	St. Jovan	Turalevo
Church	St. Petka	Turalevo
Monastery	Holy Sinday	Turalevo
Church	St. Konstantin and Elena	Vakav
Church	St. Nikolas	Zheleznica

== List of Orthodox Monasteries ==
Osogovo Monastery near Kriva Palanka
Karpino Monastery near village Suvi Orah, Staro Nagorichane
George the Trophy-bearer in Staro Nagorochane
Psacha Monastery, village Psacha, Rankovce
Matejche Monastery, village Matejche, Lipkovo

== Picture gallery ==
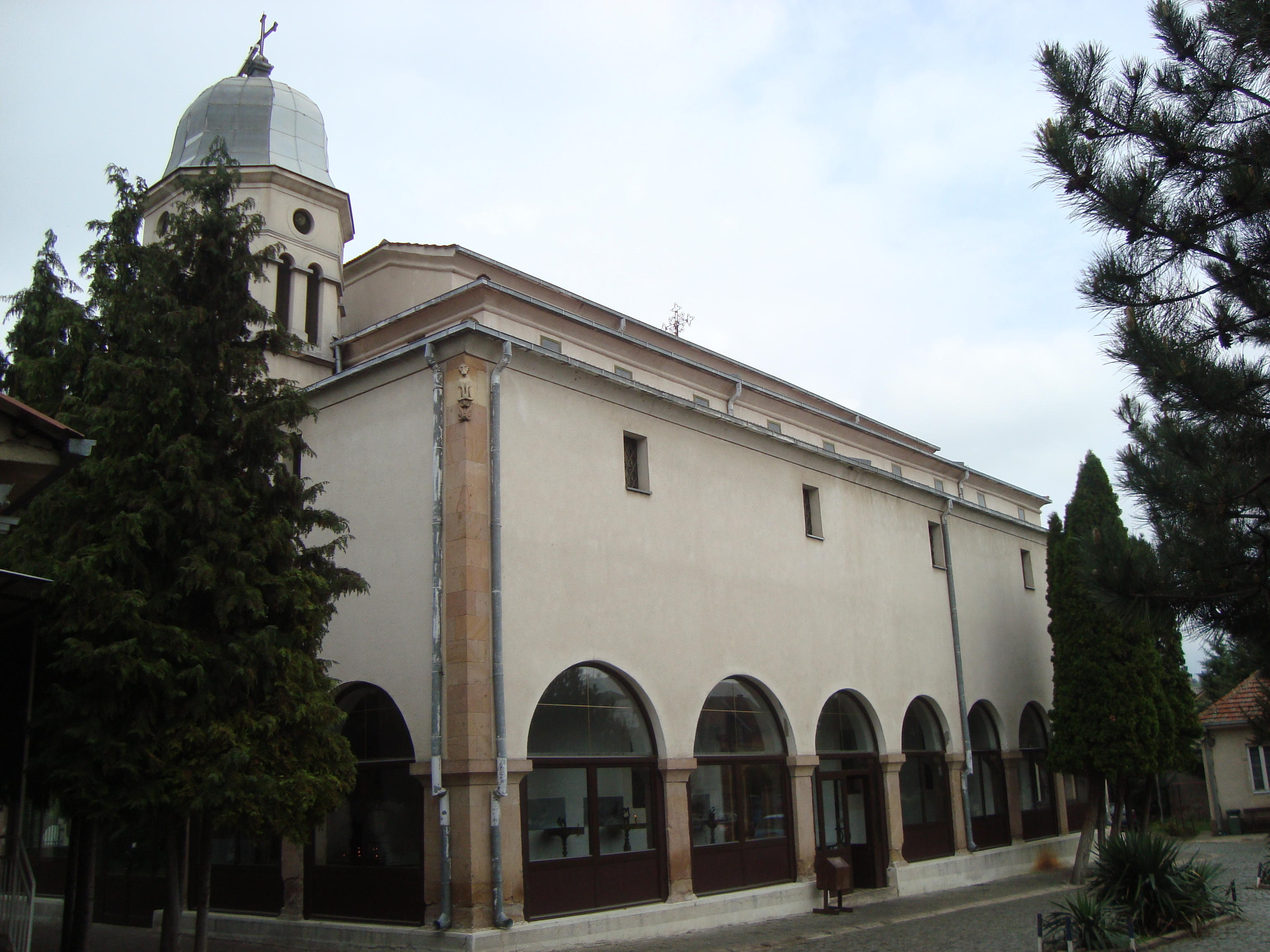
St. Nikola, Kumanovo

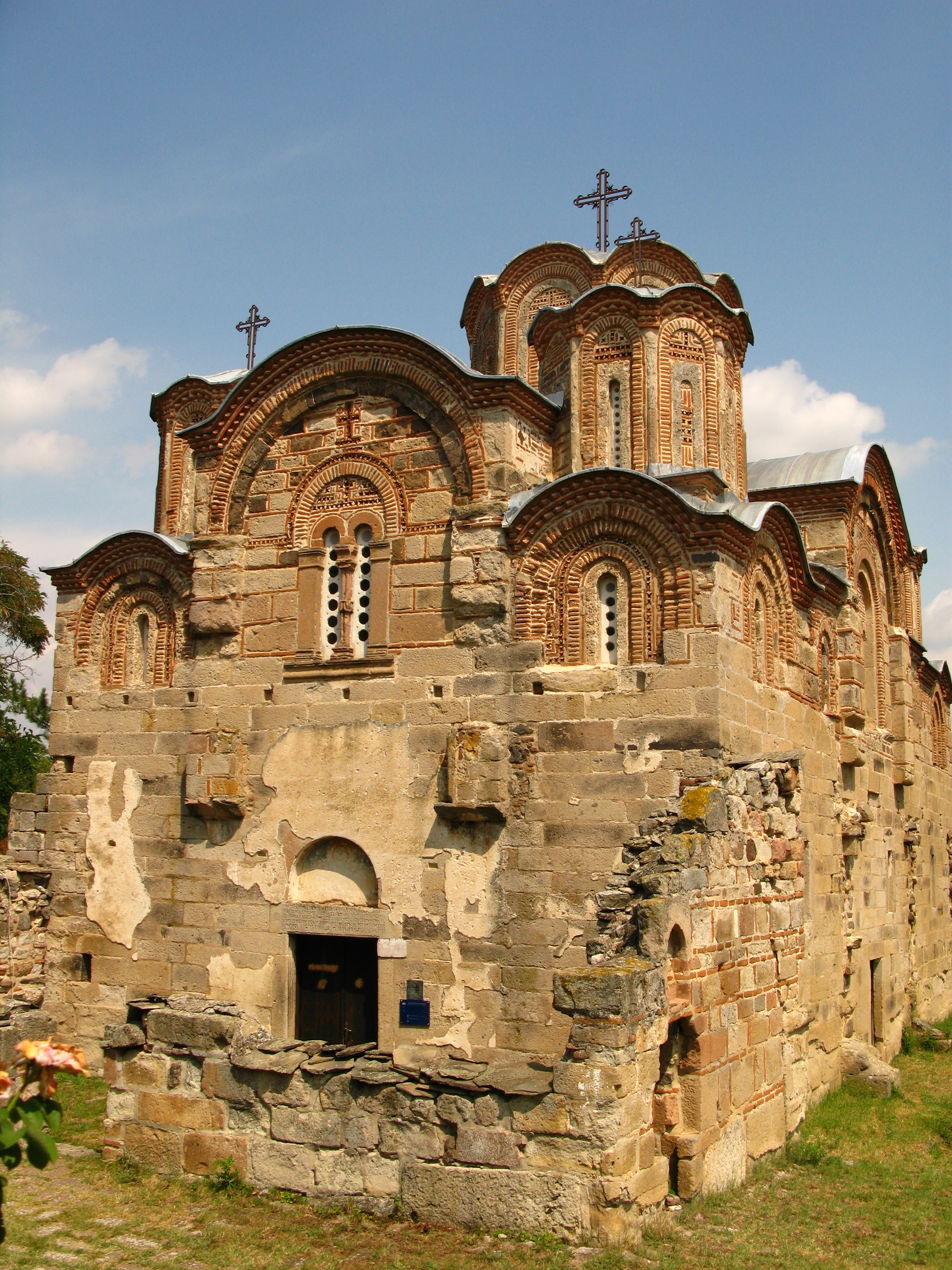
St. George, Staro Nagorichane

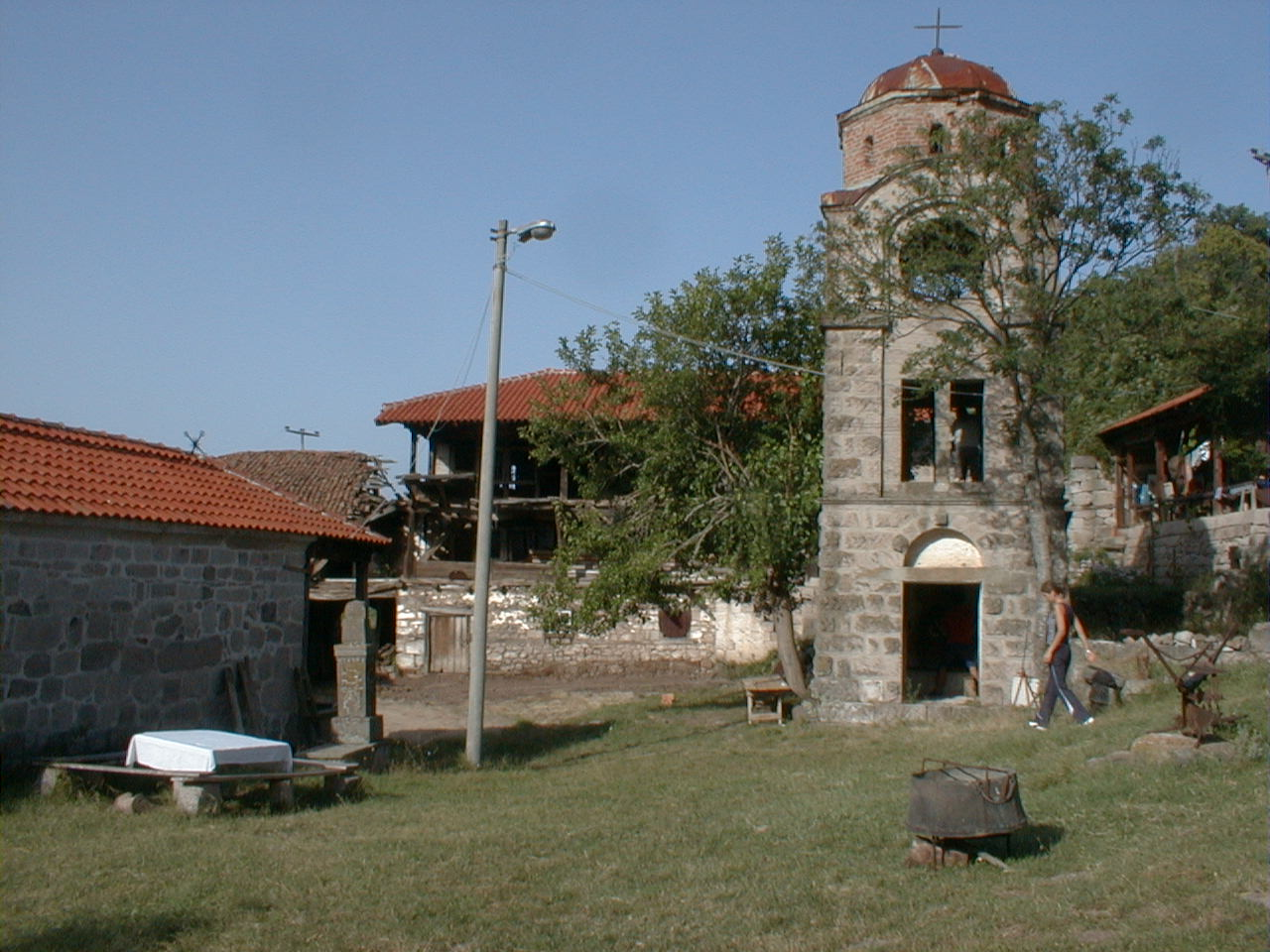
Karpino Monastery, Suv Orah, Staro Nagorichane

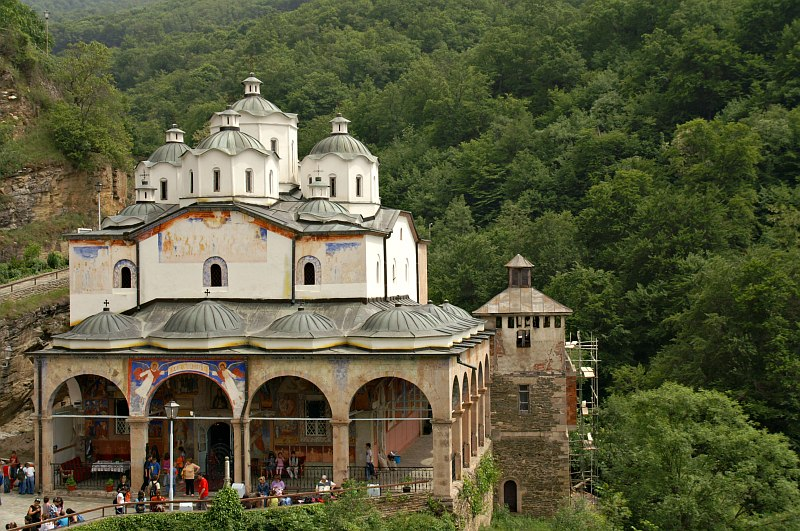
St. Joakim Osogovski Monastery, Kriva Palanka

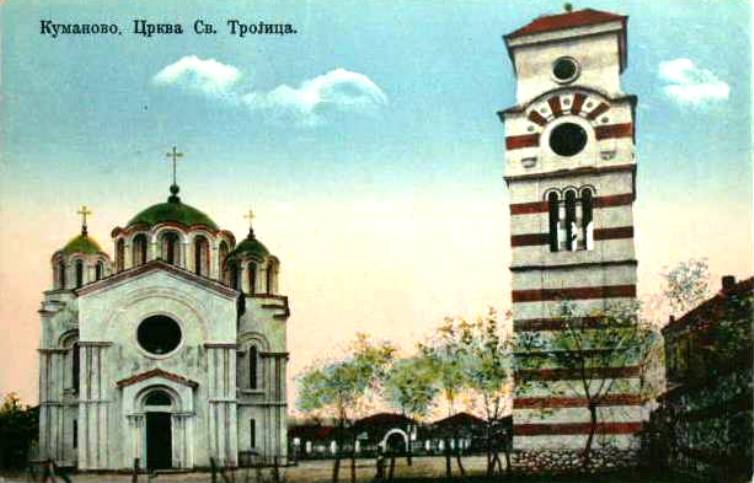
Holy Trinity, Kumanovo

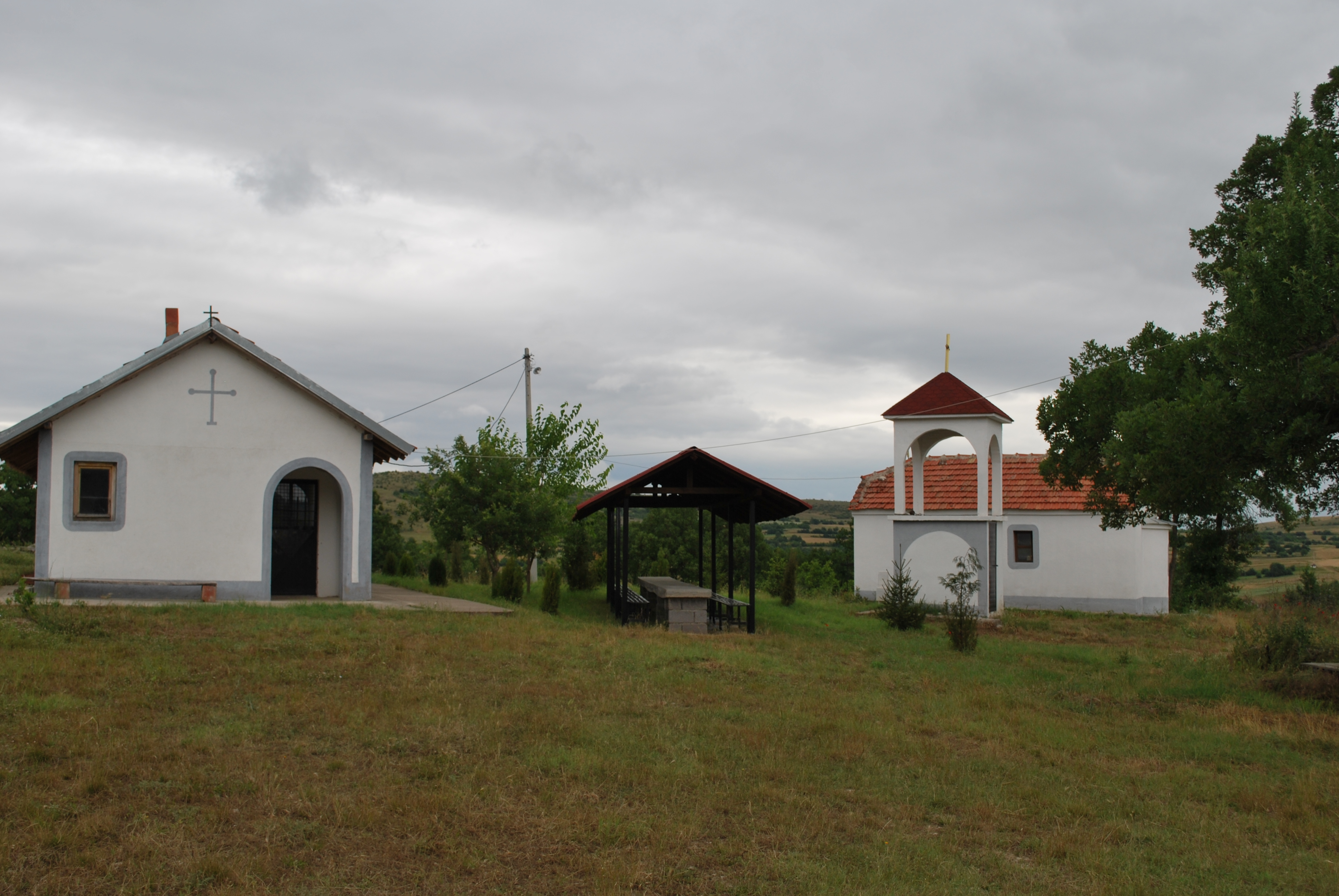
St. John the Baptist, Skačkovce, Kumanovo

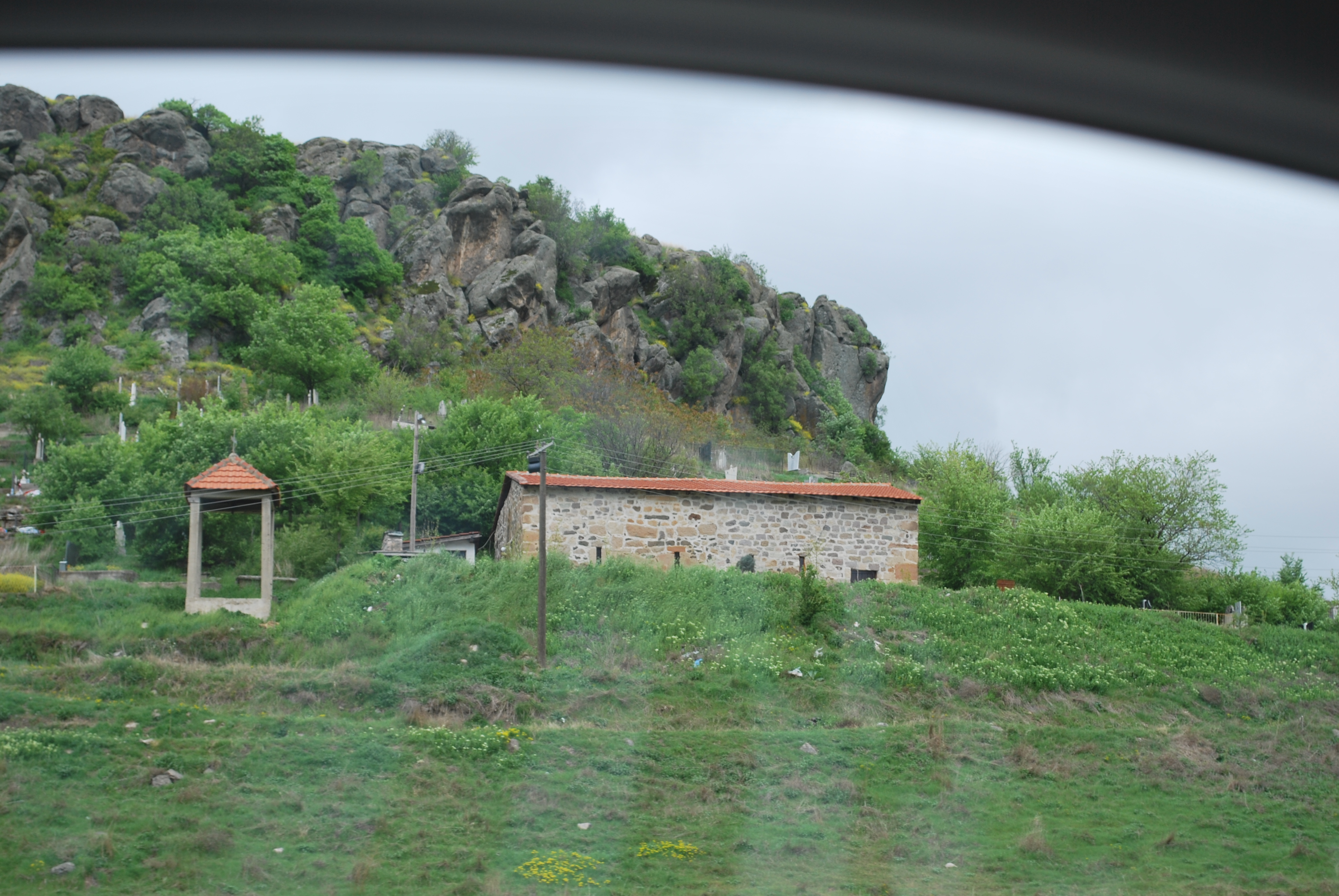
St. Petka, Ml. Nagoričane, Staro Nagorichane

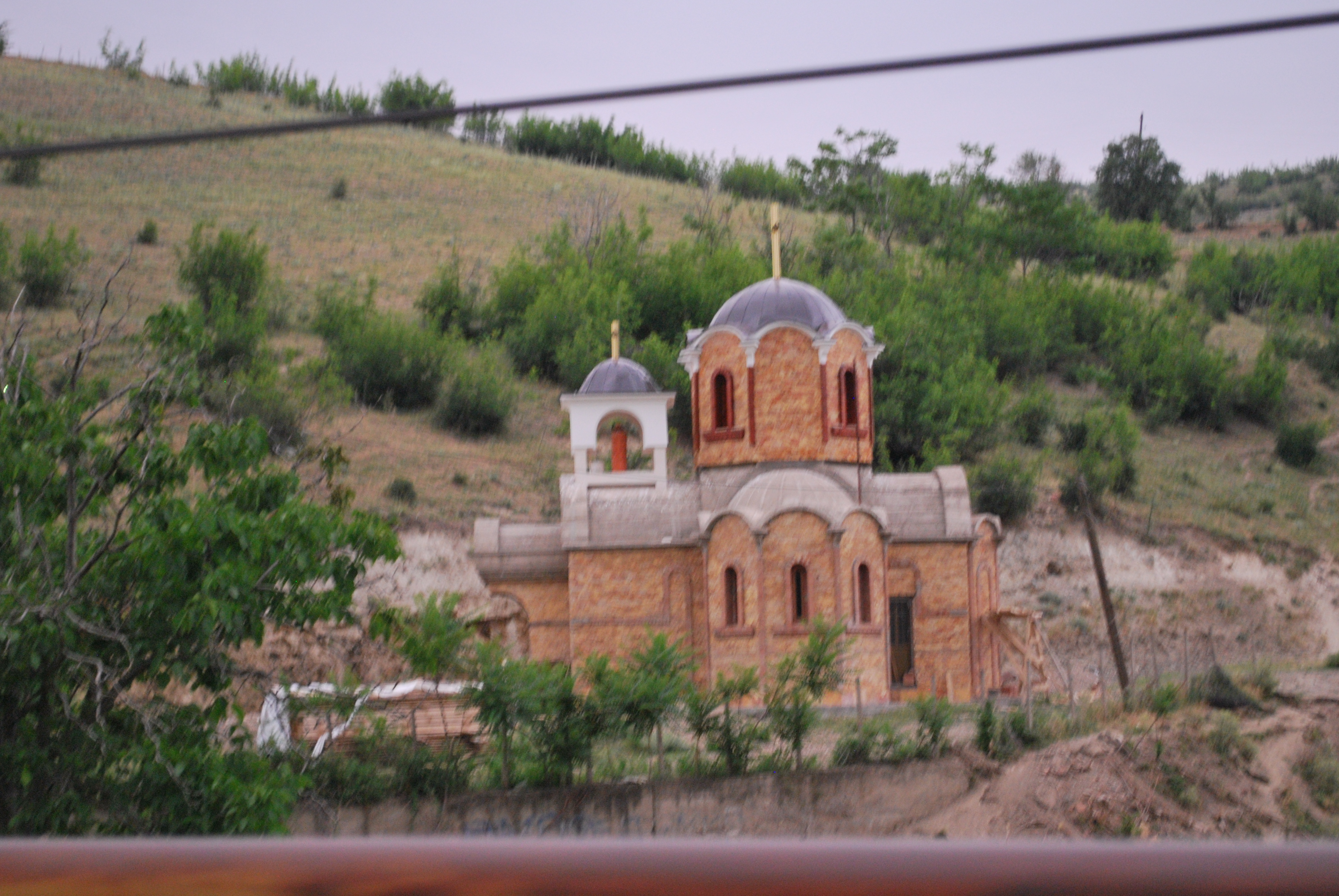
Ascension of Jesus, Pčinja, Kumanovo

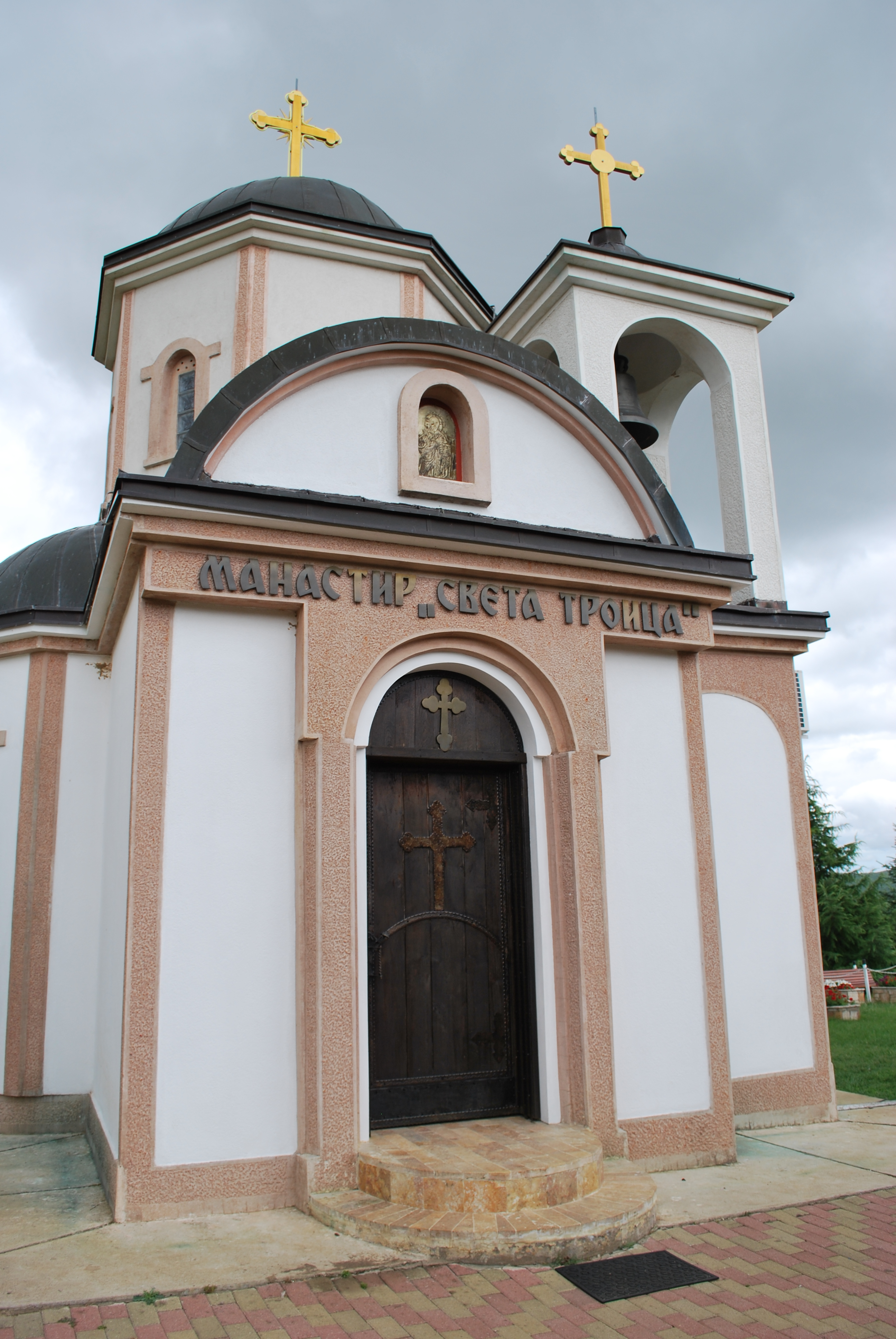
Holy Trinity, Skackovce, Kumanovo

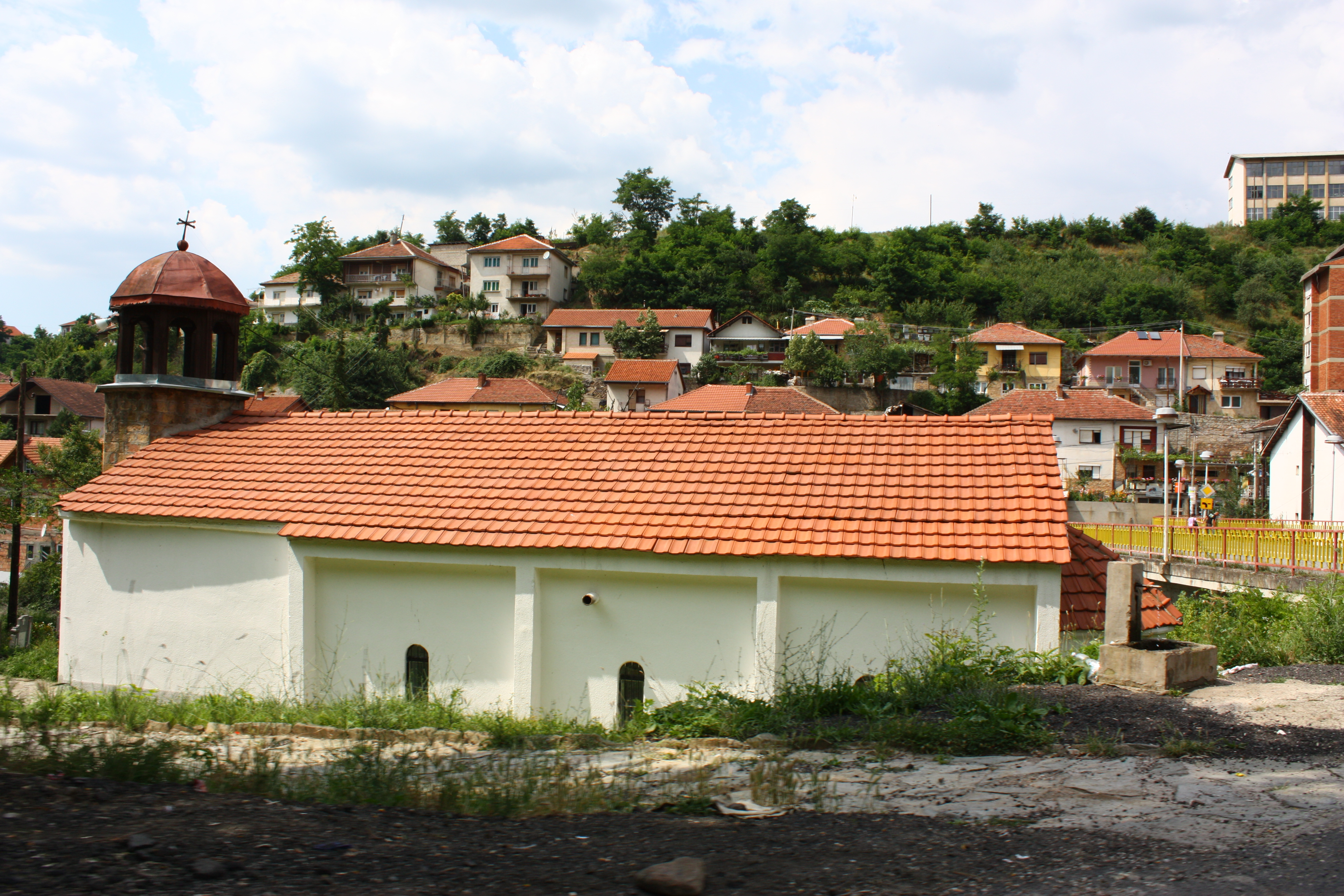
St. George, Kratovo

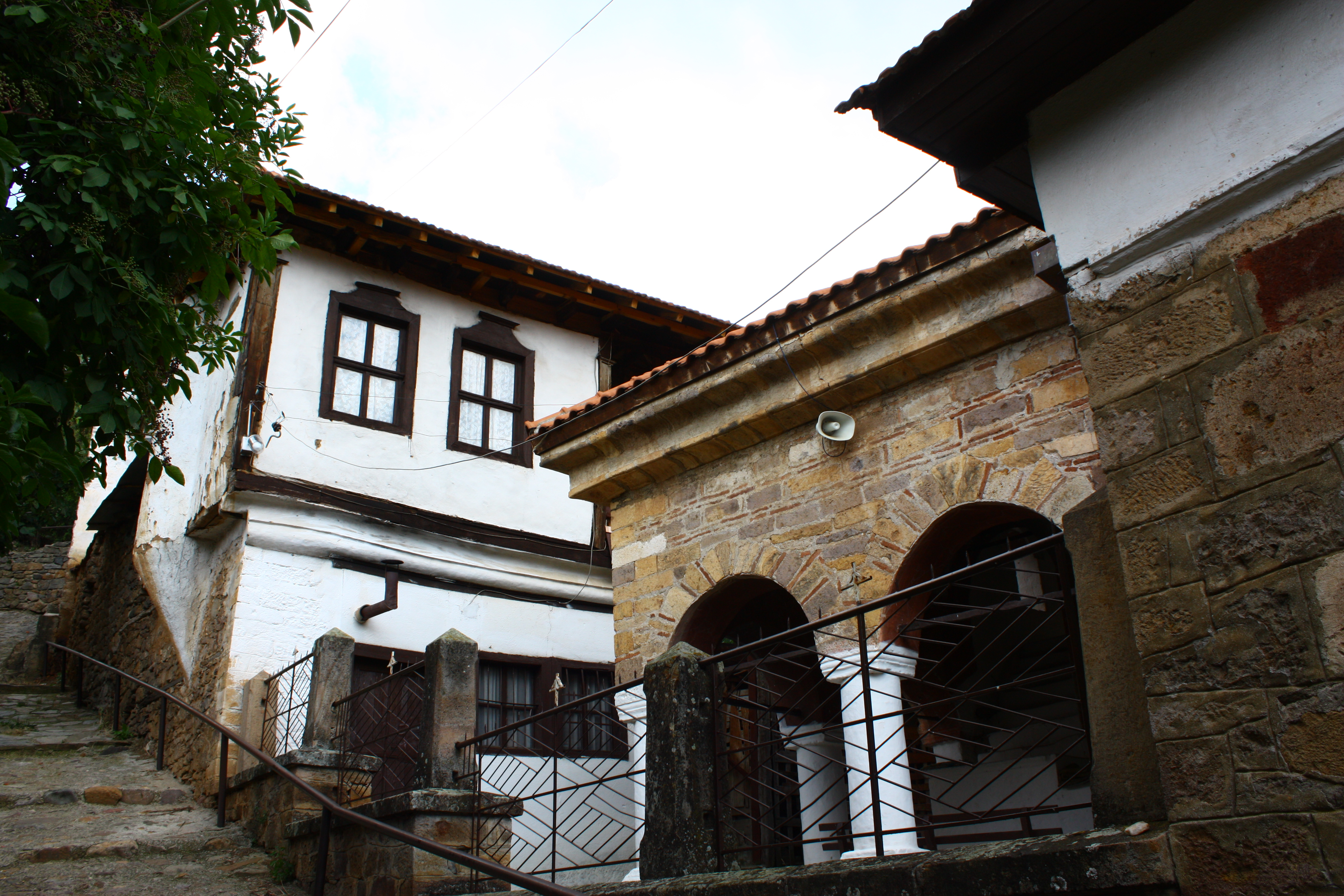
St. John the Baptist, Kratovo

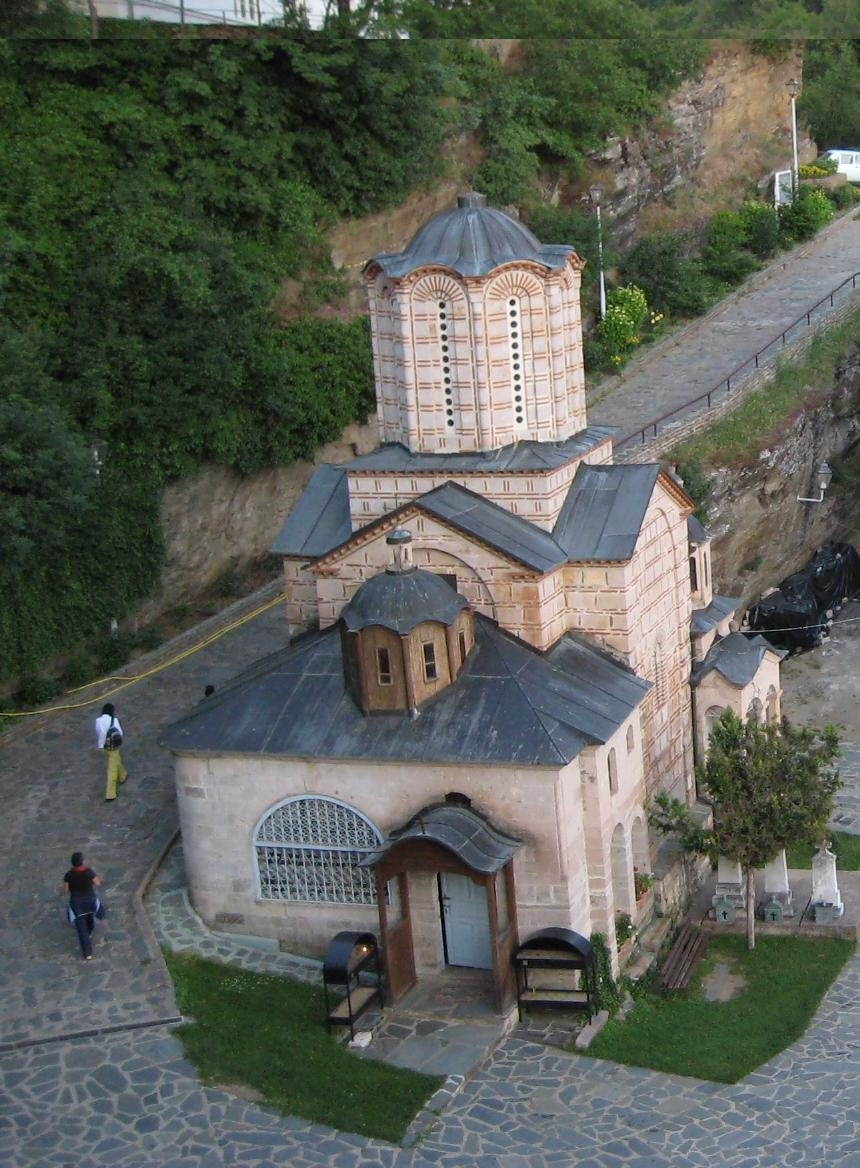
Nativity of the Theotokos, Kriva Palanka

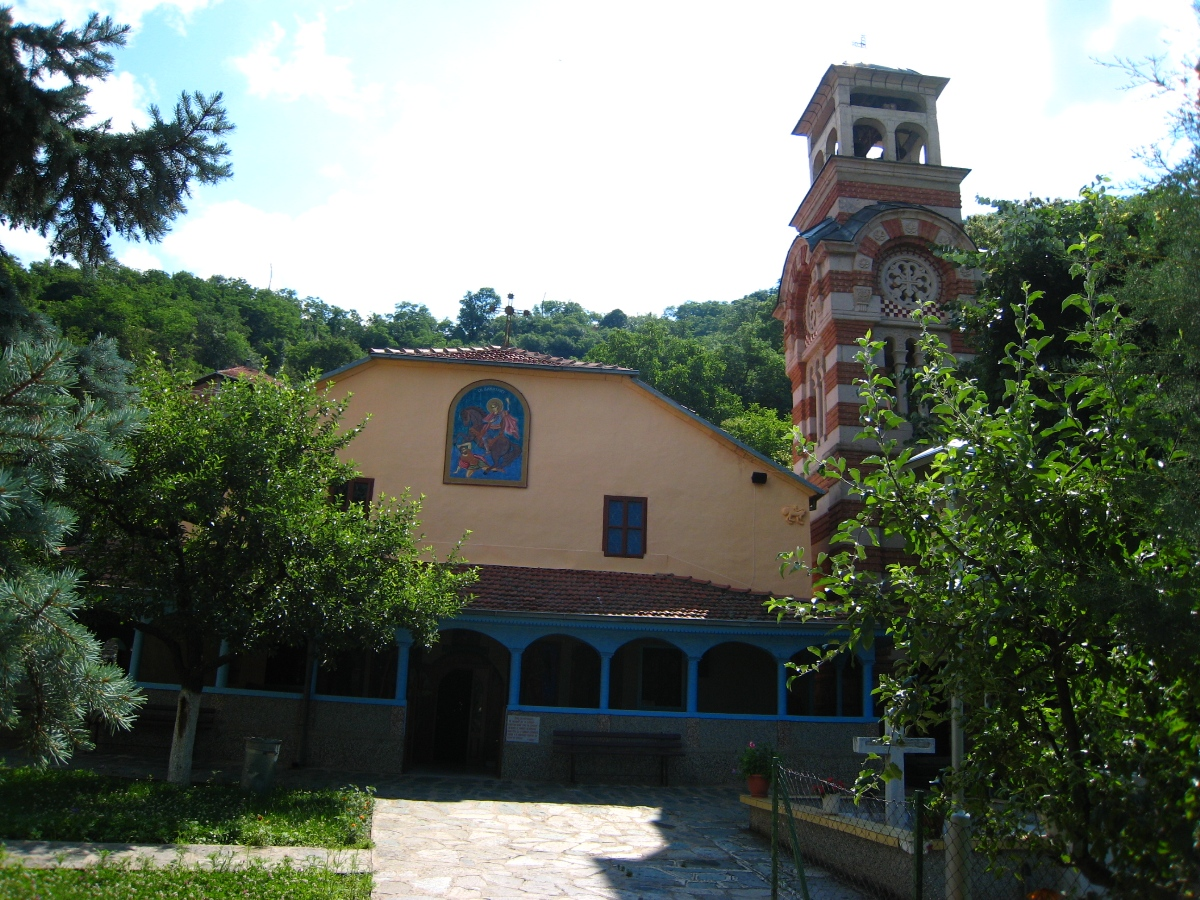
St. Demetrius, Kriva Palanka

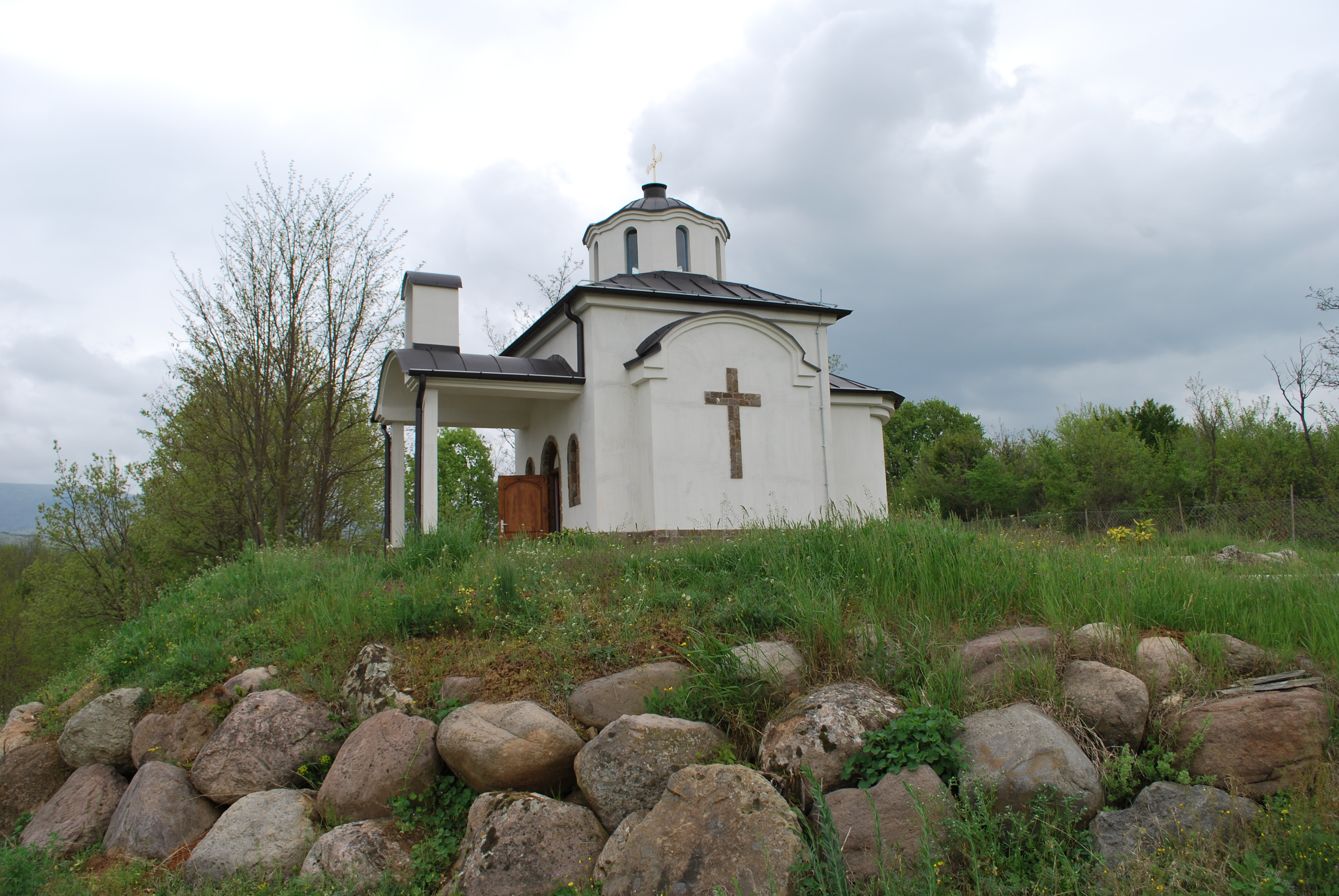
St. Paul, Ginovci, Kriva Palanka

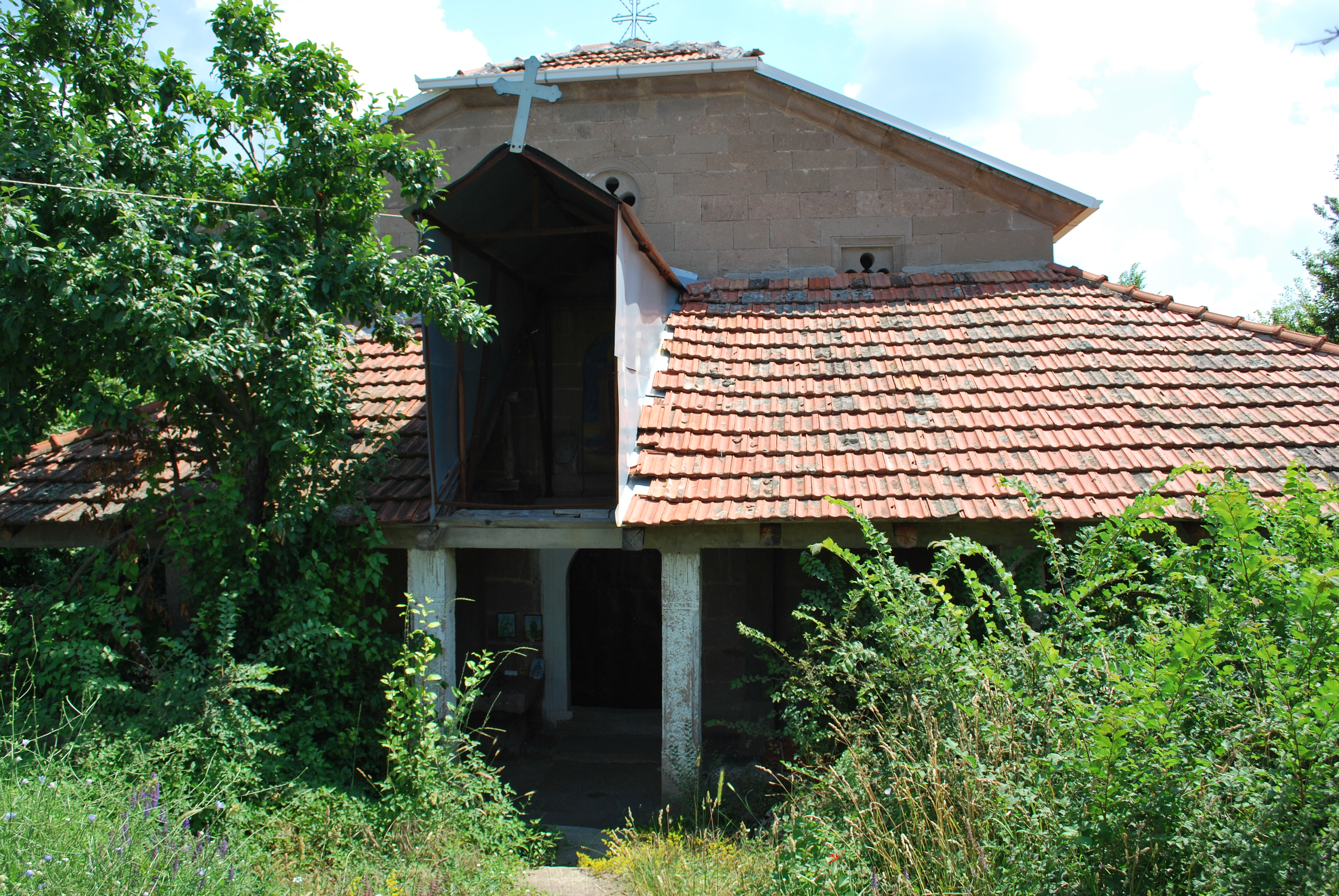
St. Petka, Rugjince, Kumanovo

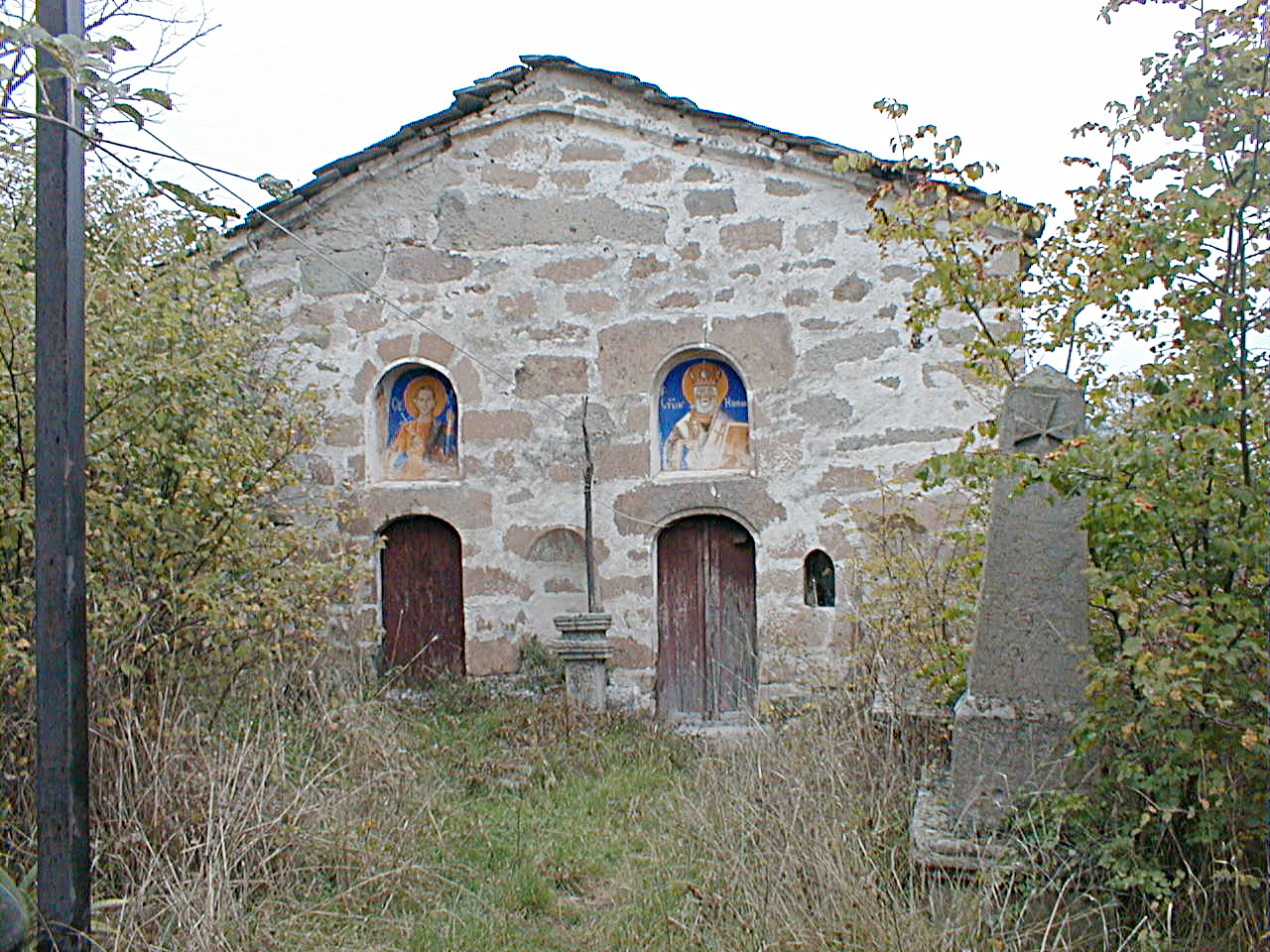
St. George and St. Nicholas, Orah, Staro Nagorichane

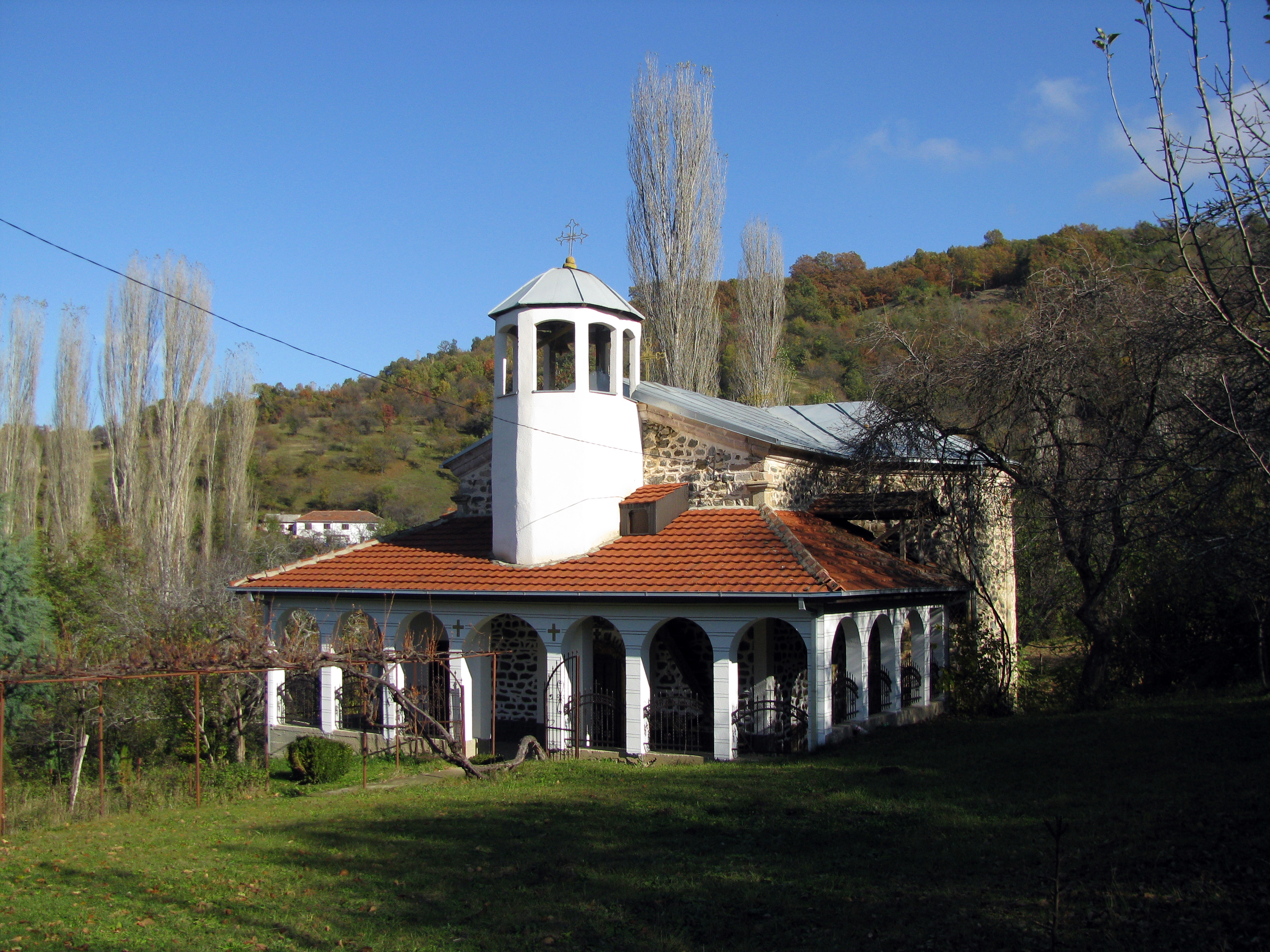
St. Theodor, Konopnica

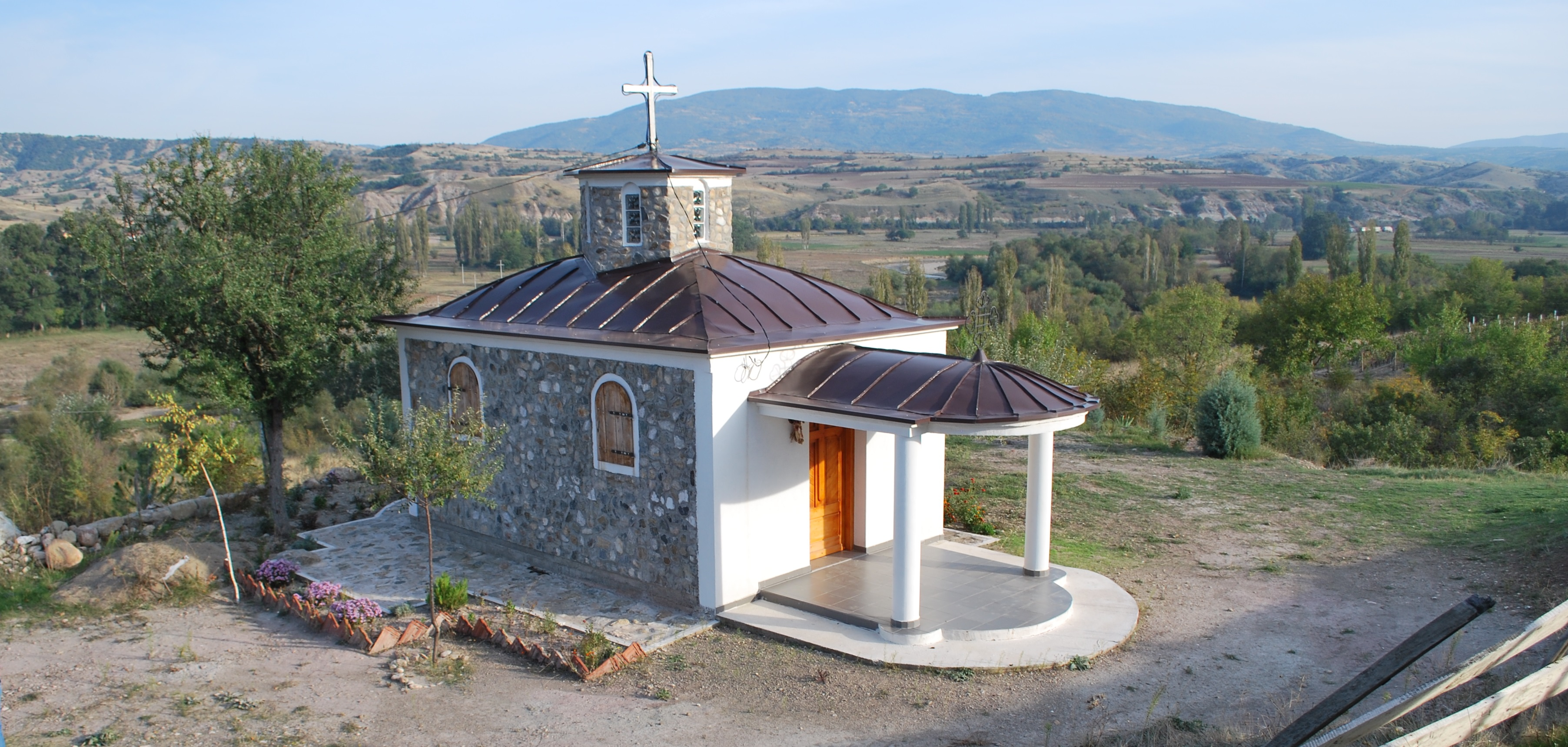
St. Elijah Gorno Konjari, Skopje

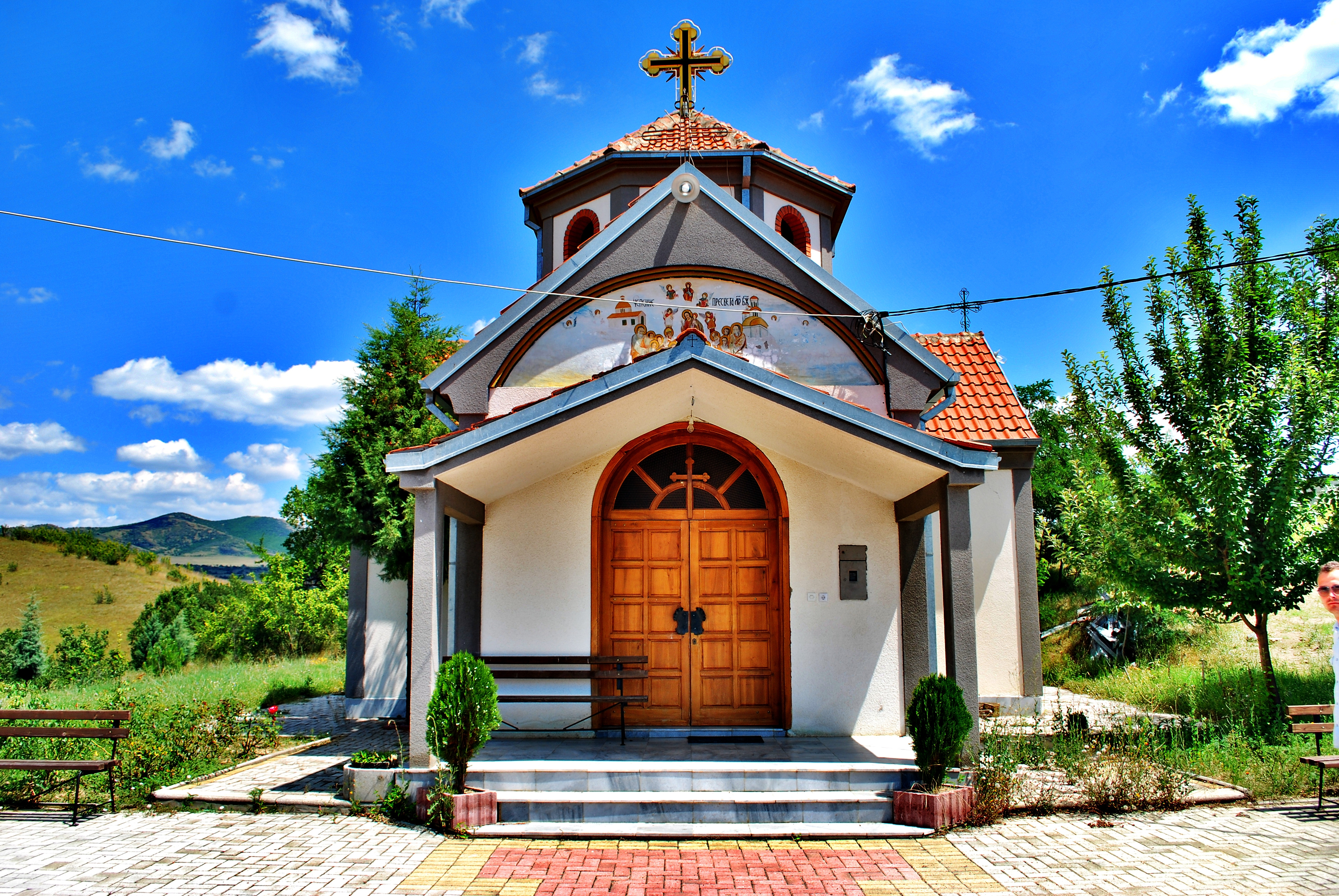
Dormition of the Theotokos Church, Gorno Konjari, Skopje

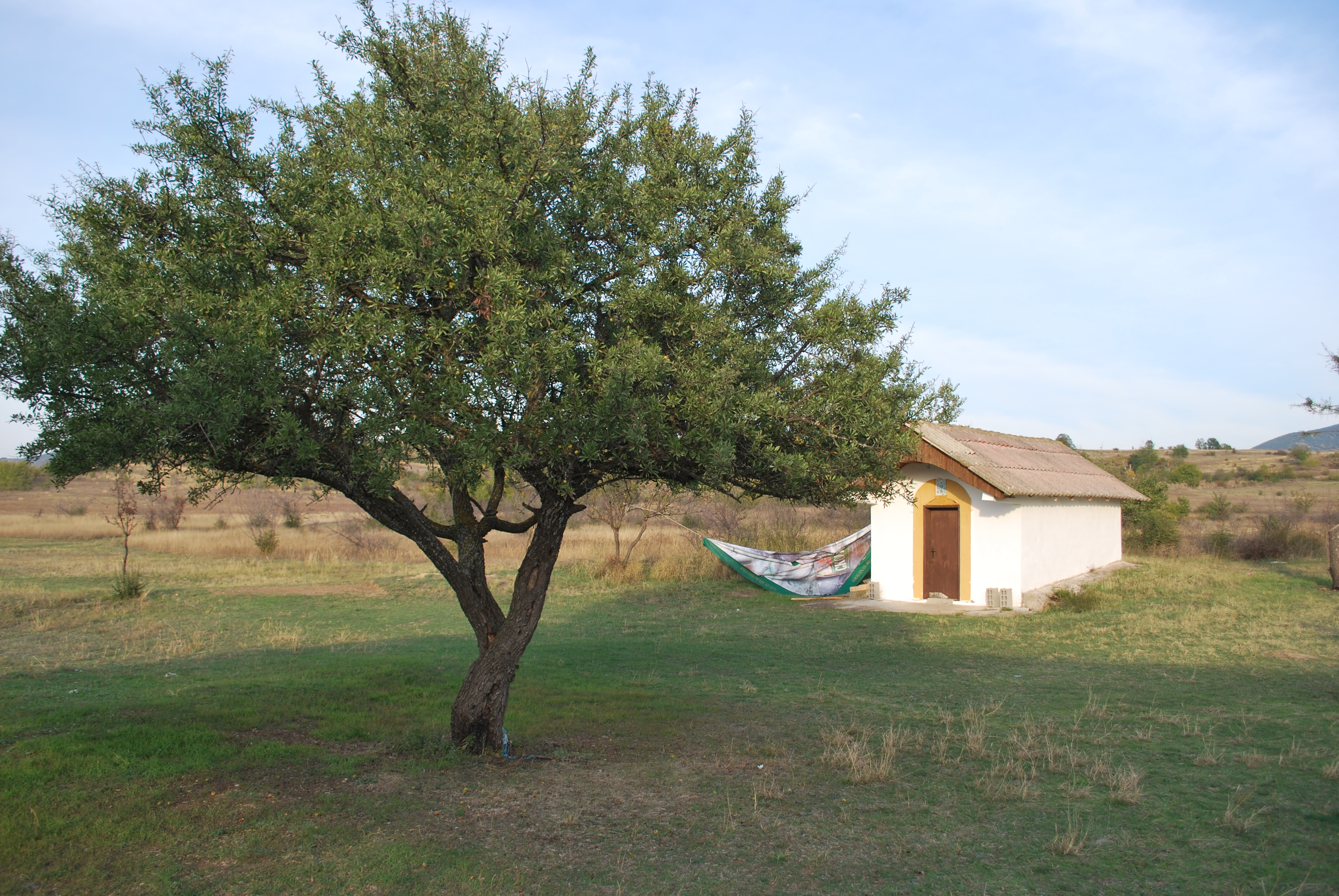
St. Petka, Vince, Kumanovo

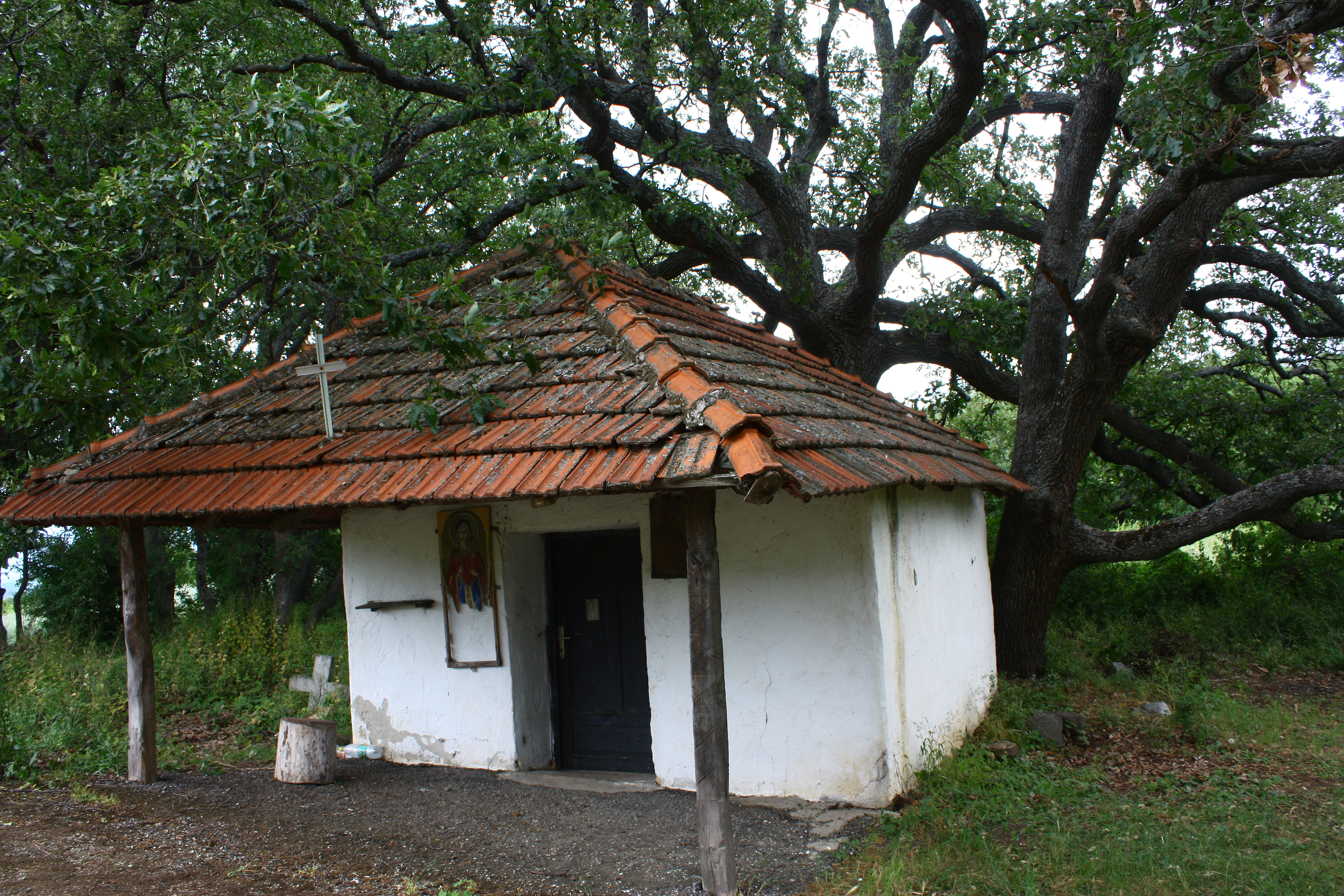
St. Petka, Zivenje, Kumanovo

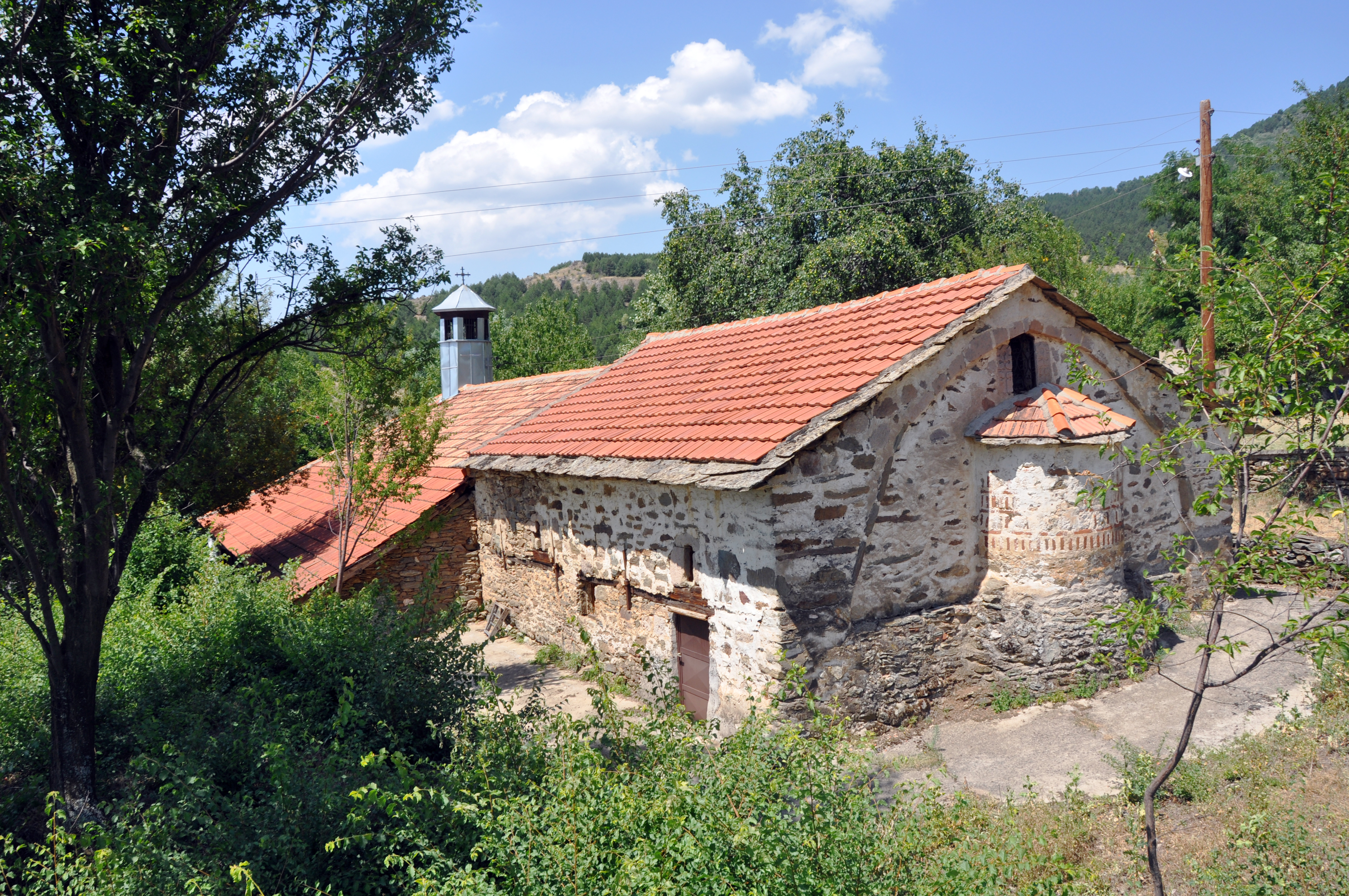
St. George, Petralica, Kriva Palanka

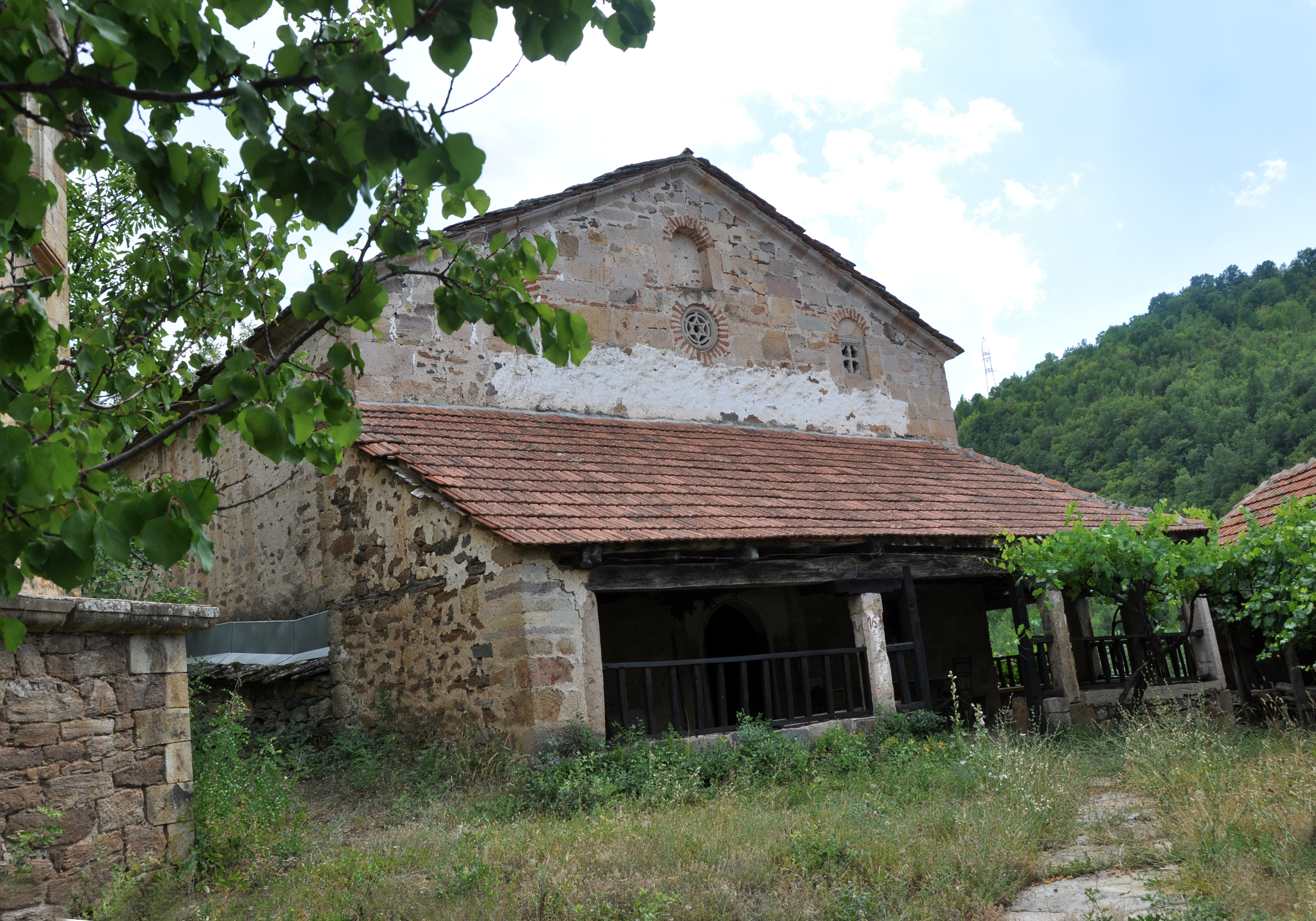
St. Nicholas, Opila, Rankovce

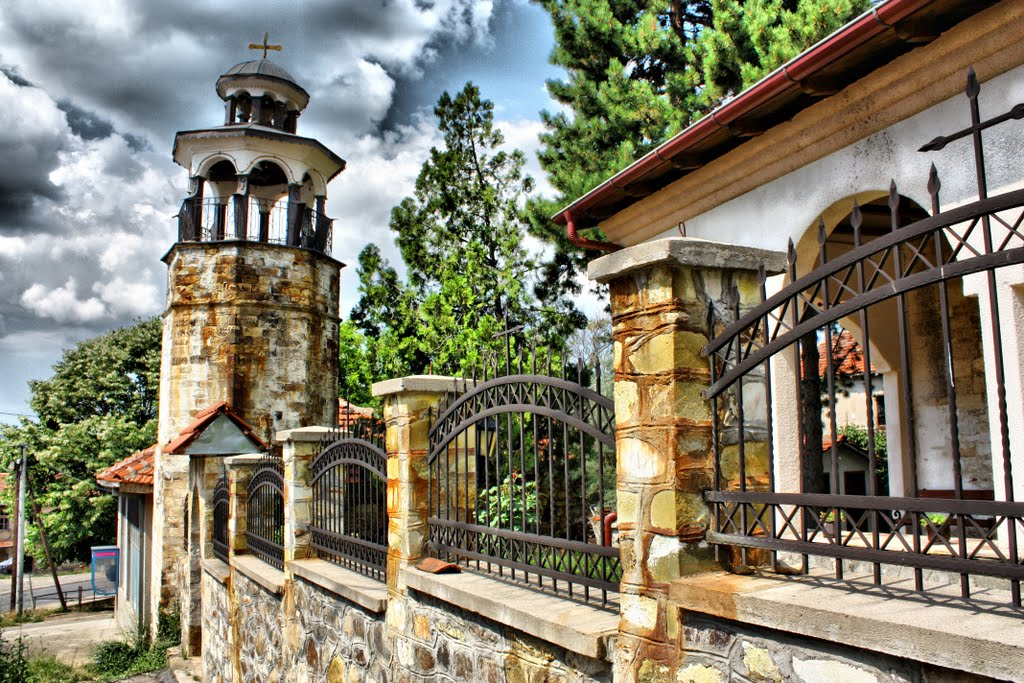
Presentation of the Theotokos, Šlegovo, Kratovo

== See also ==
- List of Metropolitans of Diocese of Kumanovo and Osogovo
