= Church St. Petka, Kumanovo =

Church of St. Petka, Kumanovo
- Црква "Света Петка" Куманово
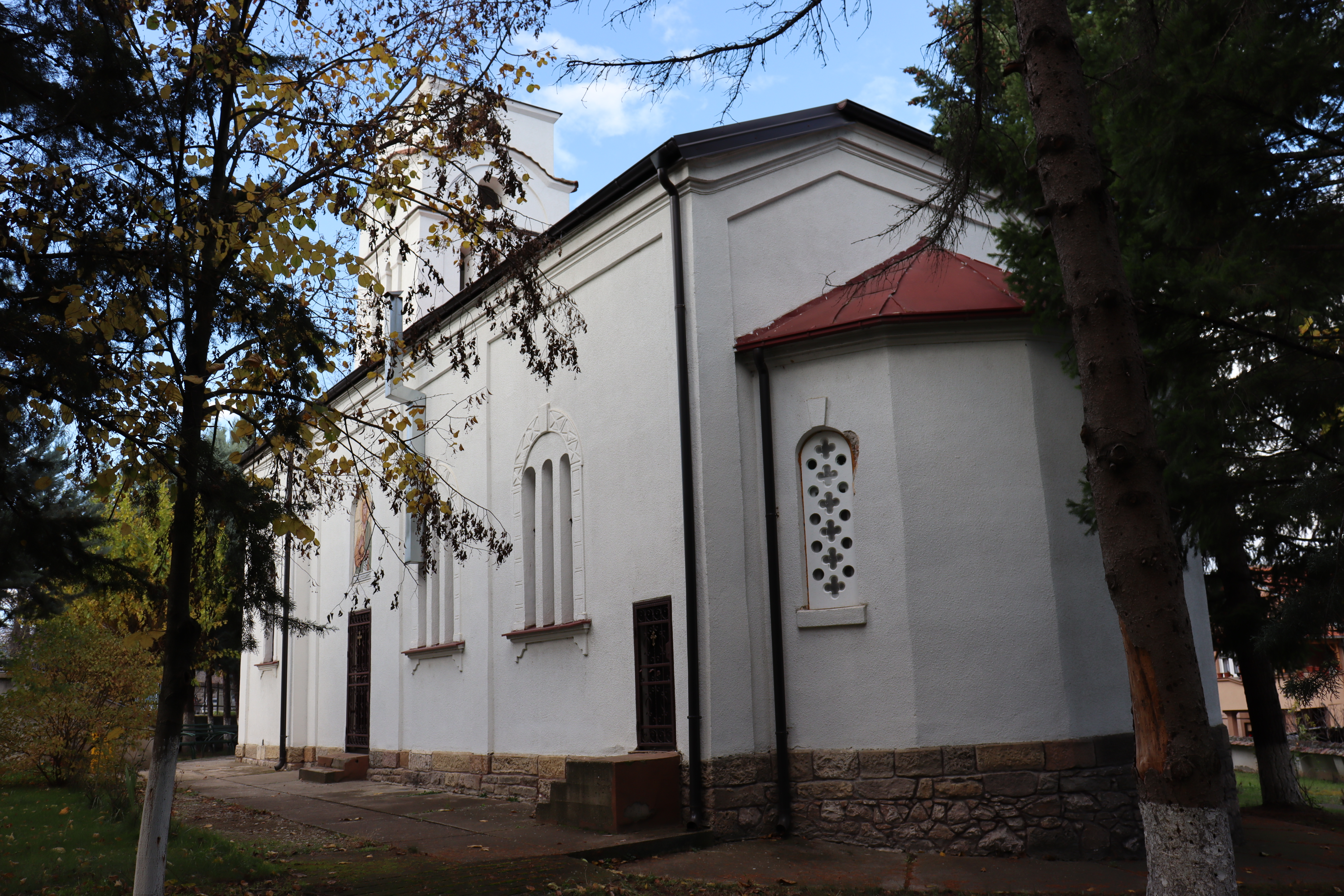
- Church of St. Petka, Kumanovo
- 42°08′30″N 21°41′42″E
- Location: Kumanovo
- Country: North Macedonia
- Denomination: Macedonian Orthodox Church
- Website: koe.mk

History
- Status: Church
- Dedication: St. Petka

Architecture
- Completed: June 29. 1926

Specifications
- Materials: Brick

Administration
- Province: Kumanovo
- Diocese: Diocese of Kumanovo and Osogovo

Clergy
- Archbishop: Stephen of Ohrid and Macedonia
- Bishop: Josif

The Church St. Petka, Kumanovo (Macedonian: Црква Света Петка, Куманово) is an Eastern Orthodox church in the Bedinje (Бедиње) neighborhood in Kumanovo, North Macedonia.
