= Vinka Sazdova =

Macedonian writer

Vinka Sazdova (10 August 1956) is a Macedonian writer. She is also the founder of the publishing store TRI in Skopje.

== Biography ==
Vinka Sazdova was born on 10 August 1956 in Strezovce, Socialist Republic of Macedonia (SR Macedonia). She studied psychology at the Philosophical Faculty in Skopje. She worked as a journalist in the culture segment of the daily newspaper Večer and as the editor of culture for the newspaper Republika. She then worked as a collaborator for the publishing house Kultura, and as a director and main editor of the publishing house Zumpres. She founded Tri in 1999 and was its main editor for ten years.

Her publications include: The Last Tea (2009), Luna (2015) and Vilino (2019).

== Private life ==
Sazdova is married to Slavko more than forty years. They have three sons together: Aleksandar, Bojan and Ljubomir.
