= Church St. George, Beljakovce =

- Црква „Свети Ѓорѓи“ Бељаковце
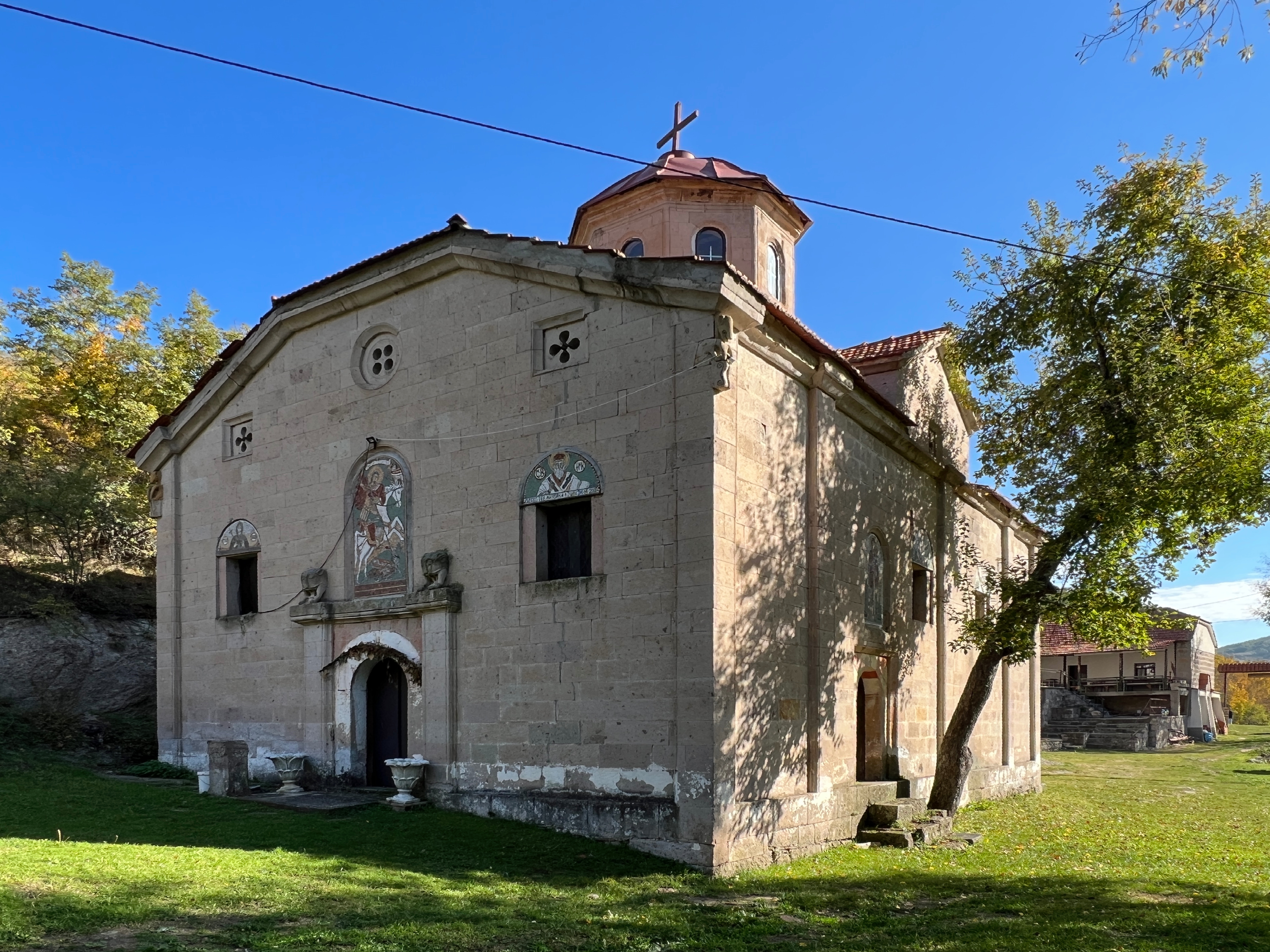
- Church St. George, Beljakovce
- 42°05′09″N 21°55′44″E
- Location: Kumanovo Municipality
- Country: North Macedonia
- Denomination: Macedonian Orthodox Church
- Website: koe.mk

History
- Status: Church
- Dedication: St. George

Specifications
- Materials: Brick

Administration
- Province: Kumanovo Municipality
- Diocese: Diocese of Kumanovo and Osogovo

Clergy
- Archbishop: Stephen
- Bishop: Josif

The Church St. George, Beljakovce (Црква „Свети Ѓорѓи“ Бељаковце) is an Eastern Orthodox church in Beljakovce, Kumanovo, North Macedonia.
