= Church of St. George, Tromegje, Kumanovo =

- Црква Св. Ѓорѓи, Тромеѓе, Куманово
- Church of St. George, Tromegje, Kumanovo
- Location: Tromegje, Kumanovo
- Country: North Macedonia
- Denomination: Macedonian Orthodoxy

History
- Status: Church
- Founded: 27 October 2000
- Founder: Kiril
- Dedication: Saint George

Specifications
- Materials: Brick

Administration
- Province: Kumanovo
- Diocese: Diocese of Kumanovo and Osogovo

Clergy
- Archbishop: Stephen of Ohrid and Macedonia
- Bishop: Joseph

The Church of St. George is a Christian Orthodox Church in the village of Tromegje in Kumanovo Municipality, North Macedonia.

== See also ==
- Kumanovo
