= Church St. Nicholas, Beljakovce =

- Црква „Свети Никола“ Бељаковце
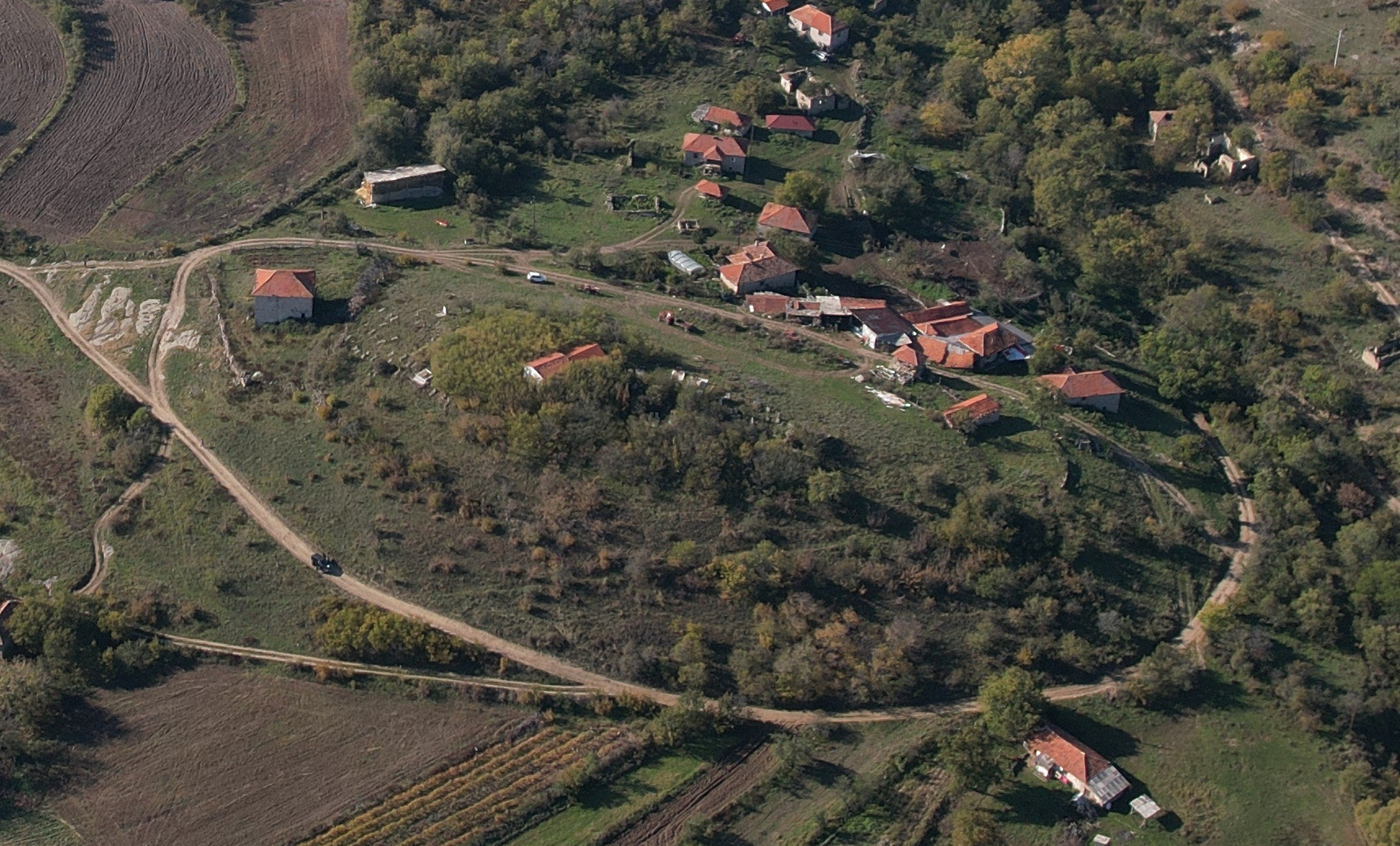
- Church St. Nicholas, Beljakovce
- 42.1007°N 21.9403°E
- Location: Beljakovce, Kumanovo Municipality
- Country: North Macedonia
- Denomination: Macedonian Orthodox Church
- Website: koe.mk

History
- Status: Church
- Dedicated: St. Nicholas

Specifications
- Materials: Brick

Administration
- Province: Kumanovo
- Diocese: Diocese of Kumanovo and Osogovo

Clergy
- Archbishop: Stephen
- Bishop: Josif

The Church St. Nicholas, Beljakovce (Црква „Свети Никола“ Бељаковце) is an Eastern Orthodox church in Beljakovce, Kumanovo, North Macedonia.
