= Church St. Dimitrija, Bajlovce =

- Црква Свети Димитрија, Бајловце
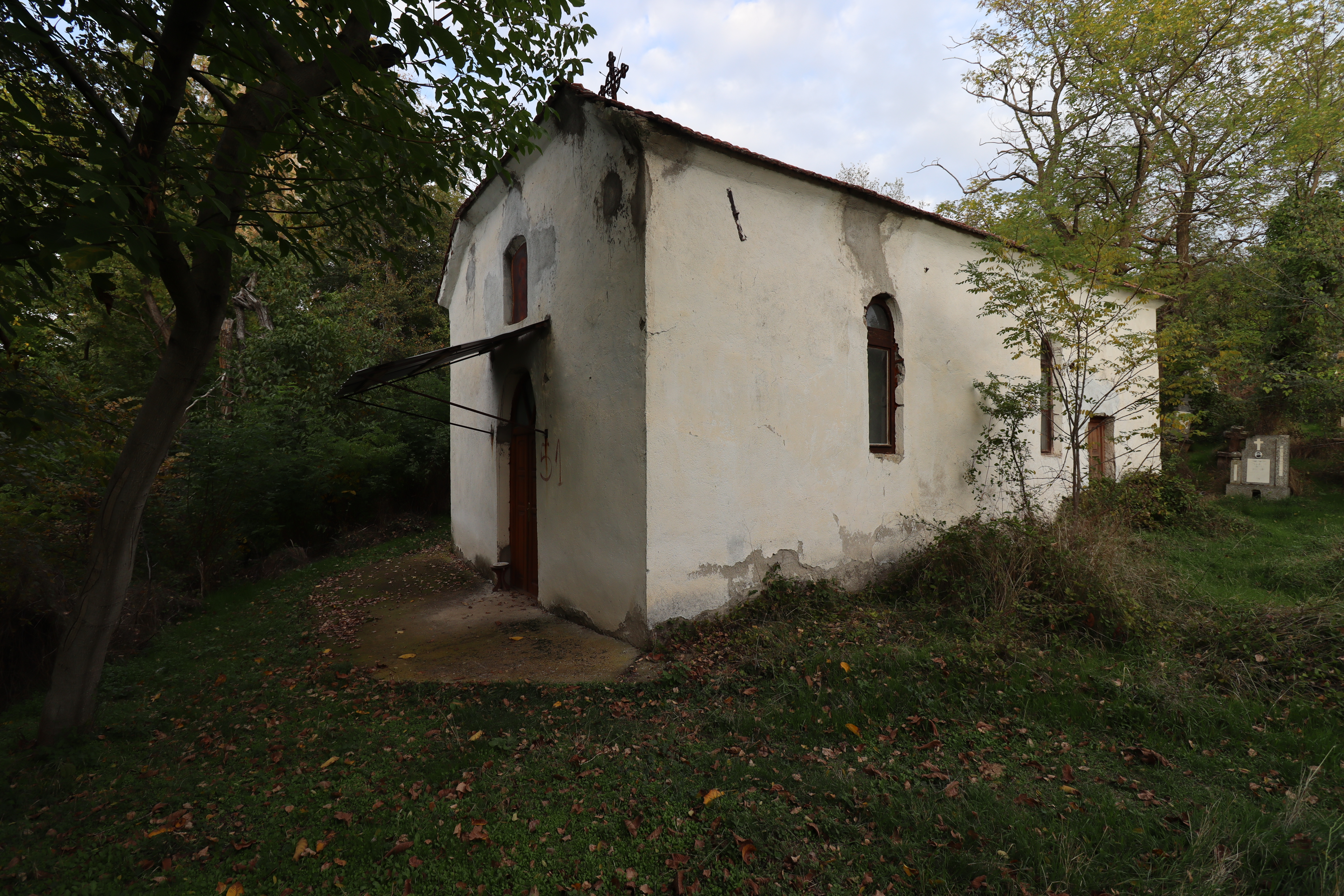
- View of the church
- Church St. Dimitrija, Bajlovce
- 42°13′45″N 21°57′46″E
- Location: Kumanovo Municipality
- Country: North Macedonia
- Denomination: Macedonian Orthodox Church

History
- Status: Church
- Dedication: St. Dimitrija

Specifications
- Materials: Brick

Administration
- Province: Kumanovo
- Diocese: Diocese of Kumanovo and Osogovo

Clergy
- Archbishop: Stephen
- Bishop: Josif

The Church St. Dimitrija is an Eastern Orthodox church in Bajlovce, Kumanovo, North Macedonia.
