= Kumanovo-Kratovo Deanery =

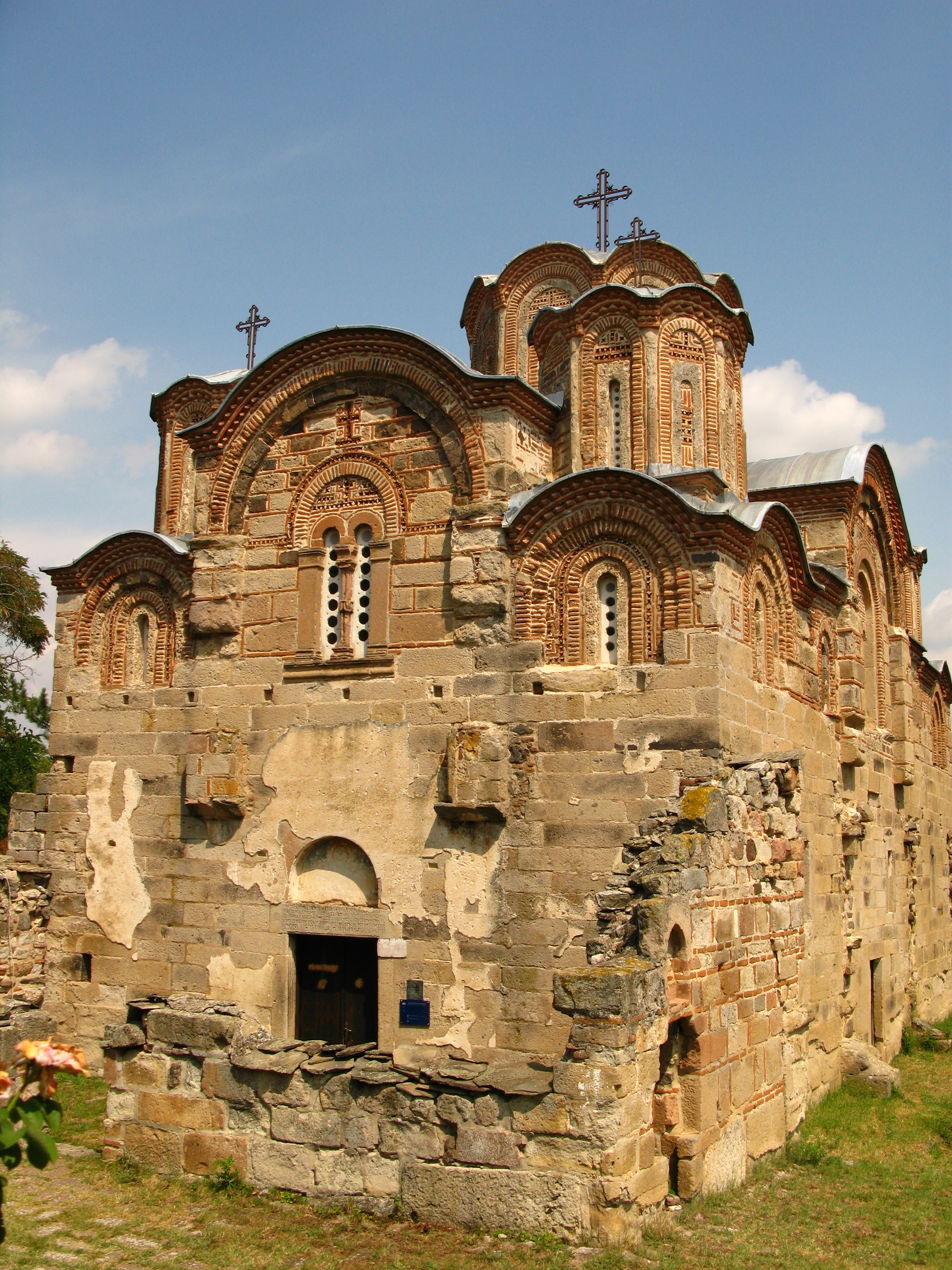
St. George Monastery in Staro Nagorichane

Kumanovo-Kratovo Deanery is part of Diocese of Kumanovo and Osogovo, located in North Macedonia.

== Publishing ==
In Kumanovo-Osogovo diocese are actively publishing, within which is issued The quarterly diocesan "Tavor".
