= Church St. Archangel Michael, Kumanovo =

Church of St. Archangel Michael, Kumanovo
- Црква „Свети Архангел Михаил“ Куманово
- Location: Kumanovo
- Country: North Macedonia
- Denomination: Macedonian Orthodox Church

History
- Status: Church
- Dedication: St. Archangel Michael

Architecture
- Functional status: open
- Construction cost: confidential

Specifications
- Materials: Brick

Administration
- Province: Kumanovo
- Diocese: Diocese of Kumanovo and Osogovo

Clergy
- Archbishop: Stefan
- Bishop: Josif

The Church St. Archangel Michael, Kumanovo (Macedonian Cyrillic: Црква Свети Архангел Михаил, Куманово) is an Eastern Orthodox church under construction in the Karposh neighborhood in Kumanovo, North Macedonia.

== See also ==
- Kumanovo
