= Church of St. Mina, Kumanovo =

- Црква „Свети Мина”, Куманово
- Location: Proevce, Kumanovo
- Country: North Macedonia
- Denomination: Macedonian Orthodox Church
- Website: koe.mk

History
- Status: Church
- Dedication: St. Mina

Specifications
- Materials: Brick

Administration
- Province: Kumanovo
- Diocese: Diocese of Kumanovo and Osogovo

Clergy
- Archbishop: Stefan
- Bishop: Josif

Church of St. Mina (Macedonian: Црква Свети Мина) is a Christian Orthodox church in the village Proevce in Kumanovo, North Macedonia.

The church was robbed in 2014, but no major damage was caused.

There was planned renovation of the church in 2014 by Diocese of Kumanovo and Osogovo.

== See also ==
- St. Mina
