= Church of Resurrection of Christ, Kumanovo =

- Црква „Воскресението Христово“ Куманово
- Location: Kumanovo
- Country: North Macedonia
- Denomination: Macedonian Orthodoxy
- Website: koe.mk

History
- Status: Church
- Founded: April 25, 2014
- Dedication: Resurrection of Christ

Architecture
- Functional status: Completed
- Completed: April 25, 2015
- Construction cost: confidential

Specifications
- Materials: Brick

Administration
- Province: Kumanovo
- Diocese: Diocese of Kumanovo and Osogovo
- Parish: Kumanovo

Clergy
- Archbishop: Stefan
- Bishop: Josif

Church of Resurrection of Christ is an Orthodox church building under construction in Kumanovo, North Macedonia. Construction started on 25 of April 2014.

== See also ==
- Kumanovo
