= Gorno Konjari =

Gorno Konjari Горно Коњари
- Village
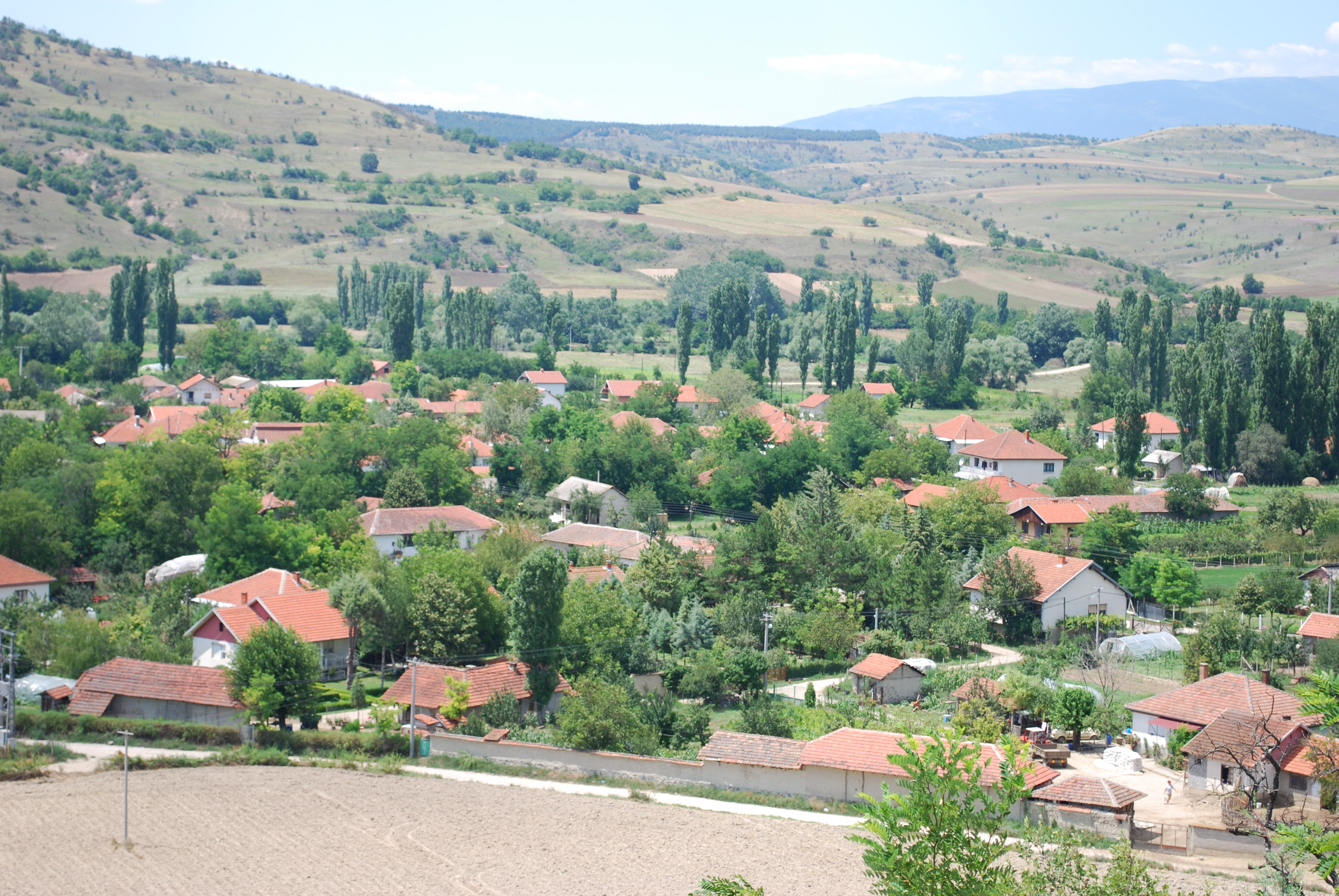

- Location within North Macedonia
- Coordinates: 41.975719°N 21.721514°E
- Country: North Macedonia
- Region: Skopje
- Municipality: Petrovec

Population (2021)
  - Total: 244
- Time zone: UTC+1 (CET)
  - Summer (DST): UTC+2 (CEST)
- Car plates: SK
- Website: .

Gorno Konjari (Macedonian: Горно Коњари) is a village in the municipality of Petrovec, North Macedonia.

== Demographics ==
As of the 2021 census, Gorno Konjari had 244 residents with the following ethnic composition:

- Macedonians - 229
- Persons for whom data are taken from administrative sources - 11
- Serbs - 3
- Others - 1

According to the 2002 census, the village had a total of 237 inhabitants. Ethnic groups in the village include:

- Macedonians - 236
- Serbs - 1
