= Luke, North Macedonia =

Luke Луке
- Village
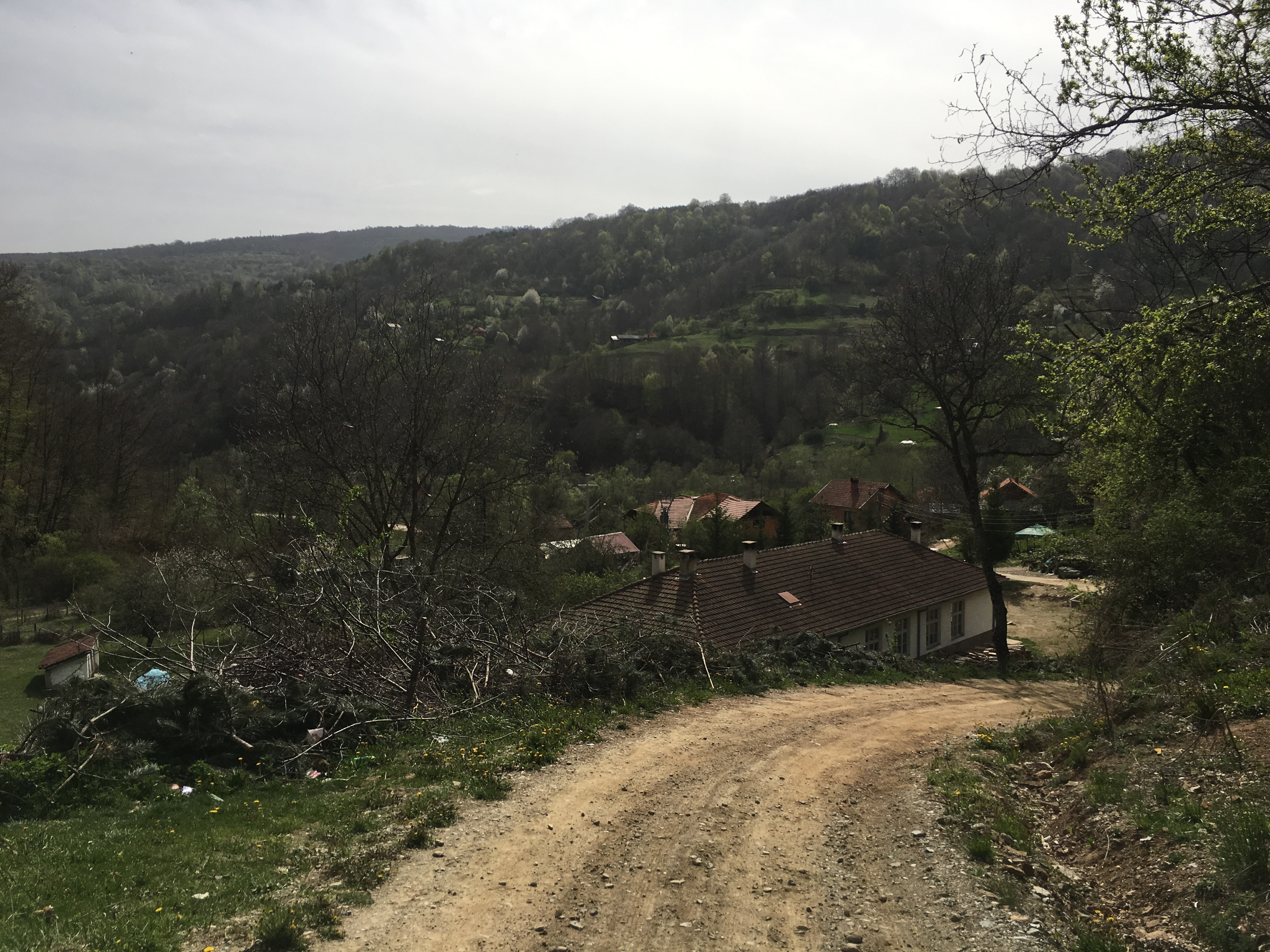
- View of the village Luke

- Location within North Macedonia
- Country: North Macedonia
- Region: Northeastern
- Municipality: Kriva Palanka

Population (2002)
  - Total: 338
- Time zone: UTC+1 (CET)
  - Summer (DST): UTC+2 (CEST)
- Website: .

Luke (Macedonian: Луке) is a rural mountain village in the municipality of Kriva Palanka, North Macedonia. It is located closed to the border with Serbia and Bulgaria.

== Name ==
The name Luke is believed to be a German, originating from German word "die Luke" as in this region the Saxons settled in the 13th century and mixed with local Slavic population.

== Demographics ==
According to the 2002 census, the village had a total of 338 inhabitants. Ethnic groups in the village include:

- Macedonians 337
- Serbs 1
