= Orašac, Kumanovo =

Orašac Орашац
- Village
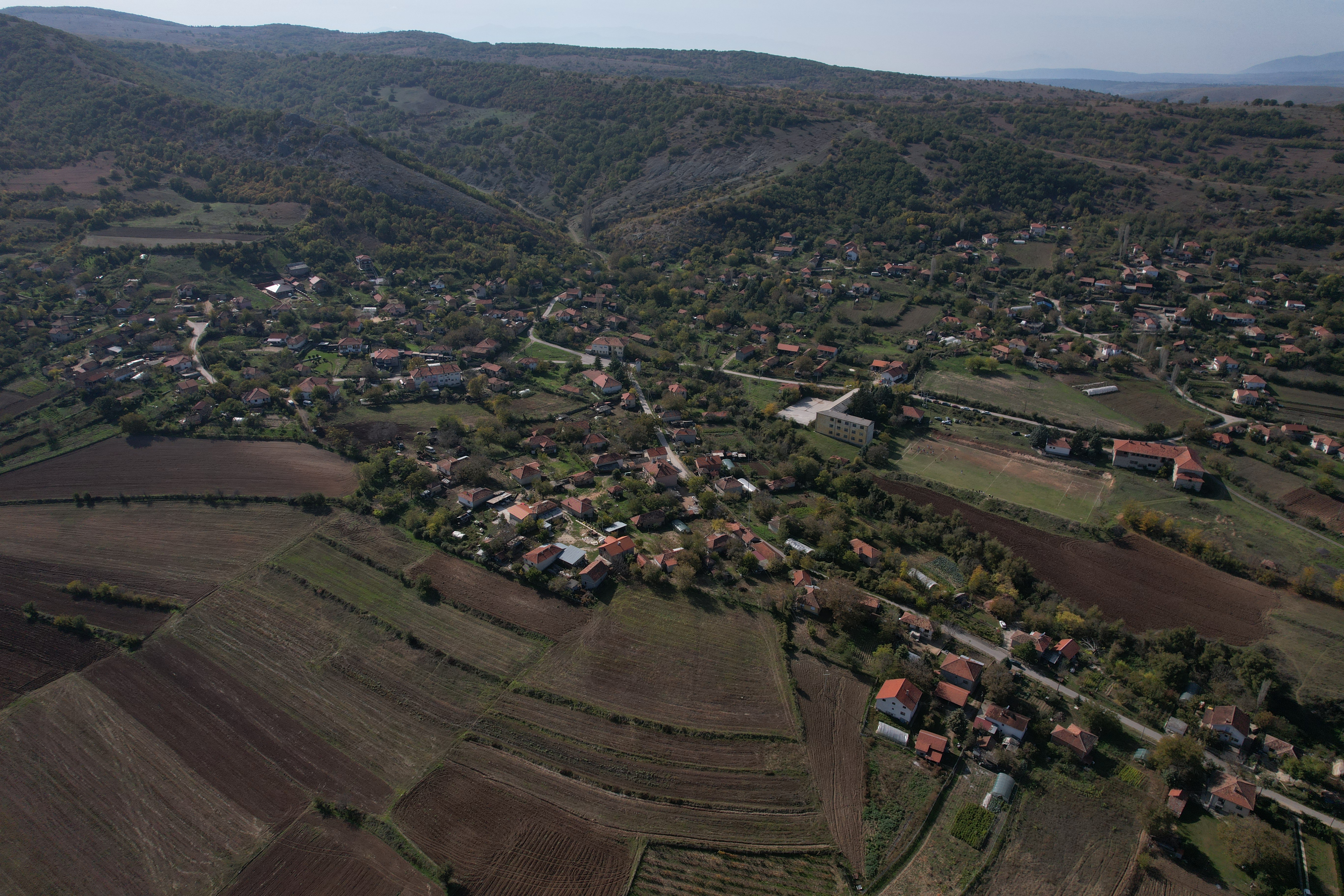
- Airview of the village

- Location within North Macedonia
- Country: North Macedonia
- Region: Northeastern
- Municipality: Kumanovo

Population (2002)
  - Total: 387
- Time zone: UTC+1 (CET)
  - Summer (DST): UTC+2 (CEST)
- Car plates: KU
- Website: .

Orašac (Macedonian: Орашац) is a village in the Kumanovo Municipality of North Macedonia. Before 2003 it was a standalone municipality. The FIPS code for it was MK75.

== Demographics ==
According to the 2002 census, the village had a total of 387 inhabitants. Ethnic groups in the village include:

- Macedonians 387
