= Bujkovci =

Bujkovci Бујковци
- Village
- Location within North Macedonia
- Country: North Macedonia
- Region: Skopje
- Municipality: Ilinden

Population (2002)
  - Total: 946
- Time zone: UTC+1 (CET)
  - Summer (DST): UTC+2 (CEST)
- Car plates: SK
- Website: .

Bujkovci (Macedonian: Бујковци) is a village in the Ilinden Municipality of North Macedonia.

== Demographics ==
According to the 2002 census, the village had a total of 946 inhabitants. Ethnic groups in the village include:

- Macedonians: 641
- Serbs: 5
- Romani: 295
- Others: 5
