= Turalevo =

Turalevo Туралево
- Village
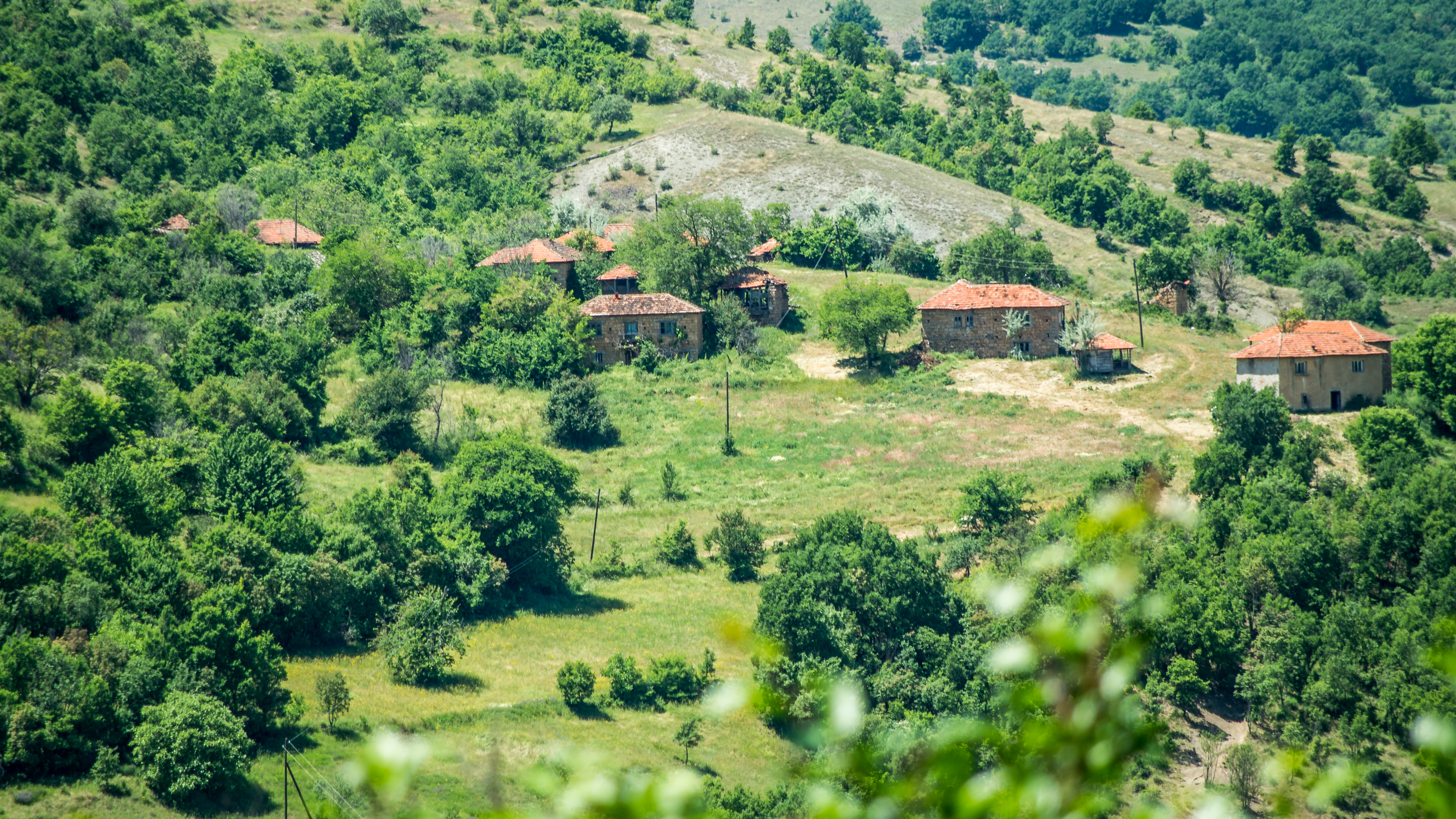
- View of the village

- Location within North Macedonia
- Coordinates: 42.079346°N 22.106146°E
- Country: North Macedonia
- Region: Northeastern
- Municipality: Kratovo

Population (2002)
  - Total: 326
- Time zone: UTC+1 (CET)
  - Summer (DST): UTC+2 (CEST)
- Website: .

Turalevo (Macedonian: Туралево) is a village in the municipality of Kratovo, North Macedonia.

== Demographics ==
According to the 2002 census, the village had a total of 326 inhabitants. Ethnic groups in the village include:

- Macedonians 324
- Other 2
