= Romanovce =

Romanovce Романовце Rramanli
- Village
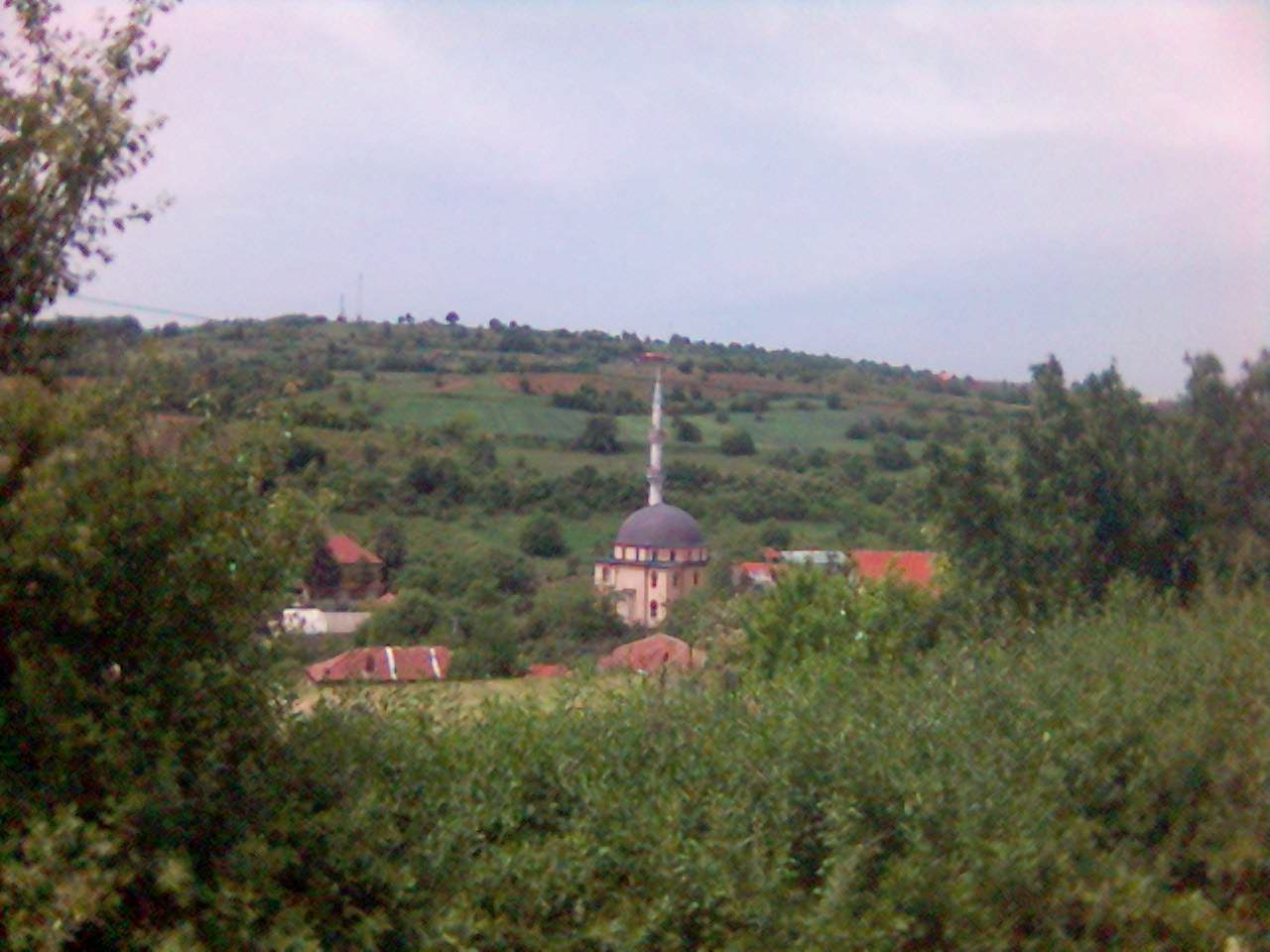
- View of the village

- Location within North Macedonia
- Coordinates: 42°05′N 21°42′E
- Country: North Macedonia
- Region: Northeastern
- Municipality: Kumanovo

Population (2002)
  - Total: 2,794
- Time zone: UTC+1 (CET)
  - Summer (DST): UTC+2 (CEST)
- Car plates: KU
- Website: .

Romanovce (Macedonian: Романовце, Albanian: Rramanli) is a village in the municipality of Kumanovo, North Macedonia.

== Demographics ==
On the 1927 ethnic map of Leonhard Schulze-Jena, the village is written as "Ramanovci" and shown as a Turkish village. According to the 2002 census, the village had a total of 2794 inhabitants. Ethnic groups in the village include:

- Albanians 2028
- Macedonians 716
- Turks 35
- Serbs 6
- Others 9
