= Prikovci =

Prikovci Приковци
- Village
- Location within North Macedonia
- Coordinates: 42.060769°N 22.146209°E
- Country: North Macedonia
- Region: Northeastern
- Municipality: Kratovo

Population (2002)
  - Total: 114
- Time zone: UTC+1 (CET)
  - Summer (DST): UTC+2 (CEST)
- Website: .

Prikovci (Macedonian: Приковци) is a village in the municipality of Kratovo, North Macedonia.

== Demographics ==
According to the 2002 census, the village had a total of 114 inhabitants. Ethnic groups in the village include:

- Macedonians 114
