= Trnovac, North Macedonia =

Trnovac Трновац
- Village
- Location within North Macedonia
- Country: North Macedonia
- Region: Northeastern
- Municipality: Kratovo

Population (2002)
  - Total: 330
- Time zone: UTC+1 (CET)
  - Summer (DST): UTC+2 (CEST)
- Website: .

Trnovac (Macedonian: Трновац) is a village in the municipality of Kratovo, North Macedonia.

== Demographics ==
According to the 2002 census, the village had a total of 330 inhabitants. Ethnic groups in the village include:

- Macedonians 330
