= Bedinje =

Bedinje Бедиње Bedinjë
- Location within North Macedonia
- Coordinates: 42°08′28″N 21°41′49″E
- Country: North Macedonia
- Region: Northeastern
- Municipality: Kumanovo

Population (2021)
  - Total: 898
- Time zone: UTC+1 (CET)
  - Summer (DST): UTC+2 (CEST)
- Car plates: KU
- Website: .

Bedinje (Macedonian: Бедиње, Albanian: Bedinjë) is a neighborhood in the municipality of Kumanovo, North Macedonia.

== Demographics ==
According to the 2002 census, the a neighborhood had a total of 2327 inhabitants, and in the 2021 census the neighborhood had a total of 898 inhabitants.

Ethnic groups in the neighborhood include:

Year	Macedonian	Albanian	Turks	Romani	Vlachs	Serbs	Bosniaks	Others	Total
2002	1 451	547	...	156	...	164	...	9	2 327
2021	232	531	2	...	...	48	1	84	898
