= Strezovce, Staro Nagoričane =

Strezovce Стрезовце
- Village
- Air view of the village

- Location within North Macedonia
- Coordinates: 42.134011°N 21.898906°E
- Country: North Macedonia
- Region: Northeastern
- Municipality: Staro Nagoričane

Population (2002)
  - Total: 117
- Time zone: UTC+1 (CET)
  - Summer (DST): UTC+2 (CEST)
- Car plates: KU

Strezovce (Macedonian: Стрезовце) is a village in the municipality of Staro Nagoričane, North Macedonia. It used to be part of the former municipality of Klečevce.

== Demographics ==
According to the 2002 census, the village had a total of 117 inhabitants. Ethnic groups in the village include:

- Macedonians 115
- Serbs 2
