= Sredorek (region) =

Sredorek (Macedonian: Средорек) is a historical and geographical region in northeastern Republic of Macedonia. It includes settlements in the Pčinja river valley, parts of the mountainous regions of Kozjak (Kozjačija), German and Rujen, which are today located within the Municipality of Staro Nagoričane. The region is predominantly inhabited by ethnic Macedonians and ethnic Serbs (see Serbs in the Republic of Macedonia), adherents of Eastern Orthodoxy. In the Middle Ages, the region was part of the župe (counties) of Žegligovo and Preševo.

Notable monuments in the region include the Church of St. George,

== Geography ==
The region includes settlements in the Pčinja river valley, parts of the mountainous regions of Kozjak (Kozjačija), German, Rujen, which are today located within the Municipality of Staro Nagoričane; roughly from Pčinja and the lower course of the Kriva Reka. The region borders Serbia to the north, and the historical and geographical regions of Slavište and Stracin.

== Settlements ==
Map of the Municipality of Staro Nagoričane (in Macedonian).

- Staro Nagoričane, Kozjak region
- Ruǵince, Pčinja valley
- Dejlovce, German region
- Vračevce, Kozjak region
- Malotino, Rujen region
- Stepance, Kozjak and German region
- Strezovce, Pčinja valley
- Strnovac, Rujen region
- Cvilance, Pčinja valley
- Čelopek, Pčinja valley
- Ramno, Kozjak and German region
- Puzajka, Rujen region
- Pelince, Pčinja valley
- Osiče, German region
- Orah, Pčinja valley
- Oblavce, Pčinja valley
- Nikuljane, mountainous region
- Mlado Nagoričane, Pčinja valley
- Makreš, Pčinja valley
- Miglence, Rujen region
- Kokino, Kozjak region
- Koince, Pčinja valley
- Karlovce, Kozjak region
- Kanarevo, Pčinja valley
- Željuvino, German region
- Žegljane, Kozjak region
- Dragomance, Pčinja valley
- Dobrača, Pčinja valley
- Vragoturce, Kozjak region
- Vojnik, Pčinja valley
- Bukovljane, Kozjak region
- Breško, German region
- Bajlovce, German region
- Arbanaško, Kozjak and German region
- Aljince, German region
- Algunja, mountainous

== History ==
In 1354, when Dejan had finished building the Arhiljevica Church of the Holy Mother of God, his endowment, he asked that some of the villages under his administration be granted to the church (as metochion). According to Stefan Dušan's charter to Arhiljevica dated 10 August 1354, sevastokrator Dejan, whom he called his brother ("брат царства ми севастократор Дејан"), possessed a large province east of Skopska Crna Gora. It included the old župe (counties) of Žegligovo and Preševo (modern Kumanovo region with Sredorek, Kozjačija and the larger part of Pčinja). Among the granted villages, still existing today in Sredorek, were: Ruǵince, Dejlovce and Vračevce.

Serbian geographer and sociologist Jovan Cvijić travelled and studied the lands, and included the region of Sredorek (chapter "Средорек, Страцин и Славиште"). Jovan Hadži-Vasiljević also travelled and studied the lands.

== Bibliography ==
- Blagojević, Miloš (2007). "Zakon gospodina Konstantina i carice Jevdokije" (PDF). Recueil des travaux de l'Institut d'études byzantines. 44. Belgrade: Institute for Byzantine Studies of the Serbian Academy of Sciences and Arts. Archived from the original (PDF) on 2014-03-04.
