= Kumanovo uprising =

1878 uprising in Kosovo vilayet

- Part of Ottoman–Serbian Wars
Date	20 January – 20 May 1878 (4 months)
Location	districts (kaza) of Kumanovo, Kriva Palanka and Kratovo, in Kosovo Vilayet, Ottoman Empire (modern North Macedonia) 42.1358°N 21.7181°E
Result	Ottoman victory

Belligerents
(Principality of Serbia) Serb rebels	Ottoman Empire

Commanders and leaders
See note	(Ottoman Empire) Hafuz Pasha

Strength
c. 1,000 (21 January)	1,000

Casualties and losses
Unknown number of deaths, 150 POW (20 May)	Unknown
- Location of Kumanovo in North Macedonia

The Kumanovo uprising was an uprising organized by an assembly of chiefs of the districts (Ottoman kaza) of Kumanovo, Kriva Palanka, and Kratovo in the Vilayet of Kosovo (in modern-day North Macedonia) in 1878. The movement sought to liberate the region from the hands of the Ottoman Empire. Following the Serbian Army's liberation of Niš on 12 January 1877, the rebellion began on 20 January 1878 with guerrilla operations during the army's liberation of Vranje. The rebels received secret aid from the Serbian government. The uprising lasted four months until its suppression by the Ottomans on 20 May, during which the Ottomans retaliated with atrocities on the local population.

== Background ==
=== Serbian-Ottoman War ===
The Herzegovina Uprising (1875–1877), backed unofficially by the states of Serbia and Montenegro, sparked a series of rebellions against the Ottoman Empire throughout Europe, such as the Bulgarian April Uprising and that of Velika Begovica. Serbia and Montenegro jointly declared war on the Ottoman Empire on 18 June 1876. Throughout the following two months, the ill-prepared and poorly equipped Serbian Army, though aided by Russian volunteers, failed to achieve offensive objectives. However, the army did manage to repulse the Ottoman offensive into Serbia, and on 26 August, Serbia pleaded European powers to mediate in ending the war. An ultimatum given by European powers forced the Ottoman Porte to give Serbia a one-month ceasefire and start peace negotiations. The Turkish peace conditions, however, were refused by European powers as too harsh. In early October, after the truce had expired, the Ottoman Army resumed its offensive and the Serbs quickly became desperate. As a result, on 31 October 1876, Russia issued an ultimatum requiring the Ottoman Empire to stop hostilities and sign a new truce with Serbia within 48 hours, a demand backed by the mobilization of up to 20 divisions of the Russian Army. Sultan Abdul Hamid II accepted the conditions of the ultimatum, however, the Ottoman brutality in the war and the violent suppression of the Herzegovina Uprising provoked political pressure within Russia, which saw itself as the protector of the Serbs, to act against the Ottoman Empire. This led to the Russo-Turkish War (24 April 1877 – 3 March 1878). The Serbian Army advanced into Old Serbia and liberated Niš on 12 January 1878 and then Vranje on 31 January 1878.

The wars of Serbia and Montenegro, and then Russia, against the Ottomans motivated liberation movements among the people in Kosovo and Metohija and Macedonia (known at the time as "Old Serbia" or "southern Serbia"). Serbia sought to liberate the Kosovo Vilayet (sanjaks of Niš, Prizren, Skopje and Novi Pazar). The Serbian Army was joined by southern Serbs who made up special volunteer detachments, a large number being from Macedonia, who wanted to liberate their home regions and unify them with Serbia. These volunteers were infiltrated into the Kumanovo and Kriva Palanka districts. When peace was signed between the Serbs and Ottomans, these groups conducted independent guerrilla fighting under the Serbian flag, which they carried and flew far south of the demarcation line. The Serbian advance in Old Serbia (1877–1878) was followed with uprisings for the Serbian cause in the region, including a notable one that broke out in the counties of Kumanovo, Kriva Palanka, and Kratovo.

=== Prelude ===
Following the Serbian liberation of Niš, Kumanovo villagers awaited the Serbian Army as it approached Vranje and Kosovo. Serbian artillery fire was heard throughout the winter of 1877–1878. Ottoman Albanian troops from Debar and Tetovo fled the front and crossed the Pčinja, looting and raping along the way.

On 18 January 1878, seventeen armed Albanians descended from the mountains into the village of Oslare. They first arrived at the house of Arsa Stojković, which they looted and emptied before the owner's eyes, enraging him and causing him to punch one of the Albanians. He was shot in the stomach, but still alive, he took a stake to his shooter's head, dying with him. The local villagers then quickly entered an armed conflict with the Albanians, killing them.

On 19 January 1878, forty Albanian deserters retreating from the Ottoman army broke into the house of elder Taško, a serf living near Bujanovac, tied up the males, raped his two daughters and two daughters-in-law, and then proceeded to loot the house and leave the village. Taško armed himself and persuaded the village to retaliate, tracing the attackers' prints through the snow. The first group of attackers, six of them, were found drunk at Lukarce, where they were beaten to death. They eventually killed all forty.

This small group of retaliatory villagers quickly grew into an uprising, with the rebels riding armed on horseback through the villages of Kumanovo and Kriva Palanka. The movement was strengthened when Mladen Piljinski and his followers killed a group of Ottoman Albanian haramibaşı, Bajram Straž and his seven friends, whose severed heads were bought as trophies and used as flags in the villages.

== Revolt ==
On 20 January 1878, the rebels chose Orthodox priest Dimitrije Paunović, from Staro Nagoričane, and Veljan Cvetković, from Strnovac, as their leaders. The revolt was organized and led by the district chiefs of Kumanovo, Kriva Palanka, and Kratovo. The prominent rebels from Kumanovo swore oath in the local church to fight for the Serbian cause until their deaths. One such rebel was the wealthy merchant Denko Krstić (1824–1882) of Mlado Nagoričane, one of the most influential people of Kumanovo in his time. On the morning of 21 January, the Serbian army entered the villages of Četirce and Nikuljane, to the excitement of the locals, who rallied on the icy banks of the river Pčinja. The rebels, who numbered ca. 1,000, met up with the volunteers in the Serbian army. In the following days, the Serbian army was halted after the Russians, their allies, made peace with the Ottomans. Meanwhile, on 26 January, Christian refugees from Albanian-inhabited villages traveled to Pristina with news that Serbian outposts had been erected in Gračanica. That same day, armed Albanians gathered in the Serb-inhabited mahala (quarter) of Panađurište in Pristina and started a massacre of Serbs. Under pressure from the British, Russia accepted the truce offered by the Ottoman Empire on 31 January 1878, but continued to move towards Constantinople.

The rebels had cleared the counties of Kumanovo and Palanka of Turks and Albanians, but following the peace treaty, beys, hodjas, soldiers, and refugees started to return to their houses. In early February, groups of returned refugees gathered in the Kumanovo graveyard planning a massacre of the Serbs in the town, but at dusk the following day, some 200 Serb rebels arrived in the vineyards to prevent the massacre. Gunfire was exchanged, and two Ottoman jandarma (gendarmerie) were killed by the rebels.

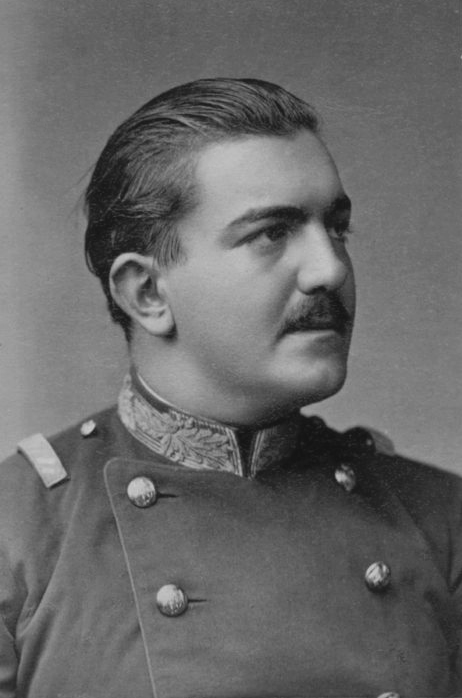
The rebels appealed to Prince Milan IV (photograph taken 1870—80)

Rebels and prominent members of forty Serb villages gathered at the Zabel monastery in Nikuljane, where they decided to petition Prince Milan IV of Serbia for weapons. In exchange for his support, they pledged their devotion, loyalty, and future union with Serbia. They also appealed to the Serbian generals, asking them to secretly supply them with arms and ammunition. Also, at the house of prota Dimitrije in Kumanovo, ten veterans swore on the Bible that they would not give up their fight, kissed each other, and wrote a request to Prince Milan that Kumanovo and its surroundings be unified Serbia. The petition, sewn into the saddle of Tasa Kostić-Civković, was brought to Serbian outposts via the Monastery of St. Prohor Pčinjski, a later rebel center. At that time, two other rebel envoys arrived at the village of Rataje near Vranje and met with General Jovan Belimarković, whom they asked for weapons. The general promised them 2,000 guns, which were to be received at the Prohor Pčinjski Monastery.

Upon hearing that they would receive weapons, the rebels were approached by villagers from Palanka and Kratovo, all the way to Deve Bair, the site of the Russian demarcation line. These villages had not been overtaken by the Bulgarian Exarchate. 4,000 Serbs gathered on the icy fields of Palanka and Kumanovo. Bulgaria was alarmed by the Kumanovo rebels, and sent their agents to turn them over to the Exarchate. Exarchist clergyman Mihajlo attempted to convince the rebels to turn themselves in to Bulgarian officials, but the outraged villagers attacked him upon hearing him. He was acquitted of capital charges, but still exiled, by the rebel court in Zabel. He died shortly after in Bulgaria from the beating. The conflict then intensified. Albanian troops were sent to St. Parascheva hill on the Četirce and Nikuljane height, but were defeated and returned. Haramibaşı Fehat (or Fetah) from Mutlovo, a girl named Halime, and a group of seven relatives, traveled to a house near Kozjak in an attempt to kill Velika Begovica, a notable female rebel. They did not find Begovica, but encountered Veljan Strnovski and Jaćim Čelopečki, whom they fought but failed to kill. Haramibaşı Fehat and approximately twenty others were then killed in forests near Četirce, with Fehat being shot in the heart with two bullets. After surviving his fight, Čelopečki tied the heads of fallen rebels to his donkey. The remaining Albanians carried Fehat's corpse into Mutlovo. Halime died, following a blown out knee.

At this point, the Ottomans in Istanbul, in addition to the Bulgarians, began to fear the Kumanovo rebels. Messages were sent and amnesty was offered. However, the two Ottoman delegates that were sent to Zabel had to inform the Porte that the rebels rejected all offers and said that they would fight until unification with Serbia or death. The desire for unification among southern Serbs began to intensify, prompting peasants from distant regions to join the rebels. The rebels again petitioned Prince Milan, and the Russian Emperor, for unification with Serbia.

With the Treaty of San Stefano on 3 March 1878 and announced establishment of Greater Bulgaria, more appeals were sent to Prince Milan for the unification of Macedonia with Serbia, against the threat of Bulgaria claiming Macedonia. On 10 May, an assembly was gathered, in which the representatives of the nahiya of Skopje, Tetovo, Debar, Kičevo, Prilep, Kratovo, Kočani, Štip, Veles, and Kriva Reka, among others, including the rebel leaders, kmets, and clergy, signed a petition addressed to Prince Milan, the Berlin Congress, and Russia, for the annexation of those territories to Serbia. They asked Prince Milan "on their knees" to unite "our land and the Holy Mother Serbia, and to not replace the hard and grim Turkish (Ottoman) enslavement with the worser and darker Bulgarian one". They also wrote that the inhabitants of the nahiye were "pure Serbs", and that "our land, Old Serbia, is real and pure, which is evident from the only and pure Serb monuments, which there are plenty of in our lands", and enumerated several such churches and monasteries in those nahiye. There were 170 signatures with another 44 official Ottoman municipal seals.

As the Berlin Congress, which began on 13 June, approached, the Porte decided to destroy the uprising, which became an increasing risk to the Ottoman Empire. On orders from Istanbul, brigadier-general Hafuz Pasha departed from Pristina, and led five Ottoman camps with new cannon guns against the rebels. He had led a brigade that suppressed the April Uprising of 1876.

On 20 May, the rebels, aware of their powerlessness, awaited Hafuz Pasha on the outskirts of rebel territory on St. Parascheva hill. The cannon fire, as "deadly meteorites", broke up the rebel resistance. The rebels once again defended themselves on the warm and bare Čelopek. Under the clear sky, a white and dense cloud "covered their defeat". In the twilight of firebombing and cannon fire, the peasants fled for their children and wives in the villages. People recklessly went for the mountains for sheltering, while others, distraught, threw themselves down the steep river sides of the Pčinja, which was said to have become red of blood. Young women and girls drowned.

The Ottoman retaliation was large, and "unprecedented atrocities and evilness fell on the rebel land". Captured rebels were killed in cruel manners. Women, girls, children, and young boys were raped. Girls were taken to Ottoman camps where, naked, they served the soldiers wine and performed sexual acts. The elderly were lashed until they collapsed. Young peasants were tied by their feet and roasted over a fire, with flies swarming on their open wounds. By sunrise around 900 houses in the community were burning. The rebels lost the last of their held territory upon their defeat by Hafuz Pasha on 20 May 1878.

Three columns of chained, captured rebels, numbering 150 people, were led down the dusty Skopje road by Ottoman soldiers drunk on victory and the peasants' rakija. They walked towards Pristina, but most of the rebels died on the way. The soldiers pierced the remained captives' bodies with their bayonets, and left them to die on the road.

Surviving rebels hid in the Kozjak and Đerman. Several rebel leaders and their followers managed to escape into Serbia, where they settled in the depopulated counties of Toplica and Vranje, and lived "hungry and humiliated... [while] help and awards were given to serve as pandurs" (policemen). Veljan and Jaćim left their houses, families, and friends, to live lonely, unknown, poor lives in Vranje.

Following the uprising, the Ottoman government most notably prohibited the use of the appellation "Serbian". Also, Serbian nationalism in Macedonia was persecuted, while Bulgarian propaganda in the region became more common. Mass migrations from Macedonia into Serbia followed after reprisals, with their former villages being settled by Albanians (such as in Matejche, Otlja, Kosmatec, Murgash and others).

== Aftermath ==
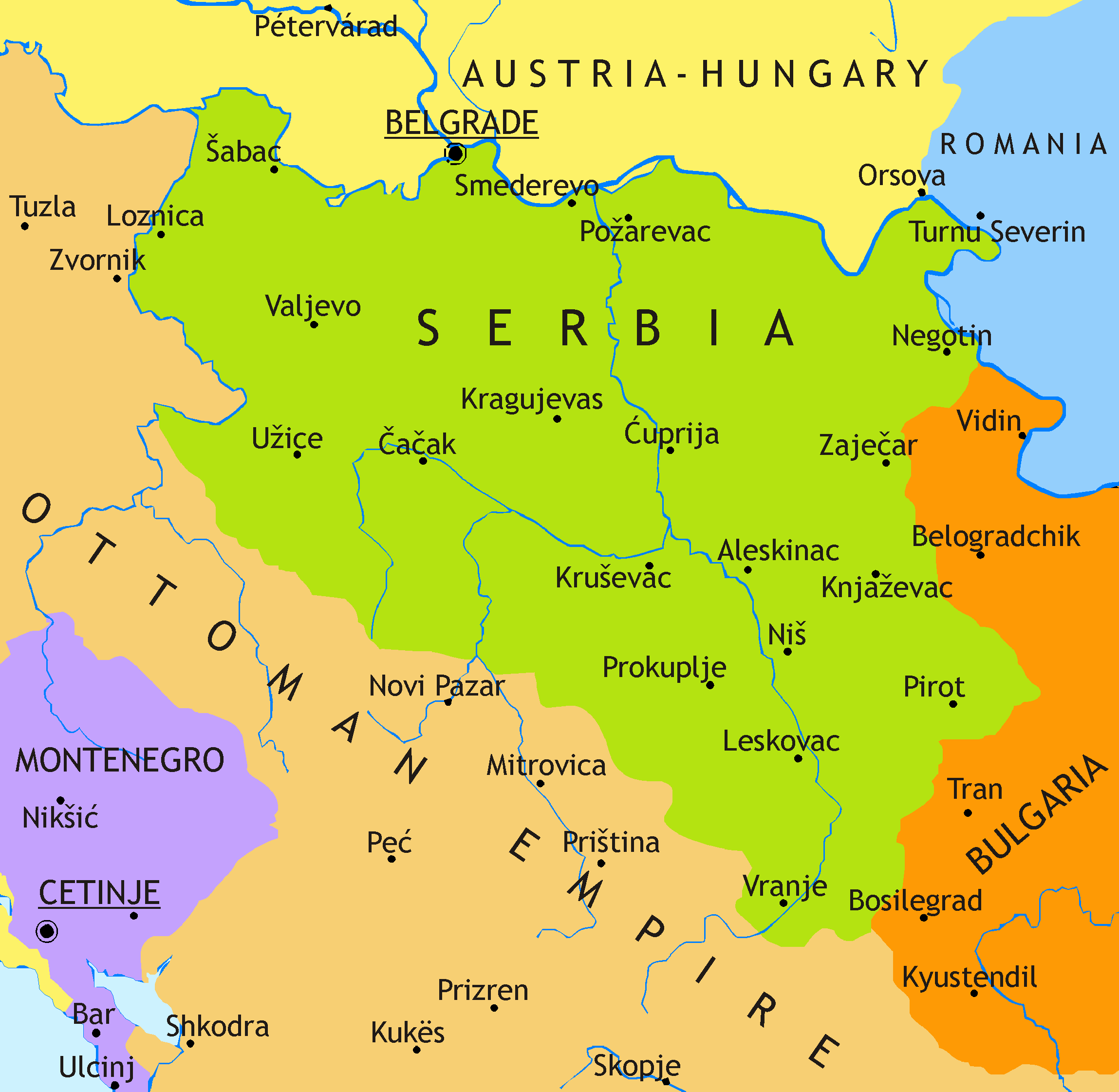
Principality of Serbia in 1878.

After the uprising, Serbs in the Vranje region signed a memorandum on joining Serbia. A notable local, Stamenko Stošić Torovela, took the memorandum to Nikolay Pavlovich Ignatyev, a Russian official and main Bulgarian supporter. Ignatijev, rejecting it, threw the memorandum back in the face of Torovela, who managed to flee across the Bulgarian border from Bulgarian agents who sought to kill him.

On 15 June 1878, an assembly was held at Zelenikovo, southeast from Skopje, where 5,000 villagers from the nahiye of Veles, Skopje, and Tikveš, requested unification with Serbia from Prince Milan IV. The request came with 800 municipality, church, and monastery seals, as well as 5,000 signatures, fingerprints, and crosses. Unfortunately, the carrier delivering the message was intercepted on 16 June on the Skopje-Kumanovo road, by an Ottoman gendarmerie that had been tipped off by a Bulgarian teacher. There was a shootout, and when the carrier's bullets had run out, he ripped and swallowed some of the papers before being shot. Most of the petition was destroyed; however, 600 signatures were identified, and 200 of the identified signatories were immediately killed, while the rest were imprisoned and died in prison. 50 such prisoners later being released from Ottoman casemates.

Petitions were later sent from all parts of Macedonia to the Congress of Berlin (13 June – 13 July 1878) stating that Macedonia should unite with Serbia and that it did not belong to any other country. The official statement reads:

As Serbs of true and pure stock, of the purest and most intrinsically Serbian country... We for the last time implore on our knees... That we may in some manner and by some means be freed from the slavery of five centuries, and united with our country, the Principality of Serbia, and that the tears of blood of the Serbian martyrs may be stanched so that they, too, may become useful members of the European community of nations and of the Christian world; we do not desire to exchange the harsh Turkish slavery for the vastly harsher and darker Bulgarian slavery, which will be worse and more intolerable than that of the Turks which we are at present enduring, and will compel us in the end either to slay all our own people, or to abandon our country, to abandon our holy places, and graves, and all that we hold dear...

After the war, the Serbian military government sent armament and aid to rebels in Kosovo and Macedonia. Christian rebel bands were formed all over the region. Many of those bands, privately organized and aided by the government, were established in Serbia and crossed into Ottoman territory.

At the beginning of 1880, some 65 rebel leaders (glavari), from almost all provinces in southern Old Serbia and Macedonia, sent an appeal to M. S. Milojević, the former commander of volunteers in the Serbian–Ottoman Wars of 1876–1878, asking him to, with requesting from the Serbian government, prepare 1,000 rifles and ammunition for them, that Milojević be commander of the rebels and that they be allowed to cross the border and start the rebellion. The leaders were among the most influential in the districts of Kumanovo, Kriva Palanka, Kočani, Štip, Veles, Prilep, Bitola, Ohrid, Kičevo and Skopje. The appeal was signed by Spiro Crne, Mihajlo Čakre, Dime Ristić-Šiće, Mladen Stojanović "Čakr-paša", Čerkez Ilija, Davče Trajković, and 59 other rebels and former volunteers in the Serbian army. The reply from the Serbian government is unknown; it is possible that it did not reply. From these intentions, only in the Poreče region, an ethnically uniform compact province, a larger result was achieved. In Poreče, whole villages turned on the Ottomans. Viewed of as a continuation of the Kumanovo Uprising, the Brsjak Revolt began on 14 October 1880, and broke out in the nahiya of Kičevo, Poreče, Bitola and Prilep. The movement was active for little more than a year, finally being suppressed by the Ottoman jandarma (gendarmerie).

== Legacy ==
The uprising is commemorated in epic poetry from Macedonia.

== Annotations ==
1. Name: The uprising is simply known as the Kumanovo Uprising (Serbian: Kumanovski ustanak/Кумановски устанак, Macedonian: Kumanovsko vostanie/Кумановско востание). It is also known as the Uprising- or Insurrection of Serbs in the Kumanovo and Palanka Districts.
2. Commanders and leaders
  - Dimitrije Pop Paunović (Dimko Nagorički), Orthodox priest from Staro Nagoričane, founder
  - Veljan Cvetković (Veljan Strnovski, Čiča Veljan), from Strnovac, founder and rebel leader
  - Jaćim (Čelopečki), from Čelopek, rebel leader
  - A contemporary poem enumerates the following leaders: Dimko Nagorički, Veljan Strnovski, Jaćim Čelopečki, Dimiško, Peša Jovanovski, Mladen Čakr-paša, Nikola Algunjski, Vukadin Miljkinski, priest Spasa Peljinski, Đorđe Vragoturski, Krsto Dragomanski, Apostol Žegnjanski, Stoša from Stepance, Mladenko Begovski, Spaso from Ramno, Đele Arbanaški, Leksa Dlibočički.
  Other people
  - Stojan Vezenković, Serbian agent, planner
  - Denko Krstić, merchant

== Sources ==
- Georgevitch, T. R. (1918). Macedonia. Forgotten Books. ISBN 978-1-4400-6519-4.
- Hadži-Vasiljević, Jovan (1906). Устанак Срба у Кумановској и Паланачкој кази у 1878. години.
- Hadži-Vasiljević, Jovan (1909). Kumanovo.
- Institut za savremenu istoriju (2007). Gerila na Balkanu. Tokyo: Institute for Disarmament and Peace Studies.
- Jovanović, Aleksa (1937). Spomenica dvadesetogodišnjice oslobodjenja Južne Srbije, 1912-1937. Južna Srbija.
- Krakov, Stanislav (1990) [1930]. Plamen četništva. Belgrade: Hipnos.
- Matica srpska (1992). Zbornik Matice srpske za istoriju 45–48. Novi Sad: Matica srpska.
- Milić, Danica (1980). Srbija u završnoj fazi Velike istočne krize 1877-1878. Prosveta. p. 159.
- Popović, Zarija R. (1900). Pred Kosovom: beleške iz doba 1874-1878 godine. Drž. štamp. Kralj. Srbije.
- Trbić, Vasilije (1996). Memoari: 1898–1912. Kultura.
- Vojvodić, Mihajlo (1978). Србија 1878: документи. Српска књижевна задруга.
- Hadži-Vasiljević, Jovan (1928). Četnička akcija u Staroj Srbiji i Maćedoniji (in Serbian). Belgrade: Sv. Sava.
