= Nikuljane =

Nikuljane Никуљане
- Village
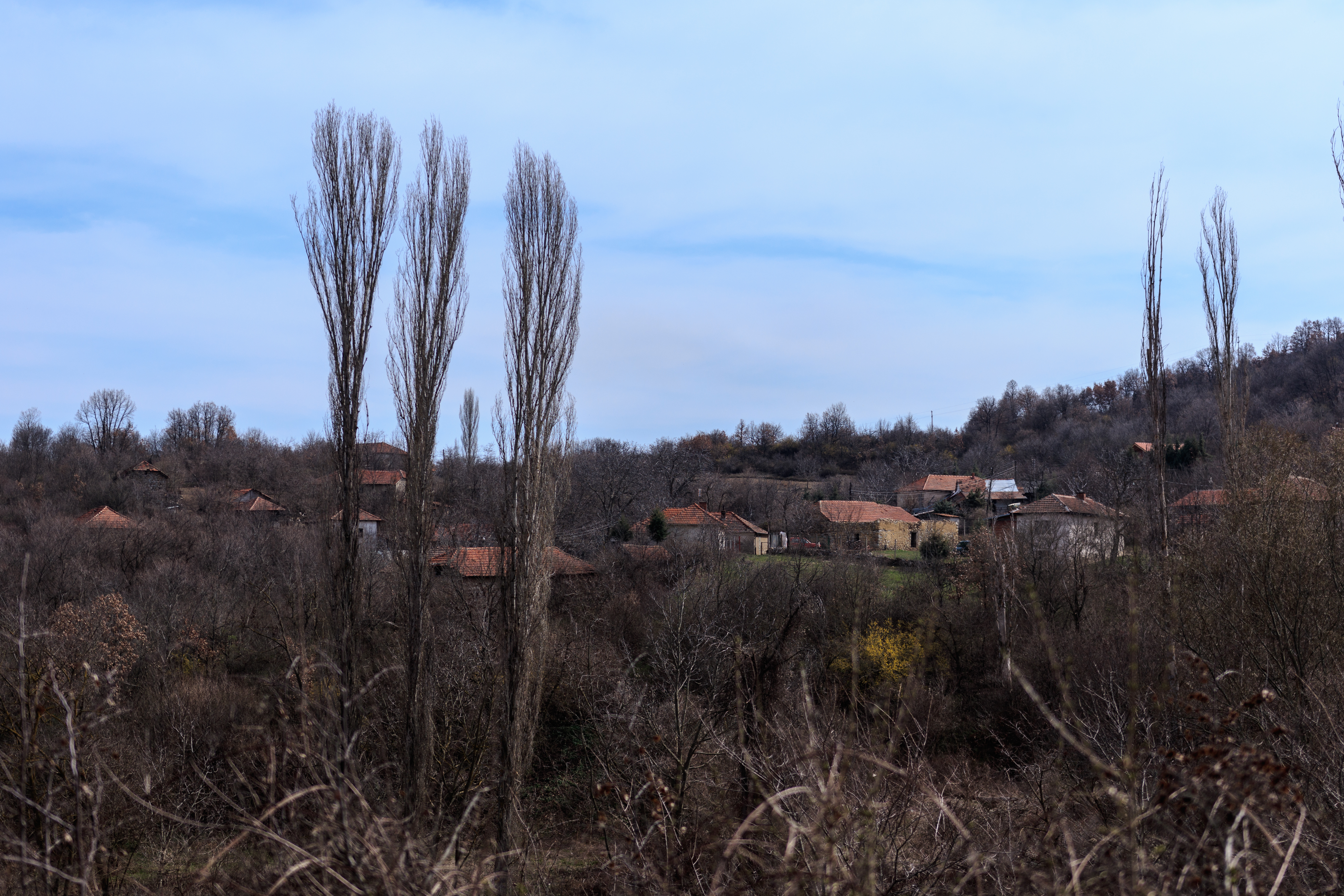
- View of the village Nikuljane

- Location within North Macedonia
- Coordinates: 42°13′0″N 21°47′58″E
- Country: North Macedonia
- Region: Northeastern
- Municipality: Staro Nagoričane
- Elevation: 520 m (1,710 ft)

Population (2002)
  - Total: 210
- Time zone: UTC+1 (CET)
  - Summer (DST): UTC+2 (CEST)
- Car plates: KU

Nikuljane (Macedonian: Никуљане) is a village in northeastern North Macedonia, in the municipality of Staro Nagoričane. According to the 2002 census, it had 210 inhabitants.

== Geography ==
The village is located in northernmost North Macedonia, close to the Serbian border (5 kilometres). To the nearest city, it is 12 kilometres northeast of Kumanovo. Nikuljane is situated in the historical region of Sredorek, in the Rujen mountain region, on ca. 520 m above sea. The Pčinja river flows east of the village.

It borders Četirce, Suševo, Algunja, Čelopek and Mlado Nagoričane.

The Zabel Monastery is located 2 kilometres from the village.

== History ==
In the 19th century, it was part of the Ottoman kaza of Kumanovo. The village supported the Kumanovo Uprising (January 20–May 20, 1878).

In 1905, the village was Serb, adhering to the Patriarchate of Constantinople. It had 560 inhabitants and a Serbian school.

== Demographics ==
According to the 2002 census, it had 210 inhabitants, the majority of whom declared as Serbs (98%), the rest as Macedonians (2%). The families are Eastern Orthodox Christian. In the 1994 census, it had N/A inhabitants.

== Anthropology ==
The oldest families came from the Gnjilane region in Kosovo. The village slava is St. Elijah's Day and Feast of the Ascension.
