= Petar Koćura =

Member of the Serbian Chetnik Organization

Petar Krstić (Serbian Cyrillic: Петар Крстић), known as Petar Koćura (Петар Коћура) was a member of the Serbian Chetnik Organization. He belonged to the Deda-Stojkovci family in Koćura near Vranje. During the office of Alimpije Marjanović as Chief of the Mountainous Headquarters (1908), the notable regional commanders (vojvode) were Petar Krstić-Koćura, Todor Krstić-Algunjski, Vasilije Trbić, Petko Nagorički, Vojislav Tankosić, Vojin Popović and others.

== See also ==
- List of Chetnik voivodes

== Sources ==
- Đurić, Veljko Đ.; Mijović, Miličko (1993). Ilustrovana istorija četničkog pokreta. Narodna knj.
