= Strnovac =

Strnovac Стрновац
- Village
- Location within North Macedonia
- Coordinates: 42°11′50″N 21°51′42″E
- Country: North Macedonia
- Region: Northeastern
- Municipality: Staro Nagoričane
- Elevation: 376 m (1,234 ft)

Population (2002)
  - Total: 93
- Time zone: UTC+1 (CET)
  - Summer (DST): UTC+2 (CEST)
- Postal code: 1303
- Car plates: KU

Strnovac (Macedonian: Стрновац) is a village in northeastern North Macedonia, in the municipality of Staro Nagoričane. According to the 2002 census, it had 93 inhabitants.

== Geography ==
The village is located in northern North Macedonia. To the nearest city, it is 15 kilometres northeast of Kumanovo. Nikuljane is situated in the historical region of Sredorek, in the Rujen mountain region, on ca. 380 m above sea. The Pčinja river flows east of the village.

The cadastral area of Strnovac borders the town of Staro Nagoričane to the west, Dragomance to the north, Dobrača to the northeast, Makreš to the southeast, and Mlado Nagoričane to the southwest.

== History ==
In the 19th century, it was part of the Ottoman kaza of Kumanovo. The village supported the Kumanovo Uprising (January 20–May 20, 1878), local Veljan Cvetković was one of the founding leaders.

In 1905, the village was Serb, adhering to the Patriarchate of Constantinople, with 160 inhabitants.

== Demographics ==
According to the 2002 census, it had 93 inhabitants, the majority of whom declared as Macedonians (94%), the rest as Serbs (6%). The families are Eastern Orthodox Christian. In the 1994 census, it had N/A inhabitants.
