= Kumanovo district (Ottoman) =

- District of Ottoman Empire
- 1867–1913
- Flag Coat of arms
- Capital: Kumanovo
- History
  - Established: 1867
  - Treaty of London (1913): 30 May 1913
Preceded by	Succeeded by
Rumelia Eyalet	Kingdom of Serbia
- Today part of: North Macedonia

The Kumanovo district (Turkish: Kumanova, Serbian: Кумановска каза/Kumanovska kaza) was a kaza (district) in the Sanjak of Üsküp (Skopje) of the Ottoman Empire. It was formed in 1867, during the reign of Abdülaziz I. It was dissolved in 1912. The district had 3 divisions: Karadak, Kozjak and Ovče Pole.

== History ==
The district was established in 1867, during the reign of Abdülaziz I.

The Orthodox population was adherent to the Patriarchate of Constantinople, the district being ecclesiastically supervised by the churchwarden (ikonom) and archpriest Dimitrije Mladenović since 1833.

With the Serbian advance into the Kosovo Vilayet during the Serbian–Ottoman War (1876–78), and atrocities carried out by retreating Ottoman Albanian troops in the region, the Kumanovo Uprising broke out in the districts of Kumanovo, Kriva Palanka and Kratovo. It was organized by leading citizens of the districts, and was fought in the Serbian cause; the rebels sought the annexation of Macedonia to the Principality of Serbia. It was suppressed by May 1878 with tremendous Ottoman retaliation against the civilian population.

After the death of churchwarden Dimitrije (1880), Denko Krstić succeeded as the ikonom of Kumanovo. Krstić was an influential merchant and Serbian national worker, who as a patron of Serbs in the Kumanovo region and involvement in the Kumanovo Uprising and Brsjak Revolt was imprisoned by the Ottomans, having died in prison in 1882.

== Population ==
According to a 1900 source, the district was inhabited by 48,321 people, out of whom 34,191 were Christian Bulgarians, c. 500 were Muslim Bulgarians, 6,150 were Turks, c. 300 were Muslim Circassians, 6,166 were Muslim Albanians, c. 50 were Christian Vlachs, c. 30 were Jews, and 1,034 were Muslim and Christian Romani.

== Notable people ==
- Velika Begovica (fl. 1876–78), female rebel leader
- Mladen Čakr-paša (fl. 1876–d. 1885), rebel leader, born in Gornji Stajevac.
- Denko Krstić (1824–1882), influential merchant, born in Mlado Nagoričane.
- Petko Ilić (1886–1912), guerilla fighter, born in Staro Nagoričane.
- Todor Krstić-Algunjski (d. after 1918), guerilla fighter, born in Algunja.
- Ditko Aleksić (d. 1916), guerilla fighter, born in Osiče.
- Jovan Dovezenski (1873–1935), guerilla fighter, born in Dovezence.
- Pavle Mladenović (d. 1905), guerilla fighter, born in Jačince.
- Dimitrije Mladenović (1794–1880), Orthodox archpriest, born in Proevce.

== Sources ==
- Hadži-Vasiljević, Jovan (1909). Južna stara Srbija: istorijska, etnografska i politička istraživanja, knjiga prva. Nova stamparija Davidović. (e-book)
- Hadži-Vasiljević, Jovan (1930). Скопље и његова околина: историска, етнографска и културно политичка излагања. Штампарија "Св. Сава.
