= Orah =

Orah (Serbo-Croatian for "walnut") may refer to:

== Places ==
Bosnia and Herzegovina

- Orah, Bileća, a village in Bileća, Republika Srpska
- Orah, Rudo, a village in Rudo, Republika Srpska
- Orah, Ravno, a village in Ravno, Federation of Bosnia and Herzegovina
- Orah, Vareš, a village in Vareš, Federation of Bosnia and Herzegovina
- Orah Lake, a lake of Bosnia and Herzegovina

Croatia

- Orah, Vrgorac, a village in Vrgorac

Montenegro

- Orah, Berane, a village in Berane
- Orah, Nikšić, a village in Nikšić

North Macedonia

- Orah, Staro Nagoričane, a village

== Other uses ==
- ORaH, Croatian Sustainable Development, a green political party in Croatia
- Orah Dee Clark (1875–1965), American educator
- Michael Orah (born 1985), Indonesian footballer

== See also ==
- Oreh
