= Velika Begovica =

Velika Begovica (Serbian Cyrillic: Велика Беговица; fl. 1876–78) was a female rebel in the Kozjak region, which was under Ottoman rule (today part of North Macedonia), active during the Serbo-Turkish War (1876–78). She was born in Ramno (Staro Nagoričane) or Malotino (Kumanovo).

== See also ==
- Kumanovo Uprising
- Čakr-paša
