= Oreh =

Oreh may refer to:

- Oreh, Bulgaria, a village in Kardzhali Province
- Adaeze Oreh (born 1979), Nigerian physician and politician

== See also ==
- Orah (disambiguation)
