= Vračevce =

Vračevce Врачевце
- Settlement
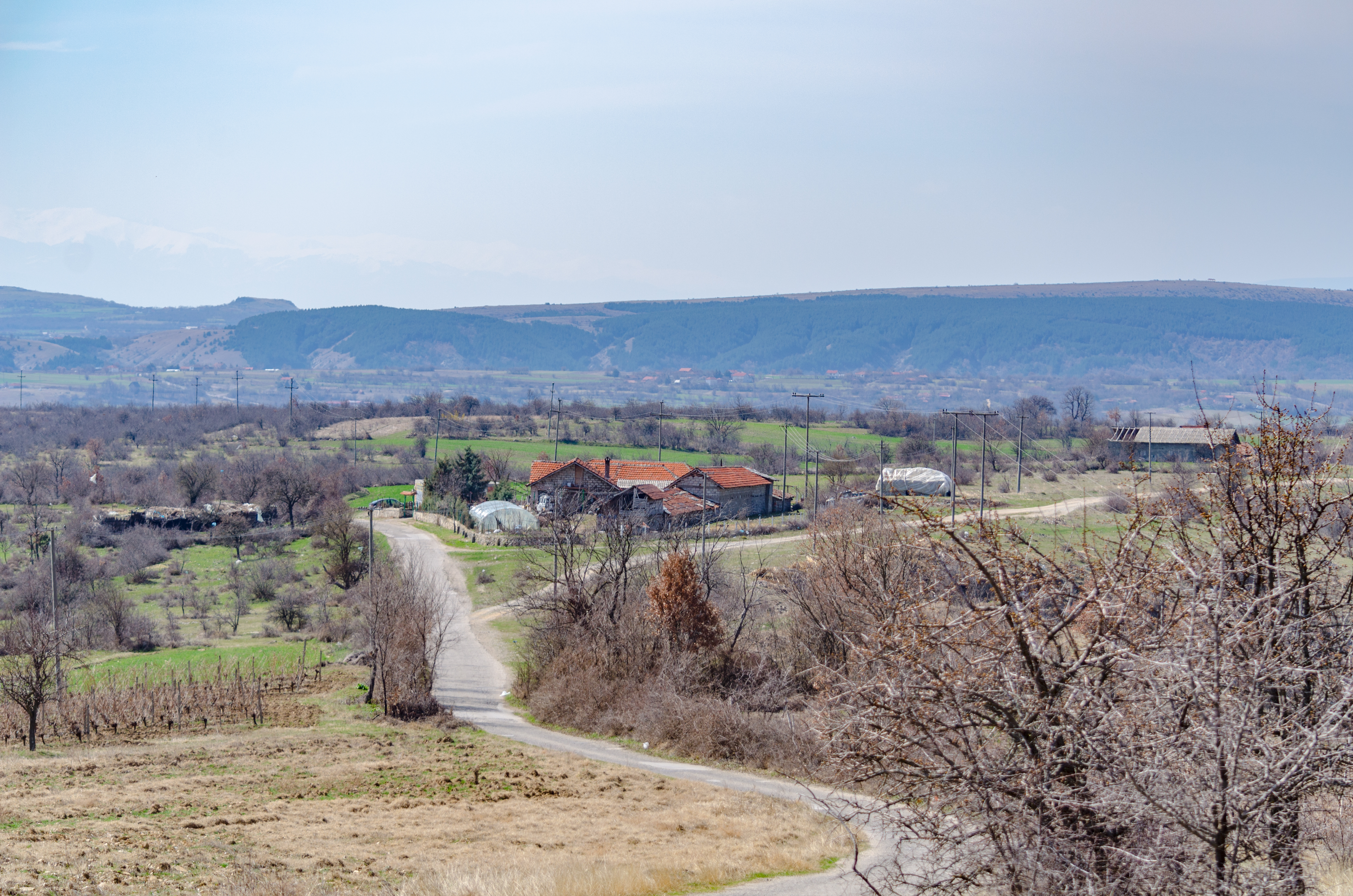
- Part of the village

- Location within North Macedonia
- Coordinates: 42°14′18″N 21°52′42″E
- Country: North Macedonia
- Region: Northeastern
- Municipality: Staro Nagoričane
- Elevation: 430 m (1,410 ft)

Population (2002)
  - Total: 22
- Time zone: UTC+1 (CET)
  - Summer (DST): UTC+2 (CEST)
- Car plates: KU

Vračevce (Macedonian: Врачевце) is a small village in the municipality of Staro Nagoričane, North Macedonia.

== Geography ==
To the nearest city, the settlement is 17 kilometres northeast of Kumanovo. Vračevce is situated in the historical region of Sredorek, in the Kozjak mountain region (Kozjačija), on ca. 430 m above sea. The Pčinja river flows east of the village.

== History ==
In Serbian Emperor Stefan Dušan's (r. 1331–55) confirmed on 10 August 1354, several villages, settlements and arable land which was granted (metochion) by despot Dejan to his endowment, the Arhiljevica Church of the Holy Mother of God. Vrače was one of the mentioned selište (arable land). In the 1379 charter of Dejan's son Konstantin, it was not mentioned. The Kumanovo region (old Žegligovo) received its geographical location and certain settlement picture in the 14th century, during the rule of the Nemanjić and Dejanović.

== Demographics ==
According to the 2002 census, it had 22 inhabitants, all of whom declared as ethnic Macedonians. The families are Eastern Orthodox Christian. In the 1994 census, it had 25 inhabitants.

== Notable people ==
- Stanko Mladenovski (b. 1937), Yugoslav politician
