= Todor Krstić-Algunjski =

Serbian Chetnik commander

Todor Algunjski
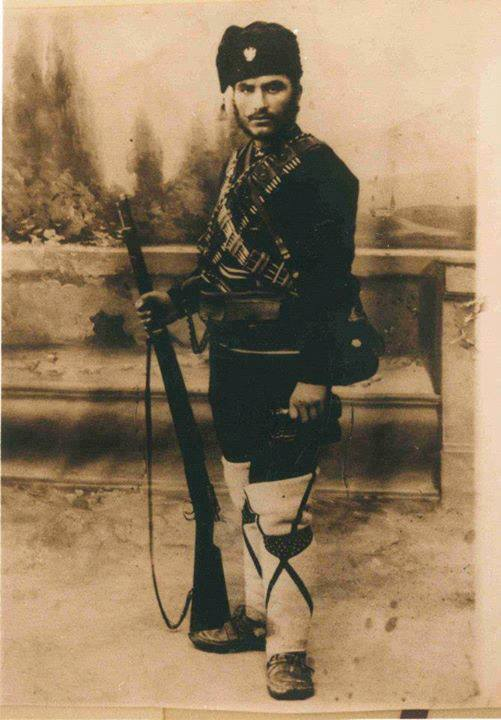
- Born: Algunja, Ottoman Empire (modern R. Macedonia)
- Military career
- Allegiance: Serbian Chetnik Organization (1903–08); (Kingdom of Serbia) Serbian Army (1912–18)
- Service years: 1904–18
- Rank: vojvoda (duke)
- Nicknames: Toša; Algunjski
- Conflicts: Macedonian Struggle

Todor Krstić (Serbian Cyrillic: Тодор Крстић; fl. 1904–34), known by the nickname Toša (Тоша) and nom de guerre Algunjski (Алгуњски), was a Serbian Chetnik commander in Old Serbia and Macedonia during the Macedonian Struggle. In Bulgaria he is considered a Bulgarian renegade who switched sides, i.e. (sic) Serboman.

== Life ==
Krstić was born in the village of Algunja in the Kosovo Vilayet of the Ottoman Empire (present-day North Macedonia). Algunja was surrounded by Albanian-inhabited villages of Čukarka, Suševo and Mutilovo; Krstić had even before joining the organized Chetnik action, jumped into the region from Vranje, assassinating known zulumćari (persecutors of Christians). On April 18, 1902, together with Krastyo Kovachev, he joined the Bulgarian cheta of the Supreme Macedonian-Adrianople Committee with a commander Sotir Atanasov, which operated in Kriva Palanka area. With this company he moved later to the Bulgarian town of Kyustendil. He and his comrades were interned under Ottoman pressure by the Bulgarian authorities in Varna and later in Kavarna. From there, Krastev left for Russia and then settled in Belgrade, Serbia. He himself became one of the regional vojvoda (duke) and worked closely with vojvoda Petko Ilić. After the Battle of Stratsin against a Bulgarian squad in March 1912, in which Petko Ilić died, Krstić succeeded him as the unit's commander. He fought in the great battle at Šumata Trnica on March 21, 1912, in which eight Serbian rebels were killed, including Svetozar Mihajlović-Purca from Tuzla.

== See also ==
- List of Chetnik voivodes

== Sources ==
- Krakov, Stanislav (1990) [1930]. Plamen četništva (in Serbian). Belgrade: Hipnos.
