= Karpino Monastery =

Macedonian Orthodox monastery near Kumanovo, North Macedonia

Coordinates: 42°11′33.81″N 21°57′49.35″E

Karpino Monastery Карпински манастир
- Air view of the monastery (2025)

Religion
- Affiliation: Macedonian Orthodox Church (Eastern Orthodox Church)
- District: Orah
- Year consecrated: 16th – 17th century

Location
- Location: village Suvi Orah, Staro Nagoričane Municipality, North Macedonia
- Interactive map of Karpino Monastery; Карпински манастир

Architecture
- Type: Middle-Byzantine
- Style: Byzantine style

The Karpino Monastery (Macedonian: Карпински манастир) is an important Macedonian Orthodox monastery situated in the northeastern part of North Macedonia, near the city of Kumanovo (near village Suvi Orah).

== History ==
The main monastery church is dedicated to Presentation of Virgin Mary, it was built of crafted stone in the shape of single nave basilica with apse in form of triconhos, from the 16th – 17th century. The church itself was according to myth erected in the 14th century by Dejan.

The monastery and church has been burnt and destroyed many times, but has always been restored by the inhabitants of villages Suv Ora, Aljince, Drenak and Kanarevo.

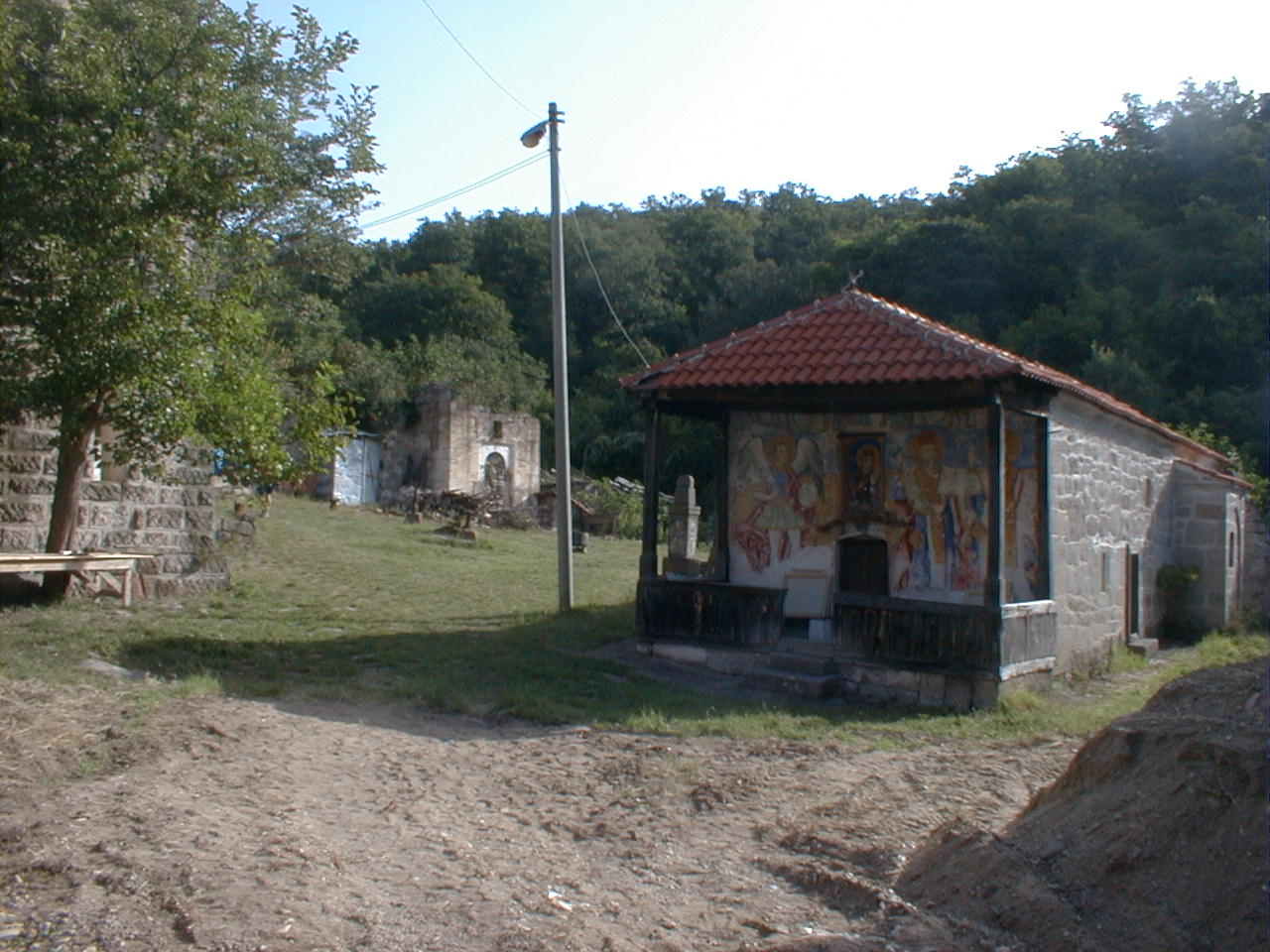
Monastery church the Holiest Mother of God Ascension

A new layer of frescoes was added to the original when the monastery was restored in 1892, however some of the original images are still visible, including Mary with baby Jesus Christ and Tiron and Theodore Stratilat.

The church preserves a valuable iconostasis in which there are 7 original icons (The Great Feasts) from 1606 to 1607, which were painted by Nikola Zoograf and his students.

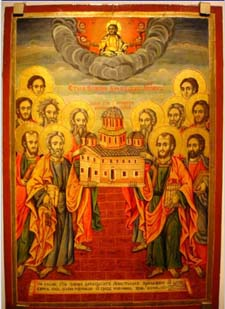
Meeting of the Apostles icon from Church

It was the most important literary and cultural centre in the Middle Ages for this part of the Kumanovo region. Around 300 monks worked at a time in the monastery and were engaged in copying church books and manuscripts. The monastery served as sanctuary for the first Macedonian school where priests received their education. In the late 19th century, the monks of Karpino Monastery began to form public school, teaching a smaller number of villages children to become literate.

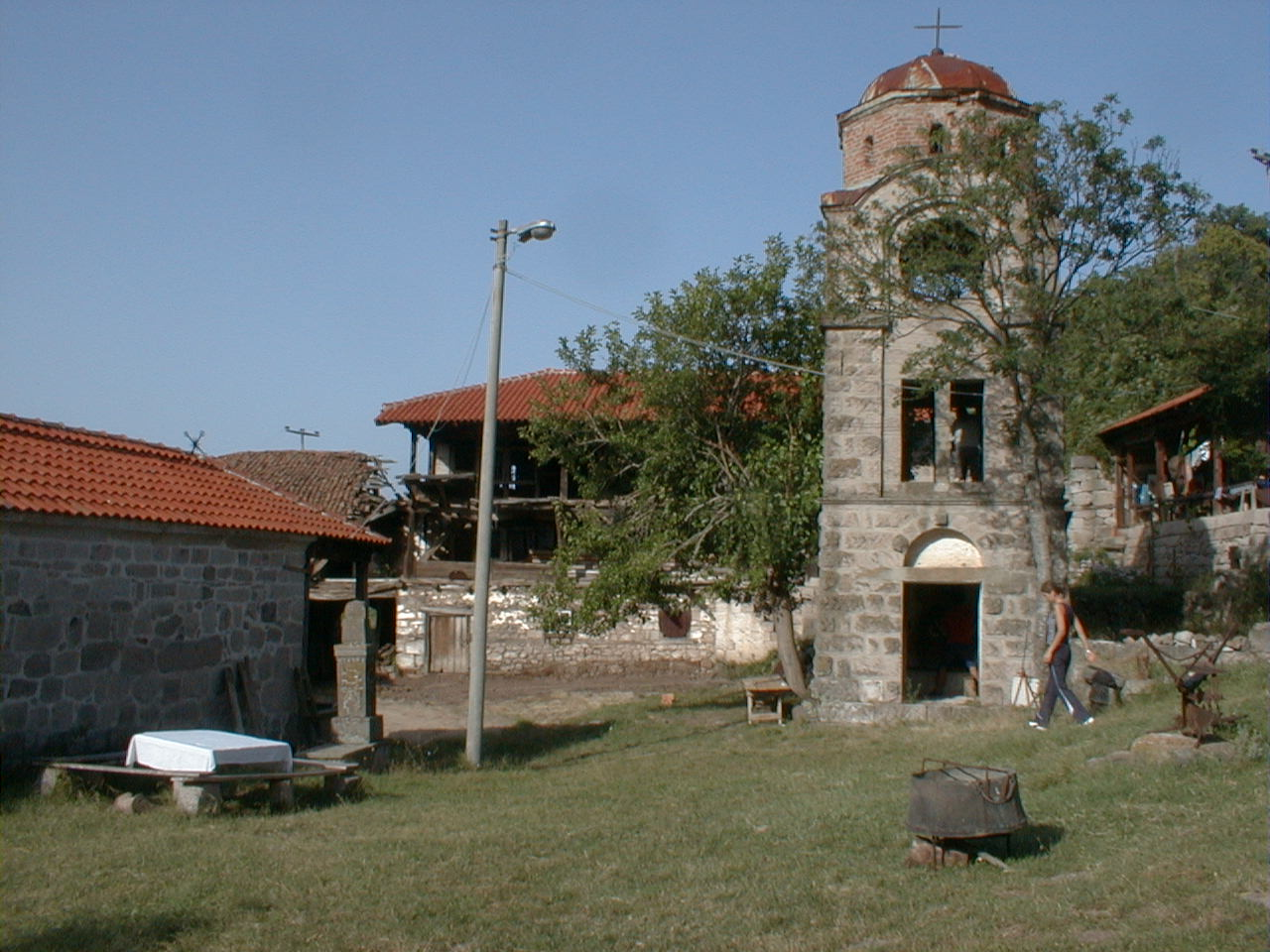
Monastery belfry

Restoration funded by the Macedonian Institute for Protection of Monuments of Culture is taking place to repair damage sustained during World War II.
