= Ruǵince =

Ruǵince Руѓинце
- Village
- Air view of the village

- Location within North Macedonia
- Coordinates: 42°8′51″N 21°58′30″E
- Country: North Macedonia
- Region: Northeastern
- Municipality: Staro Nagoričane
- Elevation: 550 m (1,800 ft)

Population (2002)
  - Total: 75
- Time zone: UTC+1 (CET)
  - Summer (DST): UTC+2 (CEST)
- Car plates: KU

Ruǵince or Ruđince (Macedonian: Руѓинце) is a settlement in northeastern North Macedonia, in the municipality of Staro Nagoričane. It used to be part of the former municipality of Klečevce.

== Geography ==
To the nearest city, the settlement is 22 kilometres east of Kumanovo. Ruǵince is situated in the historical region of Sredorek, in the Pčinja river valley, on ca. 550 m above sea. The German mountain rises to the north of the village.

== History ==
In Serbian Emperor Stefan Dušan's (r. 1331–55) confirmed on 10 August 1354, several villages, settlements and arable land which was granted (metochion) by despot Dejan to his endowment, the Arhiljevica Church of the Holy Mother of God. Ruginci was one of the mentioned selište (arable land). In the 1379 charter of Dejan's son Konstantin, it had evolved into a village. The Kumanovo region (old Žegligovo) received its geographical location and certain settlement picture in the 14th century, during the rule of the Nemanjić and Dejanović.

== Demographics ==
According to the 2002 census, it had 75 inhabitants, all of whom declared as ethnic Macedonians. The families are Eastern Orthodox Christian. In the 1994 census, it had 121 inhabitants.
