= Orah, Staro Nagoričane =

Orah Орах Suvi Orah
- Village
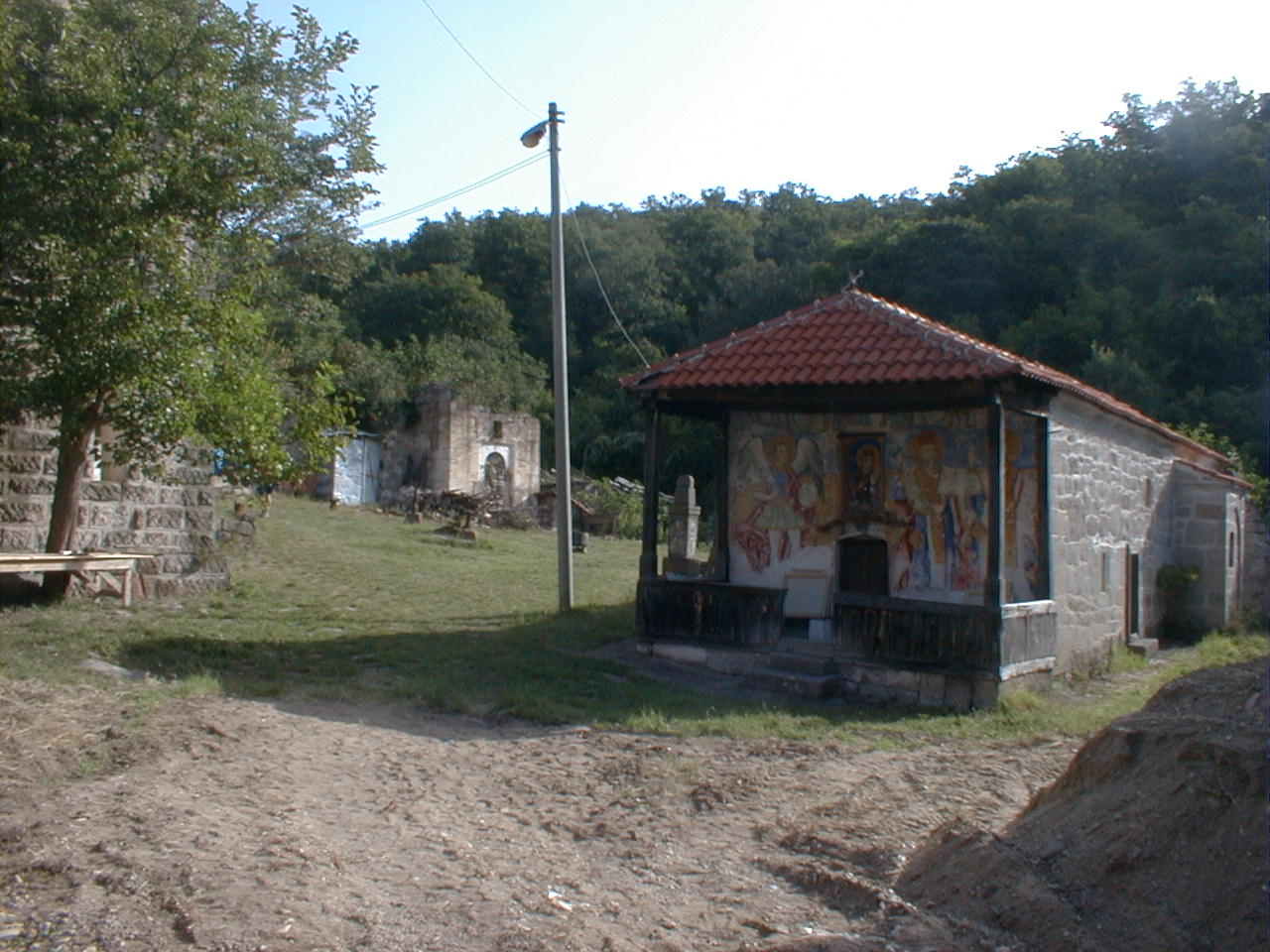
- Church dedicated to Presentation of Virgin Mary in Karpino Monastery

- Location within North Macedonia
- Coordinates: 42°10′15″N 21°57′10″E
- Country: North Macedonia
- Region: Northeastern
- Municipality: Staro Nagoričane
- Highest elevation: 617 m (2,024 ft)
- Lowest elevation: 550 m (1,800 ft)

Population (2002)
  - Total: 113
- Time zone: UTC+1 (CET)
  - Summer (DST): UTC+2 (CEST)
- Car plates: KU

Orah or Suvi Orah (Macedonian: Орах) is a village in North Macedonia administrative located in the Staro Nagoričane municipality near town Kumanovo in the micro-region of Sredorek. It used to be part of the former municipality of Klečevce.

== Location ==
Orah is located on the south slopes of the Mountain Kozjak, some 20 km in distance from the town of Kumanovo 1 km from the magistral road Kumanovo - Kyustendil. Today's few remaining inhabitants are engaged in sheep breeding and farming.

== History ==
The village was first mentioned in 1519 in one Turkish Defter, according to this document the village had 39 households (all Christian). In the next census, which is made in 1573 year, its recorded 79 households (all Christian, and one Muslim). At the end of 19th century Оrah is one Christian settlement of 760 inhabitants in Kumanovo Kaza.

At the time of World War I village Orah became the administrative seat of the homonymous municipality, and had a population of 615 residents.

== Demographics ==
According to the 2002 census, the village had a total of 113 inhabitants. Ethnic groups in the village include:

- Macedonians 113

== Landmarks ==
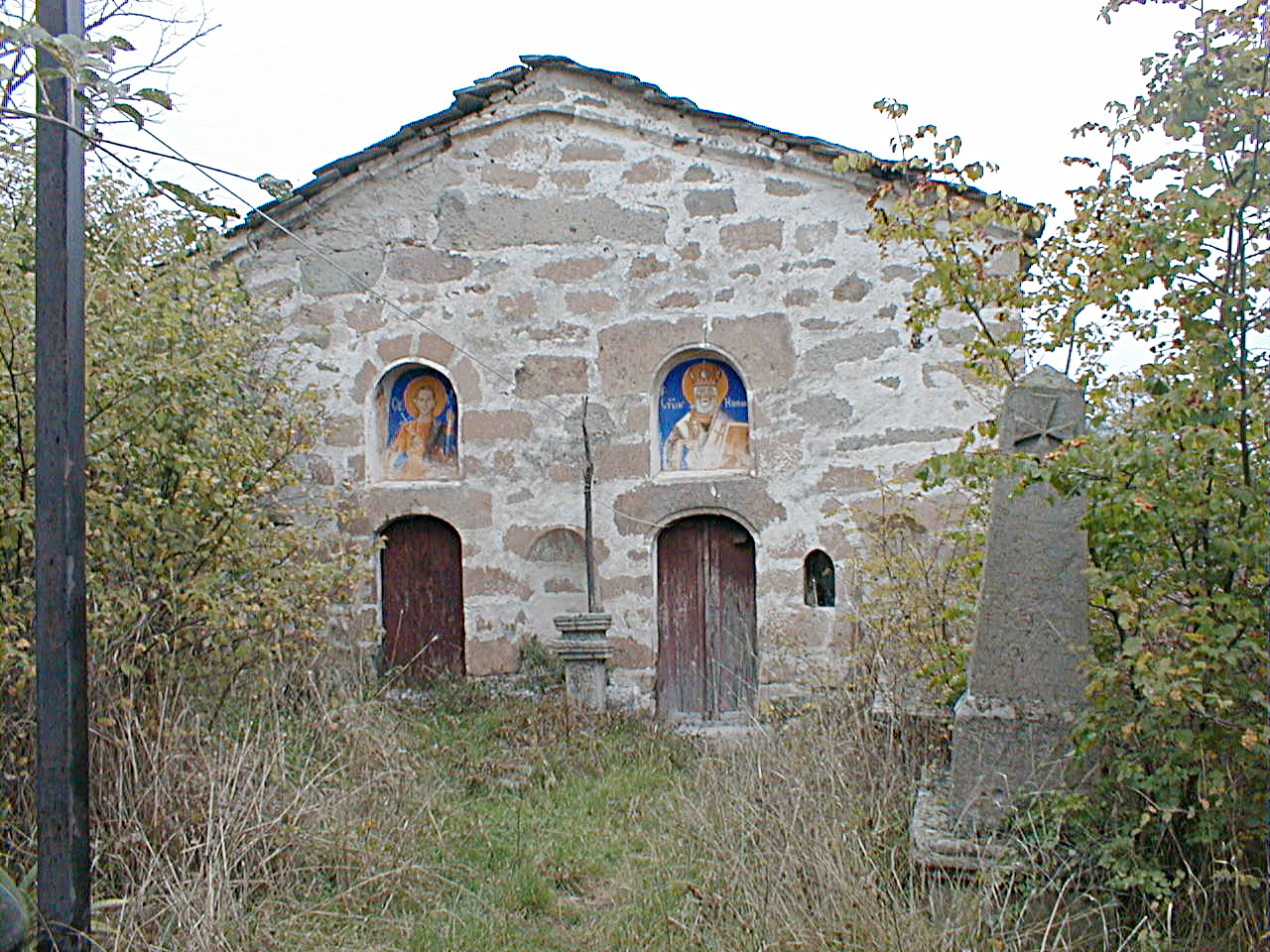
Church of St.George and St. Nikolas

The most important object near the village Orah is Karpino Monastery with his main monastery church dedicated to Presentation of Virgin Mary, built from the 16th - 17th century.

Another important object is a small rural church dedicated to two saints; St. George and St. Nikolas (village patron), which was probably built in the 17th century (but this is even today not exactly clear).

== Events ==
The most important event that takes place in Karpino Monastery each year is the Karpino Art Colony.
