= Arbanaško =

Arbanaško Арбанашко
- Village
- Location within North Macedonia
- Coordinates: 42.263209°N 21.995044°E
- Country: North Macedonia
- Region: Northeastern
- Municipality: Staro Nagoričane

Population (2002)
  - Total: 40
- Time zone: UTC+1 (CET)
  - Summer (DST): UTC+2 (CEST)
- Car plates: KU

Arbanaško (Macedonian: Арбанашко) is a village in the municipality of Staro Nagoričane, North Macedonia.

== Demographics ==
According to the 2002 census, the village had a total of 237 inhabitants. Ethnic groups in the village include:

- Macedonians 38
- Serbs 1
- Others 1
