= Staro Nagoričane Municipality =

Municipality of North Macedonia

Coordinates: 42.20°N 21.83°E

Staro Nagoričane Municipality Општина Старо Нагоричане
- Municipality
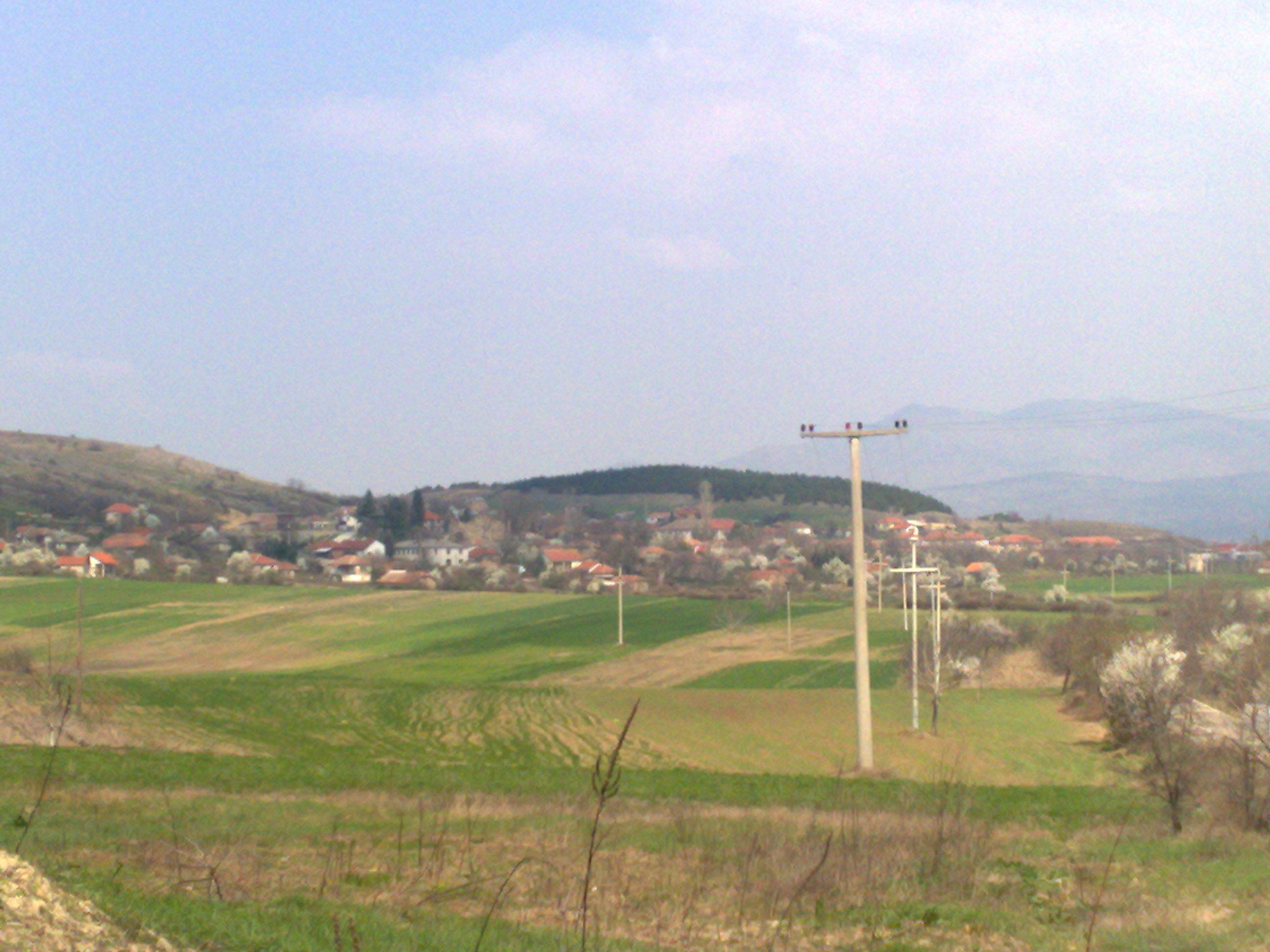

- Flag Coat of arms

- Location within North Macedonia
- Country: North Macedonia
- Region: Northeastern
- Municipal seat: Staro Nagoričane

Government
  - Mayor: Miroslav Slavkovski (VMRO-DPMNE)

Area
  - Total: 433.41 km^{2} (167.34 sq mi)

Population
  - Total: 3,501
- Time zone: UTC+1 (CET)
- Postal code: 1303
- Area code: +389 031
- ISO 3166 code: MK-71
- Vehicle registration: KU

Staro Nagoričane Municipality (Macedonian: Општина Старо Нагоричане) is a municipality in the northern part of North Macedonia. The municipal seat is located in the village of Staro Nagoričane. This municipality is part of the Northeastern Statistical Region.

== Geography ==
The municipality borders Serbia to the north, the Kumanovo Municipality to the west, the Kratovo Municipality to the south, and the Rankovce Municipality to the east. It largely corresponds to the historical and geographical region of Sredorek. Staro Nagoričane includes the Kostoperska Karpa site.

== History and culture ==
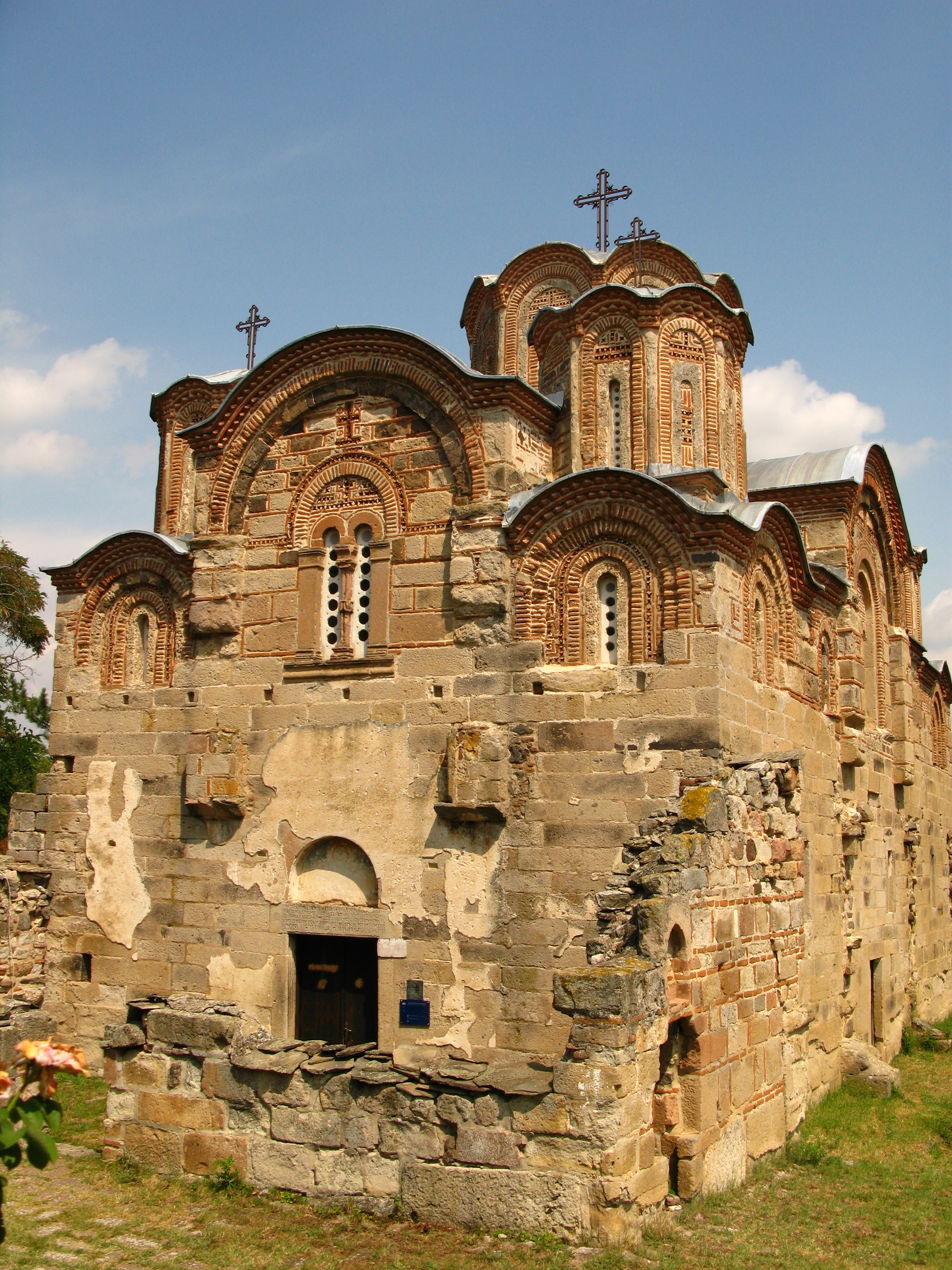
Church of St. George

By the 2003 territorial division of the Republic, the rural Klečevce Municipality was annexed to the Staro Nagoričane Municipality.

A particularly fine example of medieval Serbian ecclesiastical architecture is found in the municipality, in the form of the 10th century Church of St. George. (See: Serbo-Byzantine style)

== Demographics ==
There were 5,867 inhabitants in 1994. According to the 2021 North Macedonia census, this municipality has 3,501 inhabitants. Ethnic groups in the municipality:

	2002		2021	
	Number	%	Number	%
TOTAL	4,840	100	3,501	100
Macedonians	3,906	80.7	2,513	71.78
Serbs	926	19.13	585	16.71
Albanians	1	0.02	13	0.37
Roma	1	0.02	3	0.08
Other / Undeclared / Unknown	6	0.13	9	0.26
Persons for whom data are taken from administrative sources			378	10.8

== Inhabited places ==
Inhabited places in the Staro Nagoričane Municipality
villages: Algunja (Алгуња) | Aljince (Аљинце) | Arbanaško (Арбанашко) | Bajlovce (Бајловце) | Breško (Брешко) | Bukovljane (Буковљане) | Vojnik (Војник) | Vragoturce (Враготурце) | Vračevce (Врачевце) | Dejlovce (Дејловце) | Dlabočica (Длабочица) | Dobrača (Добрача) | Dragomance (Драгоманце) | Drenok (Дренок) | Žegljane (Жегљане) | Željuvino (Жељувино) | Kanarevo (Канарево) | Karlovce (Карловце) | Koince (Коинце) | Kokino (Кокино) | M'glence (М'гленце) | Makreš (Макреш) | Malotino (Малотино) | Mlado Nagoričane (Младо Нагоричане) | Nikuljane (Никуљане) | Oblavce (Облавце) | Orah (Орах) | Osiče (Осиче), Pelince (Пелинце) | Puzajka (Пузајка) | Ramno (Рамно) | Ruǵince (Руѓинце) | Staro Nagoričane (Старо Нагоричане) | Stepance (Степанце) | Strezovce (Стрезовце), Strnovac (Стрновац) | Cvetišnica (Цветишница) | Cvilance (Цвиланце) | Čelopek (Челопек)

== Notable people ==
- Denko Krstić (1824–1882), influential merchant, born in Mlado Nagoričane.
- Petko Ilić (1886–1912), guerilla fighter, born in Staro Nagoričane.
- Todor Krstić-Algunjski (d. after 1918), guerilla fighter, born in Algunja.
- Ditko Aleksić (d. 1916), guerilla fighter, born in Osiče.
- Timotej of Debar and Kichevo (b. 1951), Orthodox Metropolitan, born in Mlado Nagoričane.

== International relations ==
Staro Nagoričane is twinned with:

- , Gornji Milanovac, Serbia.
