= Stanko Mladenovski =

Speaker of the People's Assembly of the Socialist Republic of Macedonia

Speakers of the People's Assembly
- In office 25 April 1985 – 28 April 1986
- Preceded by: Kata Lahtova
- Succeeded by: Vulnet Starova

Personal details
- Born: November 9, 1937 (age 88) Vračevce, Kumanovo; SFRY (today: North Macedonia)
- Citizenship: Yugoslavia; North Macedonia
- Party: League of Communists of Macedonia
- Education: Skopje University
- Occupation: Engineer, Politician

Military service
- Allegiance: Yugoslavia
- Branch/service: Yugoslav People's Army

Stanko Mladenovski (born 9 November 1937) is a former Speaker of the People's Assembly of Socialist Republic of Macedonia.

Political offices
Preceded by Kata Lahtova	Speaker of the People's Assembly of the Socialist Republic of Macedonia; 1985–1986	Succeeded by Vulnet Starova
