= Hafuz Pasha =

His Excellency Hafuz Pasha

vali (governor) of Üsküb (Skopje)

Personal details
- Born: February 9, 1826 Macedonia, Ottoman Empire (modern North Macedonia)
- Died: May 14, 1904 (age 78) Istanbul, Ottoman Empire (modern Turkey)

Military service
- Allegiance: Ottoman Empire
- Rank: brigadier-general
- Battles/wars: April Uprising of 1876 Kumanovo uprising

Hafız or Hafuz Pasha (Albanian: Hafuz Pasha, Macedonian: Хафуз-паша/Hafuz-paša or Hafus-paša; fl. 1826 - 1904) was an Albanian Ottoman official and vali (governor) of Üsküb (Skopje). In the 1870s, he had the rank of brigadier-general. Under his command, Ottoman troops and bashibazouks suppressed the April Uprising in 1876, and the Kumanovo Uprising in 1878.

== Military career ==
He led a brigade that suppressed the April Uprising. Under his command, 212 of 223 houses in Rakovitsa were burnt down, with 36 inhabitants killed; 26 of 125 houses in Popintsa were burnt down, with 66 inhabitants killed; 60 of 100 houses in Bania were burnt down, with 13 inhabitants killed; 80 of 120 houses, a church and the school in Metchka were burnt down.

On May 20, 1878, he led the brigade that suppressed the four-month-long Kumanovo Uprising.

== See also ==
- Yusuf Aga of Sofya
- Ahmed Aga Barutanli
- Hasan Pasha of Niş
- Reshid Pasha
