= Dejlovce =

- Village
- Location within North Macedonia
- Coordinates: 42°15′0″N 22°0′0″E
- Country: North Macedonia
- Region: Northeastern
- Municipality: Staro Nagoričane
- Elevation: 650 m (2,130 ft)

Population (2002)
  - Total: 44
- Time zone: UTC+1 (CET)
  - Summer (DST): UTC+2 (CEST)
- Car plates: KU

Dejlovce (Macedonian: Дејловце) is a settlement in northeastern North Macedonia, in the municipality of Staro Nagoričane. According to the 2002 census, it had 44 inhabitants.

== Geography ==
To the nearest city, the settlement is 25 kilometres east of Kumanovo. Dejlovce is situated in the historical region of Sredorek, on the western slopes of the German mountains, on ca. 650 m above sea.

== History ==
In Serbian Emperor Stefan Dušan's (r. 1331–55) confirmed on 10 August 1354, several villages, settlements and arable land which was granted (metochion) by despot Dejan to his endowment, the Arhiljevica Church of the Holy Mother of God. Dejkovo or Deikovo was one of the mentioned selište (arable land). In the 1379 charter of Dejan's son Konstantin, it was known as the village of Deikovci. The Kumanovo region (old Žegligovo) received its geographical location and certain settlement picture in the 14th century, during the rule of the Nemanjić and Dejanović.

== Demographics ==
According to the 2002 census, it had 44 inhabitants, all of whom declared as ethnic Macedonians. The families are Eastern Orthodox Christian. In the 1994 census, it had 66 inhabitants.
