= Orah, Ravno =

Orah
- Village
- Location within Bosnia and Herzegovina
- Coordinates: 42.70167141°N 18.1718598°E
- Country: Bosnia and Herzegovina
- Entity: Federation of Bosnia and Herzegovina
- Canton: Herzegovina-Neretva
- Municipality: Ravno

Area
  - Total: 2.36 sq mi (6.12 km^{2})

Population (2013)
  - Total: 34
  - Density: 14/sq mi (5.6/km^{2})
- Time zone: UTC+1 (CET)
  - Summer (DST): UTC+2 (CEST)

Orah is a village in the municipality of Ravno, Bosnia and Herzegovina.

== Demographics ==
According to the 2013 census, its population was 34, all Serbs.
