= Oblavce =

Oblavce Облавце
- Village
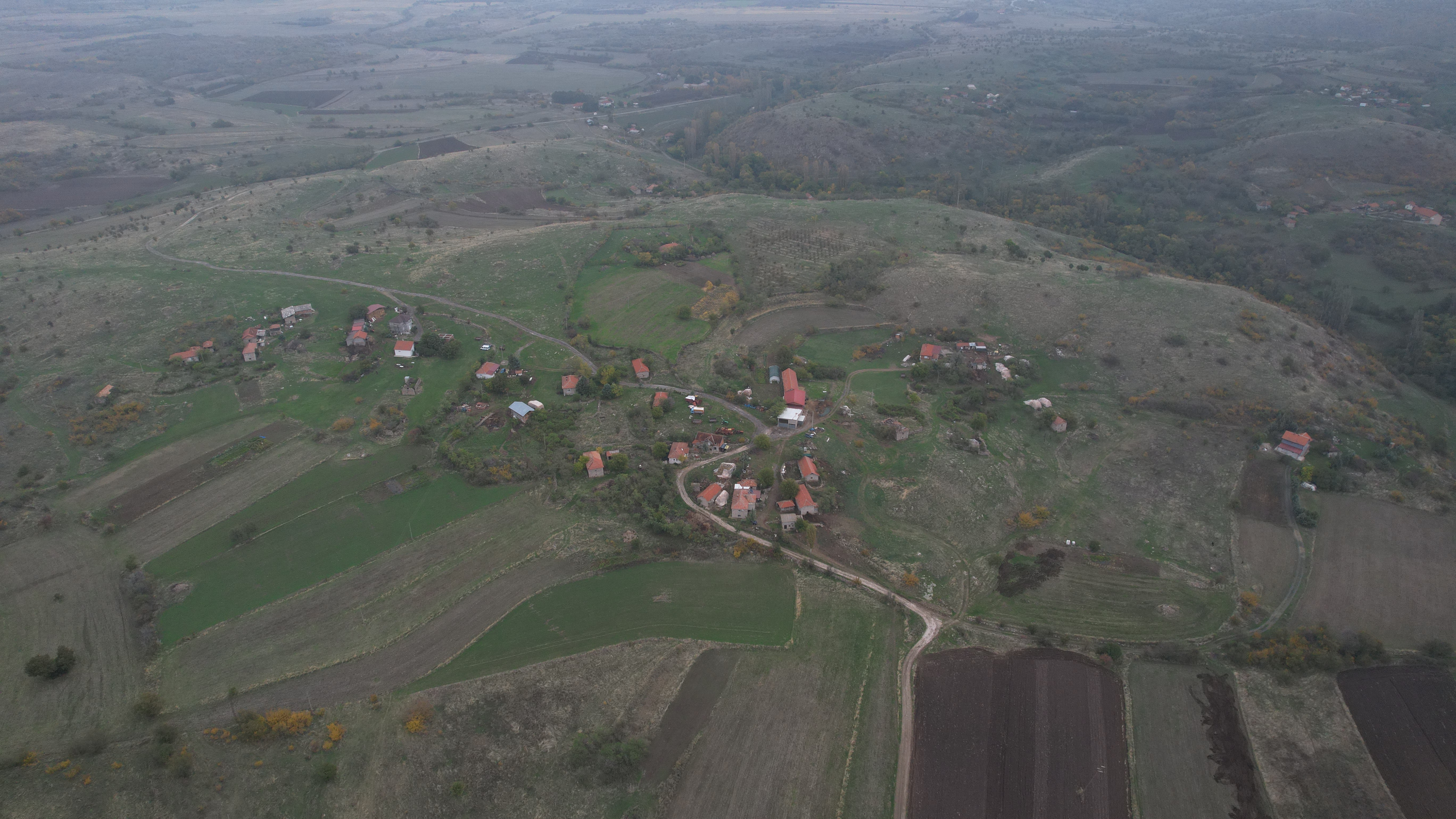
- Air view of the village

- Location within North Macedonia
- Coordinates: 42.159803°N 21.913081°E
- Country: North Macedonia
- Region: Northeastern
- Municipality: Staro Nagoričane

Population (2002)
  - Total: 124
- Time zone: UTC+1 (CET)
  - Summer (DST): UTC+2 (CEST)
- Car plates: KU

Oblavce (Macedonian: Облавце) is a village in the municipality of Staro Nagoričane, North Macedonia. It used to be part of the former municipality of Klečevce.

== Demographics ==
According to the 2002 census, the village had a total of 124 inhabitants. Ethnic groups in the village include:

- Macedonians 123
- Serbs 1
