= Malotino =

Malotino Малотино
- Village
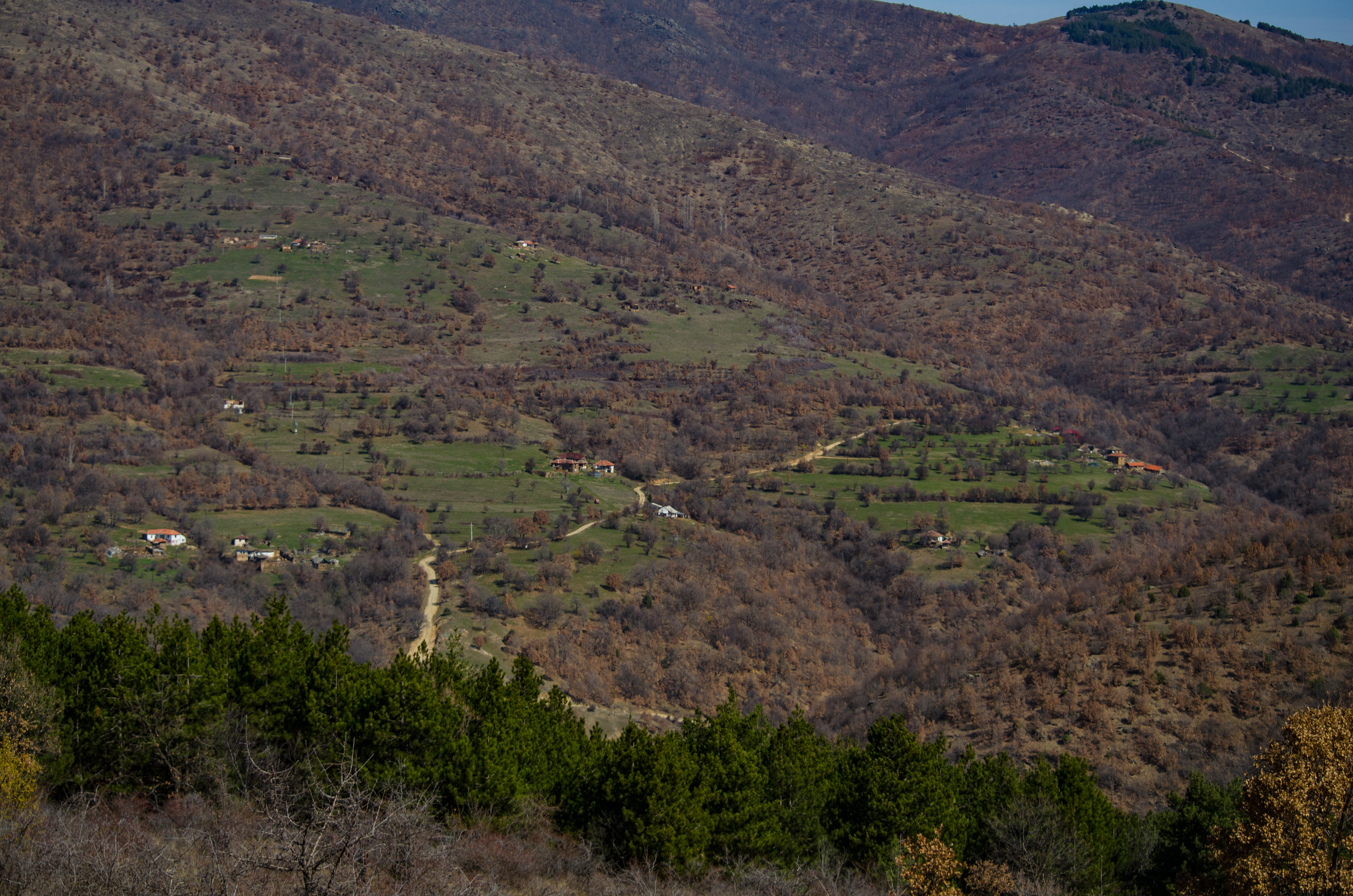
- Panoramic view of the village Malotino

- Location within North Macedonia
- Country: North Macedonia
- Region: Northeastern
- Municipality: Staro Nagoričane

Population (2002)
  - Total: 37
- Time zone: UTC+1 (CET)
  - Summer (DST): UTC+2 (CEST)
- Car plates: KU

Malotino (Macedonian: Малотино) is a small village in the municipality of Staro Nagoričane, North Macedonia, at the border with Serbia.

== Name ==
The name stems from the Albanian word for mountains malet (as a plural tantum) and the Slavic suffix /ino.

== Geography ==
The settlement is located in the area of Kozjacija, in the extreme northeastern part of the territory of the Municipality of Staro Nagoricane, whose area touches the state border with Serbia. The village is scattered and has a mountainous character, whose neighborhoods rise to an altitude of 600 to 840 meters. The village is 36 km away from the city of Kumanovo. The area covers space of 10.4 km^{2}. It is dominated by 528 hectares of pastures, 260 hectares of arable land and 192 hectares of forests.

== Demographics ==
According to the statistics of the Bulgarian ethnographer Vasil Kanchov from 1900, 440 inhabitants lived in the village of Malotino, all Bulgarian Christians. According to the Secretary of the Bulgarian Exarchate Dimitar Mišev ("La Macédoine et sa Population Chrétienne"), in 1905 Malotino had 544 Bulgarians.

In 1961 Malotino had 317 inhabitants, of which 313 were Macedonians, 3 Serbs and 1 Albanian, and in 1994 the village moved to a small settlement with 64 inhabitants, of which 58 were Macedonians and 6 Serbs.

According to the 2002 census, the village had a total of 37 inhabitants. Ethnic groups in the village include:

- Macedonians 33
- Serbs 4
