= Oreh, Bulgaria =

Oreh Орех
- Village
- Location within Bulgaria
- Coordinates: 41°26′51″N 25°36′35″E
- Country: Bulgaria
- Province: Kardzhali Province
- Municipality: Krumovgrad
- Time zone: UTC+2 (EET)
  - Summer (DST): UTC+3 (EEST)

Oreh is a village in Krumovgrad Municipality, Kardzhali Province, southern Bulgaria.
