= Žegljane =

Žegljane Жегљане
- Village
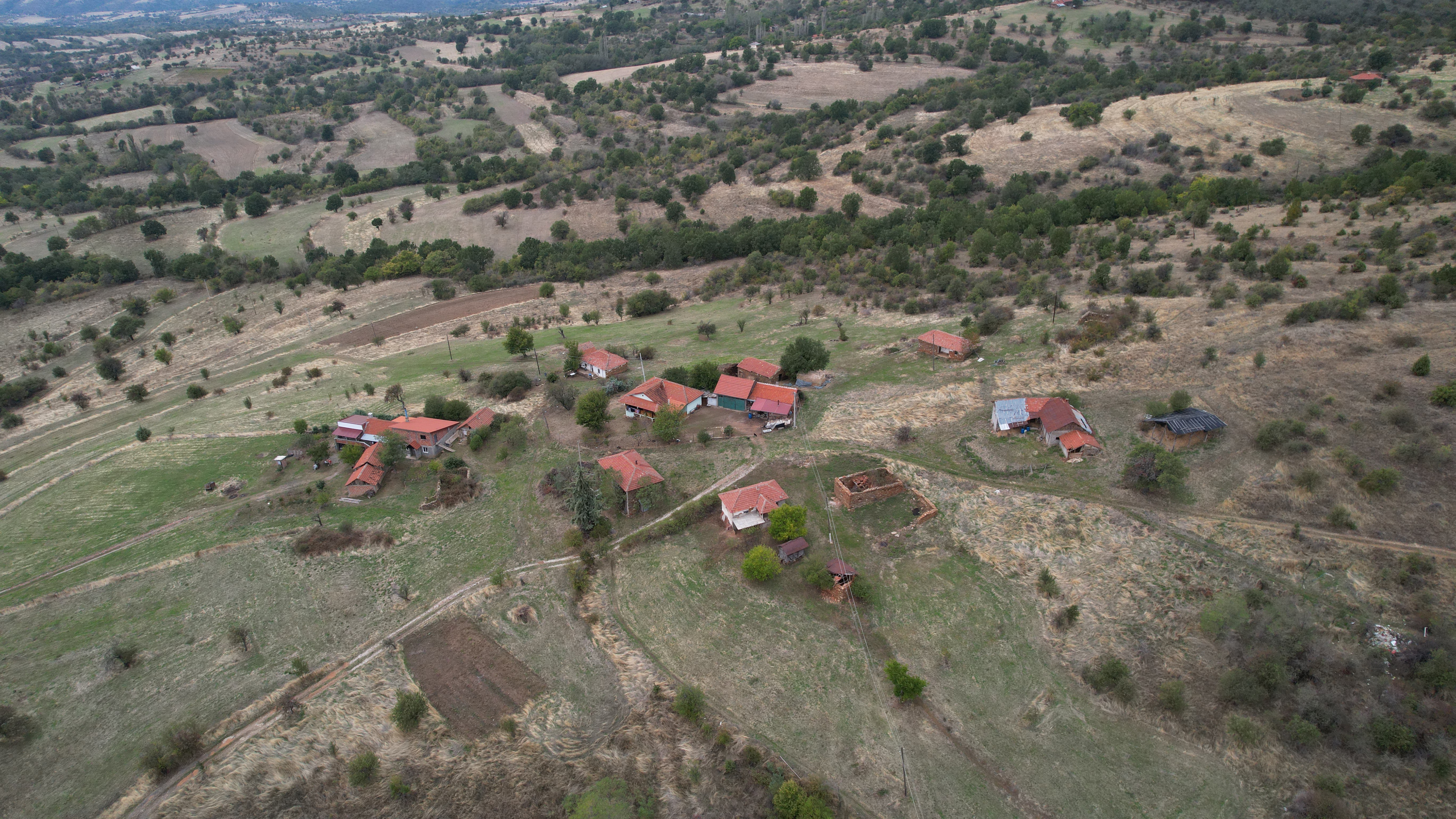
- Air view of the village

- Location within North Macedonia
- Country: North Macedonia
- Region: Northeastern
- Municipality: Staro Nagoričane

Population (2002)
  - Total: 86
- Time zone: UTC+1 (CET)
  - Summer (DST): UTC+2 (CEST)
- Car plates: KU

Žegljane (Macedonian: Жегљане) is a village in the municipality of Staro Nagoričane, North Macedonia.

== Demographics ==
According to the 2002 census, the village had a total of 129 inhabitants. Ethnic groups in the village include:

- Macedonians 86
