= Suševo =

Suševo Сушево
- Location within North Macedonia
- Coordinates: 41.525376°N 22.627763°E
- Country: North Macedonia
- Region: Southeastern
- Municipality: Vasilevo

Population
  - Total: 508
- Time zone: UTC+1 (CET)
  - Summer (DST): UTC+2 (CEST)

Suševo (Macedonian: Сушево) is a village in the municipality of Vasilevo, North Macedonia.

== Demographics ==
According to the 2002 census, the village had a total of 723 inhabitants. Ethnic groups in the village include:

- Macedonians 707
- Turks 15
- Others 1

As of 2021, the village of Sushevo has 508 inhabitants and the ethnic composition was the following:

- Macedonians – 441
- Person for whom data are taken from administrative sources - 57
- Turks – 8
- Albanians – 2
