= Algunja =

Algunja Алгуња
- Village
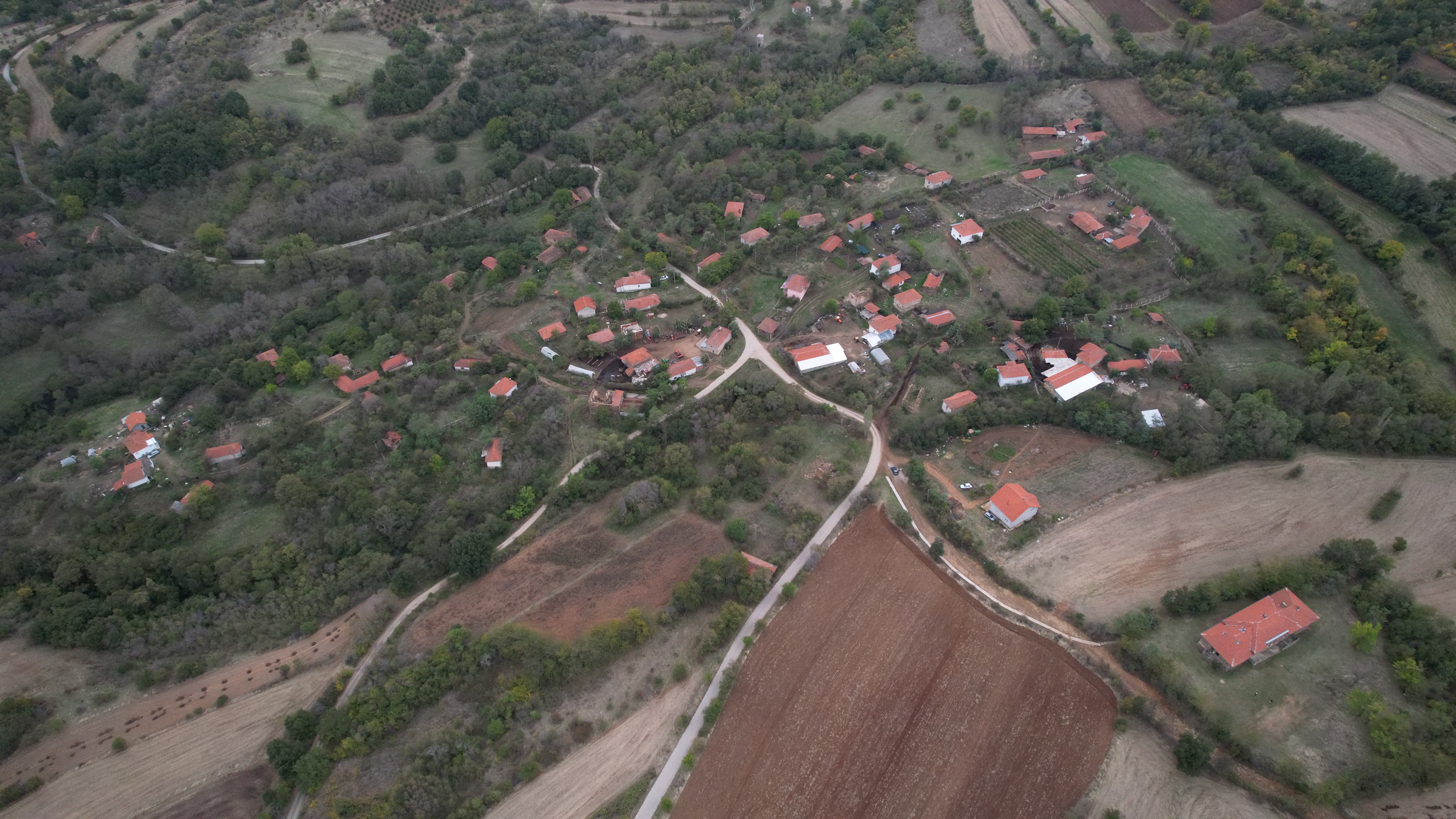
- Air view of the village

- Location within North Macedonia
- Coordinates: 42.260640°N 21.818153°E
- Country: North Macedonia
- Region: Northeastern
- Municipality: Staro Nagoričane

Population (2021)
  - Total: 300
- Time zone: UTC+1 (CET)
  - Summer (DST): UTC+2 (CEST)
- Car plates: KU

Algunja (Macedonian: Алгуња) is a village in the municipality of Staro Nagoričane, North Macedonia.

== Demographics ==
As of the 2021 census, Algunja had 300 residents with the following ethnic composition:

- Serbs 136
- Macedonians 85
- Persons for whom data are taken from administrative sources 69
- Others 10

According to the 2002 census, the village had a total of 237 inhabitants. Ethnic groups in the village include:

- Serbs 149
- Macedonians 88
