= Staro Nagoričane =

Staro Nagoričane Старо Нагоричане
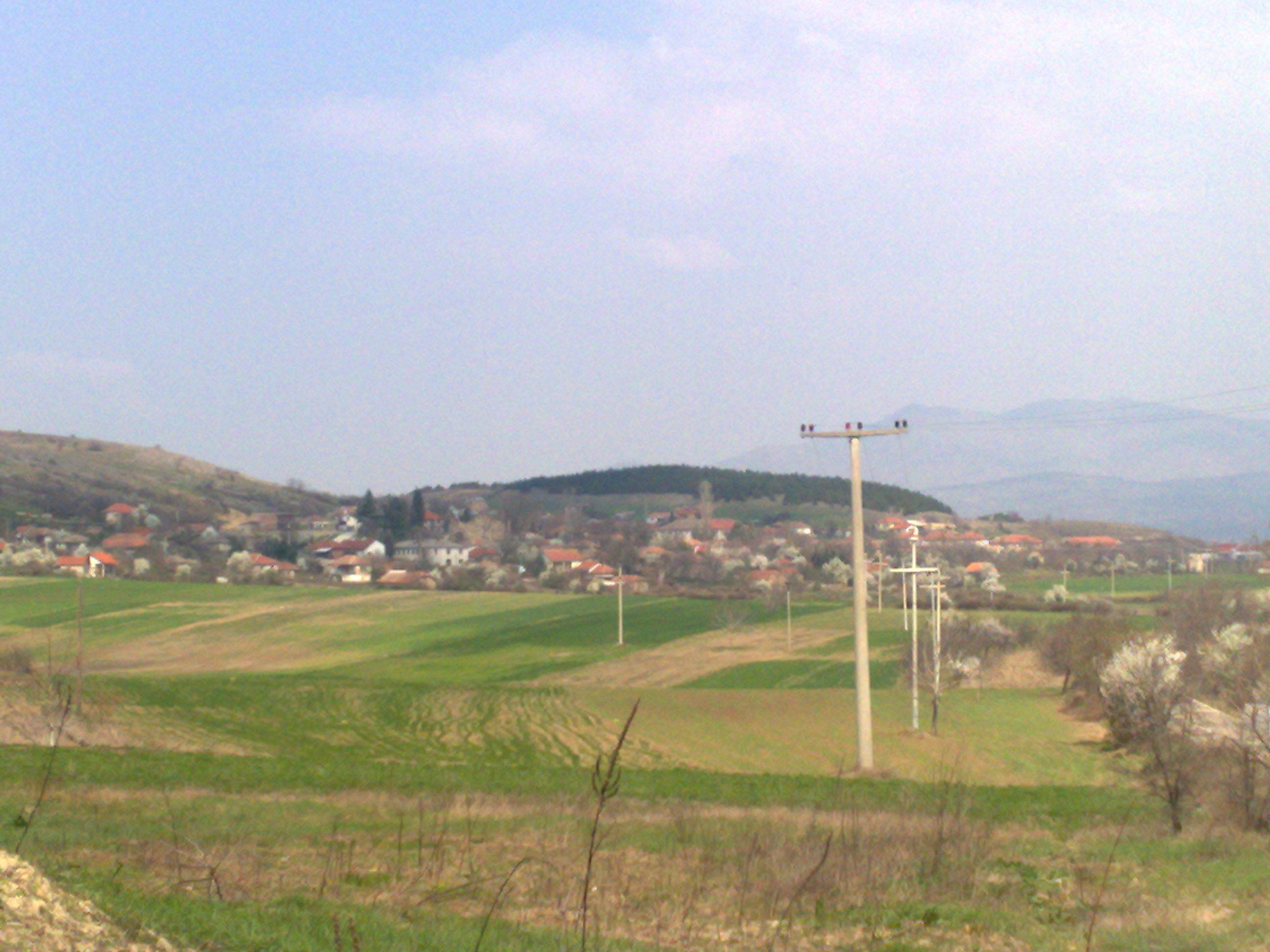

- Flag Coat of arms

- Location within North Macedonia
- Country: North Macedonia
- Region: Northeastern
- Municipality: Staro Nagoričane

Population (2021)
  - Total: 493
- Time zone: UTC+1 (CET)
  - Summer (DST): UTC+2 (CEST)
- Postal code: 1303
- Area code: +389 031
- Car plates: KU

Staro Nagoričane (Macedonian: Старо Нагоричане) is a village in North Macedonia and the seat of the Staro Nagoričane municipality. The village is primarily known for its 11th century Church of St. George, first constructed in 1071 during Byzantine Macedonia, and reconstructed between 1313 and 1318 by Serbian King Stefan Milutin.

== Geography ==
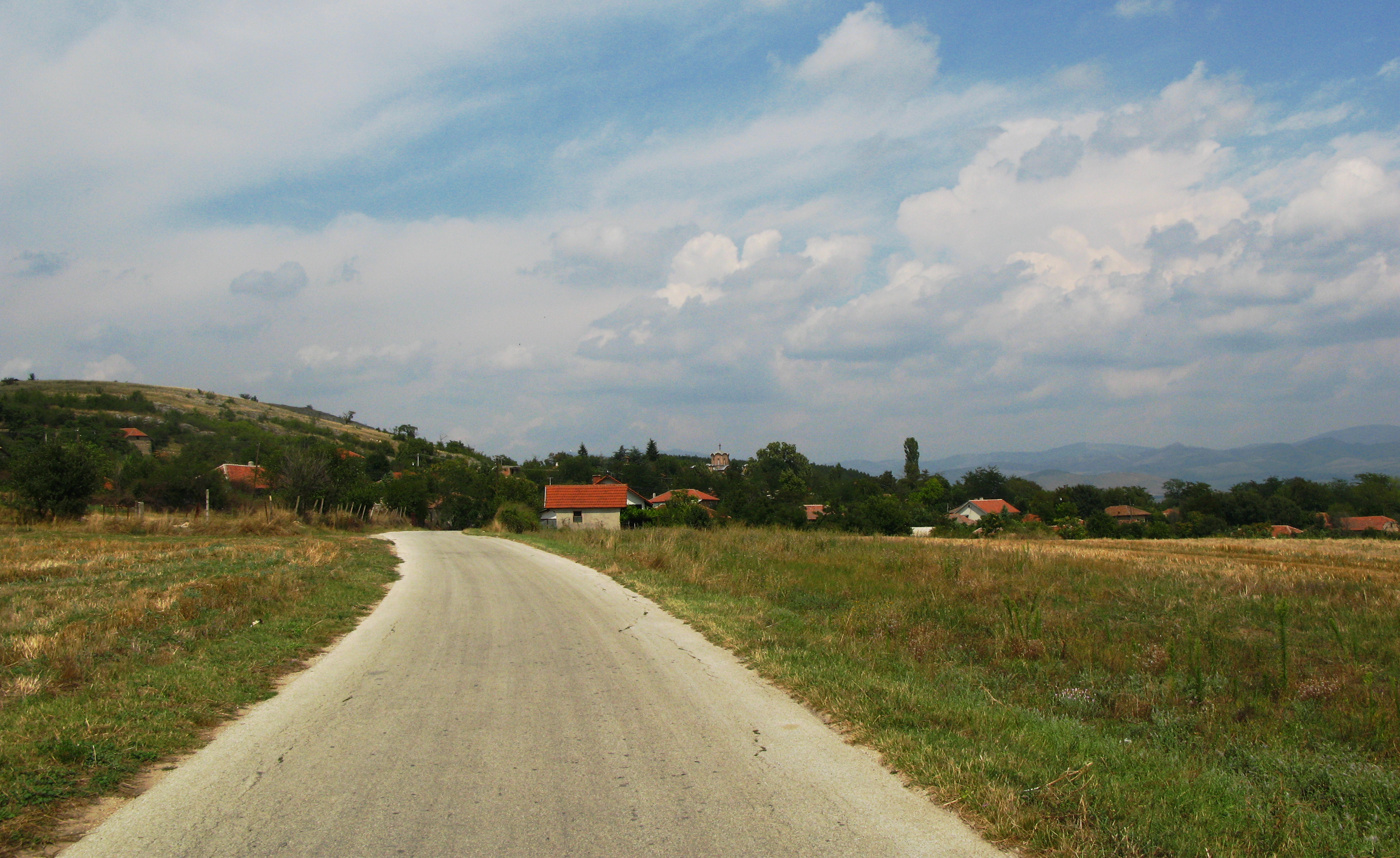
Staro Nagoričane with cupola of Church of St. George seen in background.

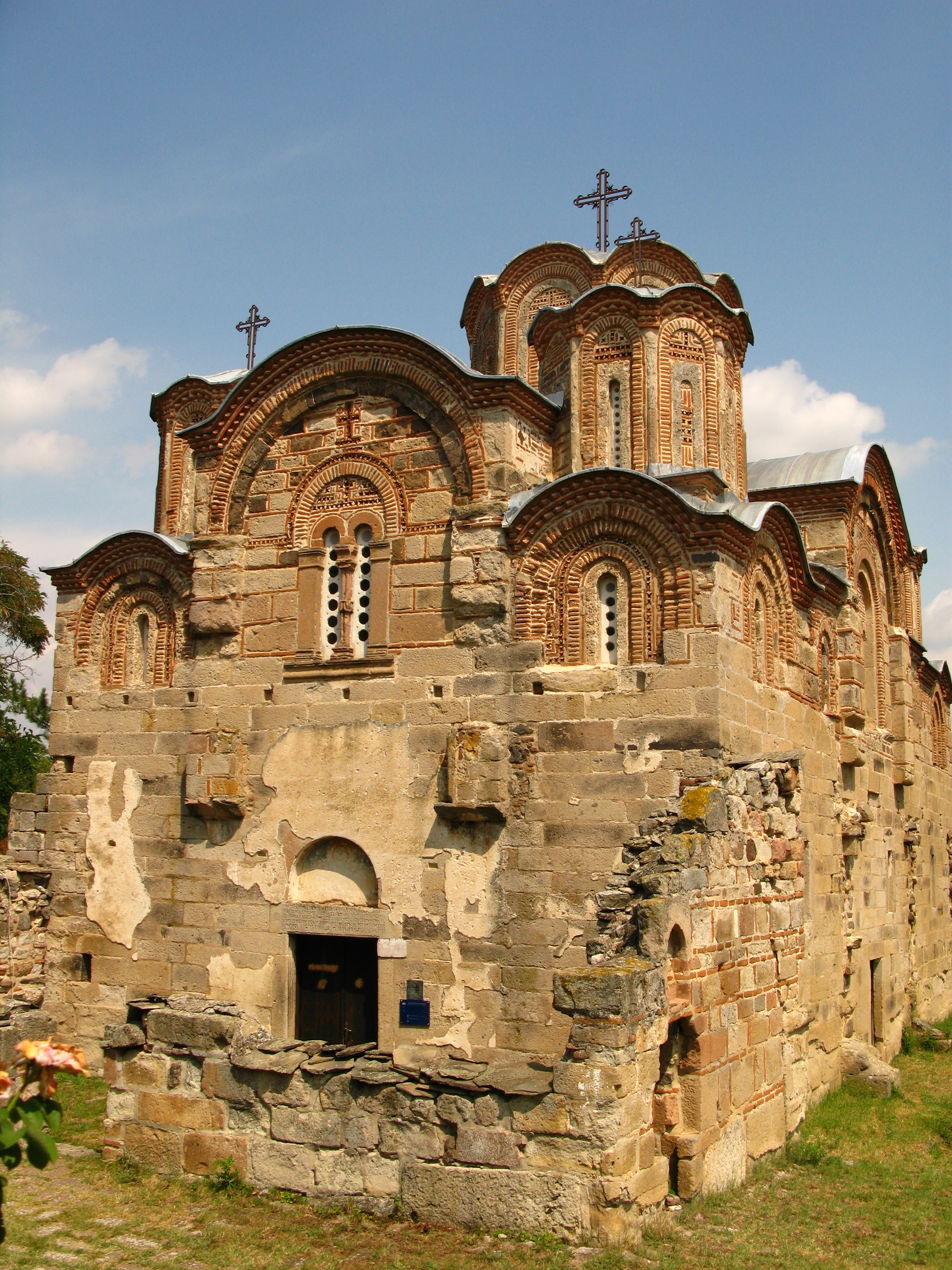
Church of St. George

The village is located in the Sredorek region.

== Culture ==
- Church of St. George

== Demographics ==
As of the 2021 census, Staro Nagoričane had 493 residents with the following ethnic composition:

- Serbs 302 (61.3%)
- Macedonians 169 (34.3%)
- Persons for whom data are taken from administrative sources 18 (3.7%)
- Others 4

According to the 2002 census, the village had 555 inhabitants, out of which 452 (~80%) were Serbs, 100 (~20%) were Macedonians, 1 was Romani, and 2 Others.

== Annotations ==
- Name: The official name is Staro Nagoričane, while it has been historically spelled Staro Nagoričano (Старо Нагоричано) and Staro Nagoričino (Старо Нагоричино)
