= Petko Ilić =

Serbian Chetnik commander

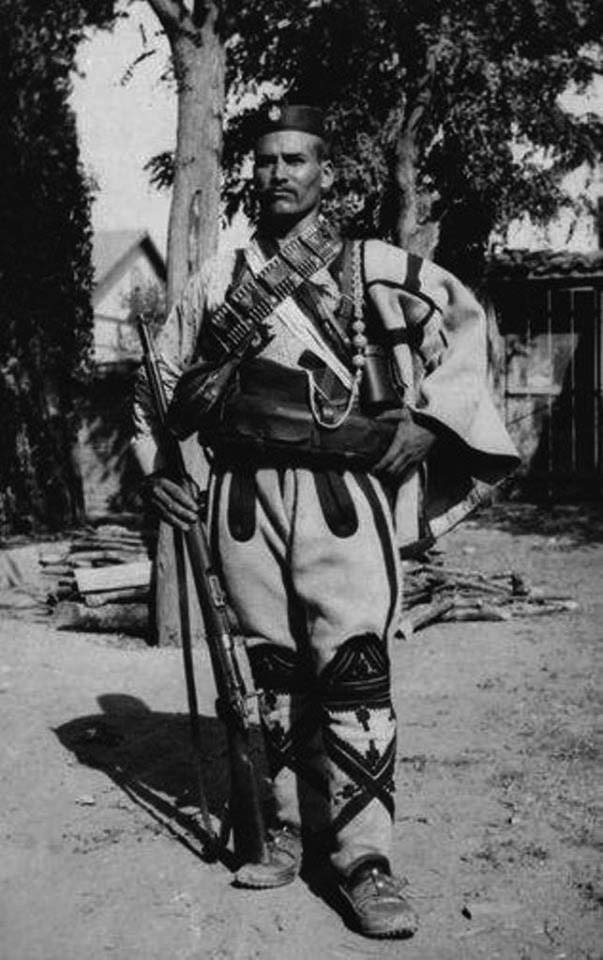
- Petko Ilić in Bitola, during the Young Turk Revolution (1908)
- Born: July, 1885; Staro Nagoričane, Ottoman Empire (now North Macedonia)
- Died: March 17, 1912 (aged 25–26)
- Military career
- Allegiance: Serbian Chetnik Organization (1903–1908)
- Service years: 1903–08
- Rank: Voivode (Vojvoda)
- Nicknames: Musa, Moma Vojvoda, Vojvoda Nagorički

Petko Ilić (Serbian Cyrillic: Петко Илић; July 1886 – March 17, 1912) was a Serbian Chetnik commander active in Macedonia.

== Life ==
Ilić was born in Staro Nagoričane. He became a vojvoda in 1906.

Petko Ilić was born in July 1886, in Staro Nagoričane, a Serbian village that is primarily known for its Church of St. George built in 1071 and reconstructed between 1313 and 1318 by Serbian king Stefan Milutin. At the time of Petko Ilić's birth that Christian territory was still under the long occupation of the Ottoman Empire. His inheritance, from generations of Serbian ancestors, was hate of Turkish tyranny and the example of many forefathers who fought against it futilely. When he was six-years-old he saw his family members dragged from home in chains by Turkish soldiers and Bashi-bazouks, lashed and imprisoned, on a charge of treason. As a youngster of 16 in 1903, he joined what he thought was a Serbian četa (band of freedom fighters), led by Valko Mandarčev, a Bulgarian pretending to be a Serb sympathizer. In the winter of 1904 Mandarčev's cheta met the komitadji of Bobi Stojcev, an IMRO commander, near Poreč, they were disarmed and liquidated. Petko Ilić, 17 at the time, was somehow spared and sent to Bulgaria's capital Sofia to be indoctrinated.

From Bulgaria Ilić managed to escape and make his way to Vranje in the spring of 1905. There he joined the četa of Anđel Đorđević. Even that četa was ambushed when they crossed the frontier and were suddenly surrounded by Turkish troops. After fierce fighting, most of the četa members were killed with only Petko Ilić and two others left. They bravely confronted the attacking Turks by launching at them with bayonets fixed to the muzzle of their rifles in hand-to-hand combat. When it became evident that the Turks were about to overpower them, Petko decided to explode a bomb. The explosion took the lives of more than a dozen. However, Petko, who was thrown several feet away, was unconscious but not mortally wounded. The remaining Turks did not bother to bury any of the corpses, and left for their garrison. After Ilic came around, he managed to muster enough strength to find his way back to Serbian territory, though wounded.

He went on to fight many battles with the Turks and Bulgars under the command of Jovan Dovezenski, had lost several trusted lieutenants, had several more narrow escapes, including having to fight his way with his cheta through a cordon of the enemy. Petko Ilić became a commander (Vojvoda) in 1906 in Skopska Crna Gora, where he organized a communication network between two headquarters.

The Bulgarian-sponsored komitadji began terrorizing the nearby Serbian villages and along with Jovan Babunski and a number of other skilled vojvodas fought in this region: Gligor Sokolović, Trenko Rujanović, Jovan Dolgač, Vasilije Trbić, and Cene Marković. Petko and his četa cleared the right bank of the Vardar River, from Skoplje to Veles, and beyond, of Bulgarian komitadji. Subsequently, he headed numerous daring raids into Ottoman territory, fighting the Turks as well.

In July 1908, the Young Turks, along with the Turkish Third Army in Macedonia, marched on Istanbul and overthrew the Turkish sultan, Abdul Hamid. He was replaced by his weak brother, Mohammed V.

A new constitution was proclaimed. All citizens of Turkey, including the sizable Christian population in the Balkans, were promised full political and religious rights. The old feudal system was abolished. A new era was proclaimed.

Excitement was building in Old Serbia and Macedonia about the changes that were about to take place. The Young Turks called for an end to the civil war. Many of the Serbian cetas, the Bulgarian komitadji, and the Greek ardante came out of their respective mountain hidings hoping to return to a peaceful life. The Serbian Committee for Chetnik Action came to an understanding with the new government and gave up their arms in Skopije.

Petko Ilić was falsely presented to the Turks as a leader of the Chetniks. Members of the Turkish high command were surprised to find a young man of slight built and short height with such a popular following. In 1910 Ilić began to fight the Young Turks after they neglected to observe the promises that they had made to the European Powers to respect the Christian population in their Empire.

In 1912, a Bulgarian gunman, a member of the Internal Macedonian Revolutionary Organization (IMRO), shot and killed Ilić in the village of Stracin. Ilić was buried in the monastery complex of the Church of St. Panteleimon (Gorno Nerezi), near the Serbian village of Lepučin in the region of northern Macedonia.

== See also ==
- List of Chetnik voivodes

== Note ==
In 1912, Jovan Dovezenski wrote about him the following:

Since the beginning of the Chetnik organization, Petko was the first to be organized. He was only 16 years old, but that did not stop him from always being one of those who leaped and took weapons and ammunition. Still small and under-developed, he wanted to carry as much as the others. I gave him a rifle and a hundred bullets. He thought it was not enough. I did not give in. After, on the road, he would take two hundred bullets from the others for his martinka (rifle).

— Jovan Dovezenski,

== Sources ==
- Илић, Душан. "ДОПРИНОС ВОЈВОДЕ ПЕТКА ИЛИЋА НАГОРИЧКОГ У ОСЛОБОЂЕЊУ ЈУЖНЕ СРБИЈЕ." Лесковачки зборник 63 (2023): 111-124.
- Шешум, Урош. "Српска четничка акција у источном Повардарју 1911-1912." Преподобни Прохор Пчињски: 950 година у српском народу (2021): 173-192.
