= Kozjak (mountain near Pčinja) =

Mountain in North Macedonia and Serbia

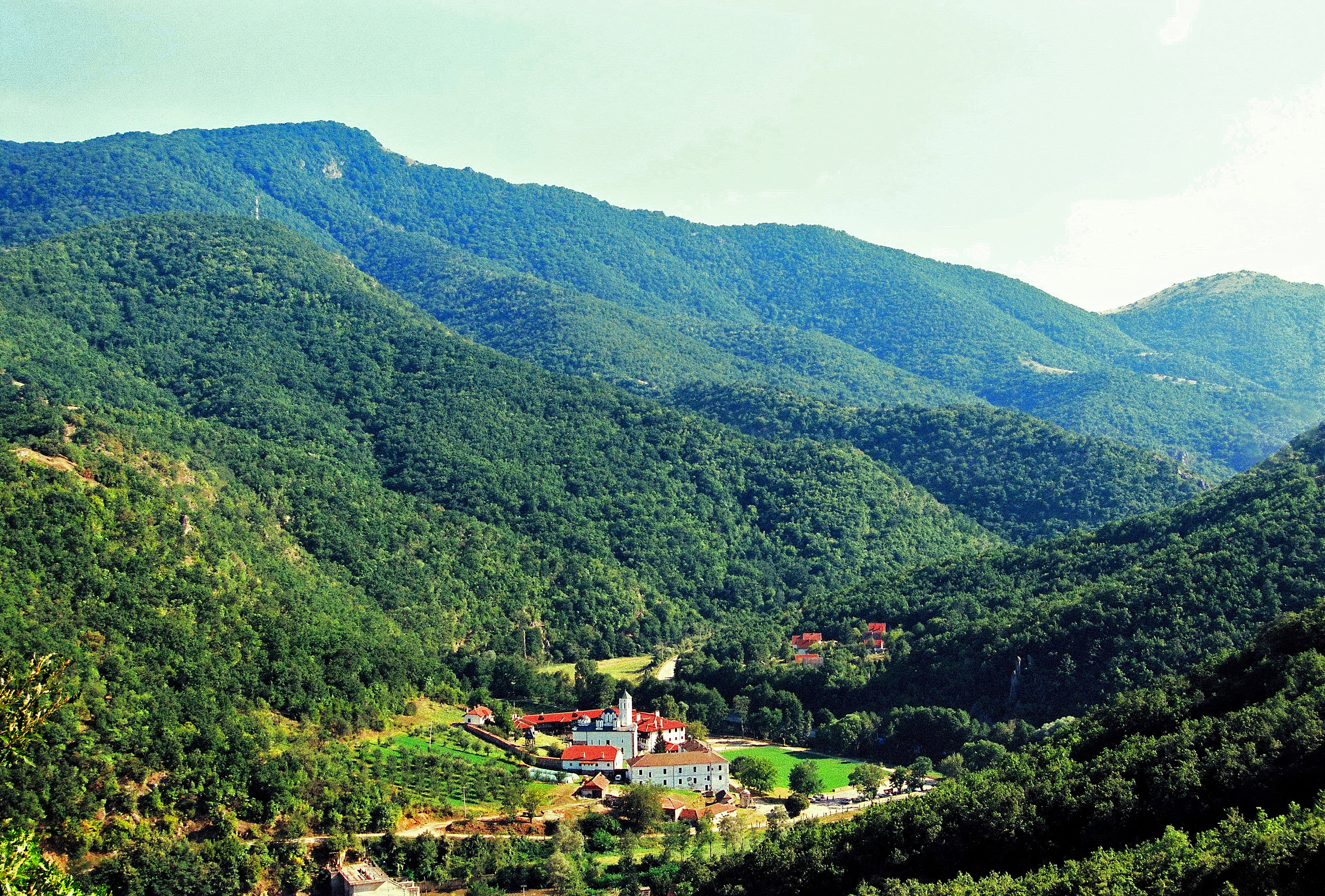
- Prohor Pčinjski at the slopes of the mountain

Highest point
- Elevation: 1,284 m (4,213 ft)
- Coordinates: 42°18′37″N 21°55′42″E

Geography
- Location within Serbia Location within North Macedonia
- Location: North Macedonia and Serbia
- Parent range: Rhodope Mountains

Kozjak (Macedonian: Козјак) is a mountain situated on the border between North Macedonia and Serbia, situated to the northeast of the town Kumanovo. The tallest peak of Kozjak is Virovi at 1284 meters. The region is also known as Kozjačija (Козјачија). The river Pčinja flows along the western edge of the mountain.

During the Macedonian Struggle, the Balkan Wars and World War I, Serbian volunteer detachments fought to liberate the region from Ottoman, Albanian and Bulgarian tyranny. In World War II Kozjak was occupied by Draža Mihajlović's Chetniks and was a ground of severe battles between them and the Macedonian National Liberation Army at the time supported by the Nazi Germany and its Axis collaborators, Bulgaria and the Independent State of Croatia.

Kozjak is famous for the Prohor Pčinjski monastery in which the first session of the Anti-fascist Assembly for the National Liberation of Macedonia was held on 2 August 1944.

== See also ==
- List of mountains in Serbia
