= House of Slavko Brezoski =

Building in North Macedonia

House of Slavko Brezovski
- Куќа на Славко Брезовски; Kukja na Slavko Brezovski (Macedonian)
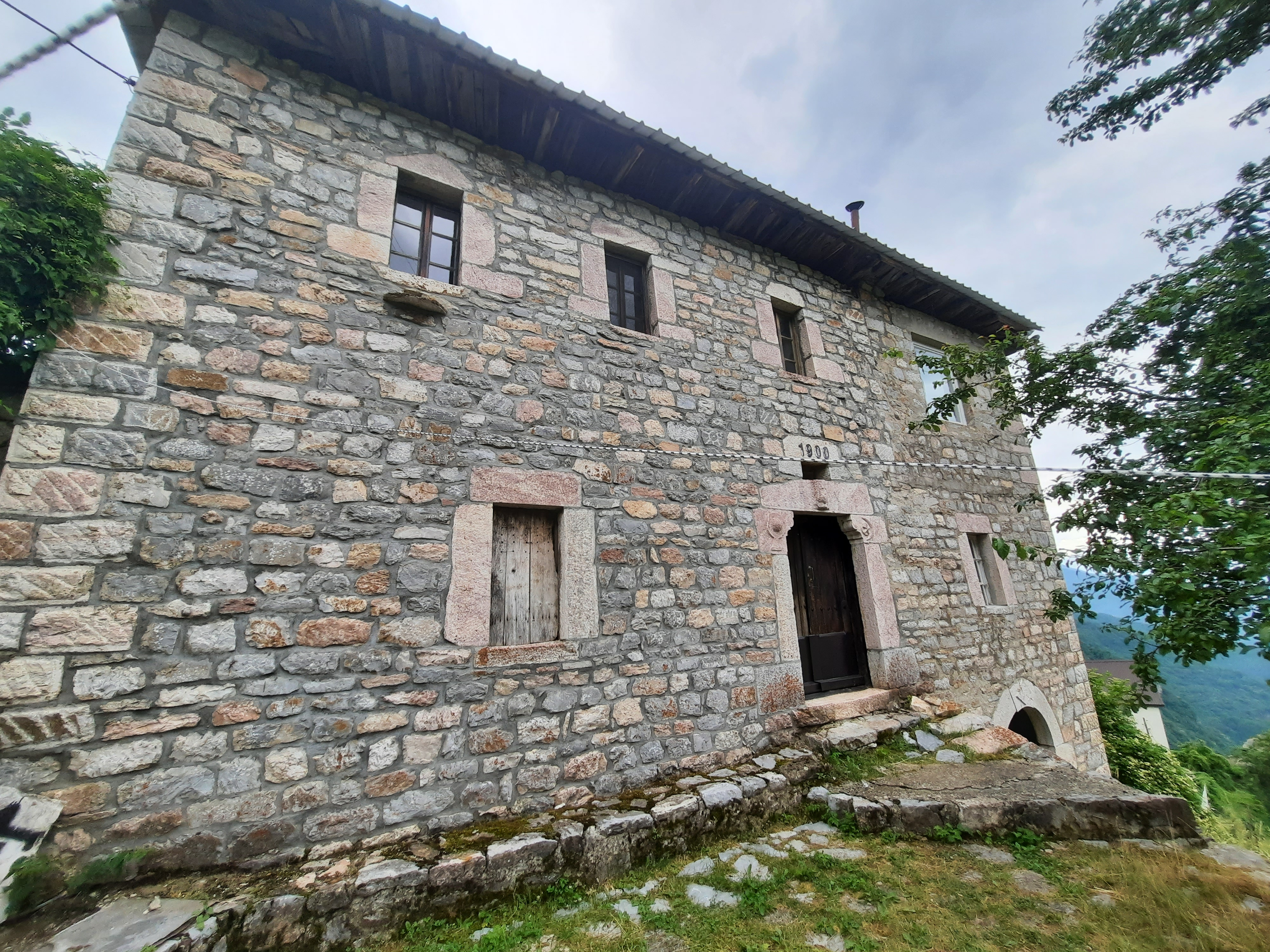
- Interactive map of House of Slavko Brezovski
- 41°35′34.77″N 20°39′08.58″E
- Type: House
- Location: Galičnik, North Macedonia

Site notes
- Governing body: Office for Protection of Cultural Heritage, Ministry of Culture
- Owner: Brezoski family

The House of Slavko Brezovski is a historical house in Galičnik that is listed as Cultural heritage of North Macedonia. It is in ownership of one branch of the family of Brezoski.

== History of the family ==
It is said that their oldest ancestor moved to Galičnik from the village of Brezovo.

=== Notable members of the family ===
- Pejko ― progenitor of the family.
- Iso Brezoski
- Elena Brezoska-Keckaroska ― member and local activist of the League of Communist Youth of Yugoslavia.
- Slavko Brezoski (1922-2017) ― Architect, urban planner, painter and educator partisan during the People's Lberation war of Macedonia. He was an architect who planned the Church of St. Clement of Ohrid in Skopje. His other works are Komunalna banka in Skopje, House of Workers in Skopje, Department Store in Skopje, the hotel Neda in Galičnik, the hotel Slavija in Popova Šapka, Memorial House of Šamarica in Croatia, the Embassy of SFR Yugoslavia in Brasília. He was member of the League of Communist Youth of Yugoslavia and the Communist Party of Yugoslavia.
- Gligor K. Brezoski (1915-1943) ― partisan during the People Lberation war of Macedonia. He was killed during the war in Uljanik, Croatia.
- Velimir Brezoski (1924-1983) ― historian, author of hundreds of papers, scientific advisor at the Institute of National History in Skopje. He is best known as the long-time head of the Documentation Department of the Institute of National History. He was local activist in the mid 20th century.
- Strezo Brezoski ― member of the Board for organizing the Galičnik Wedding Festival.
- Roska Brezoska Markovic ― remarkable and well educated chief surgical nurse in Polog region

== Gallery ==
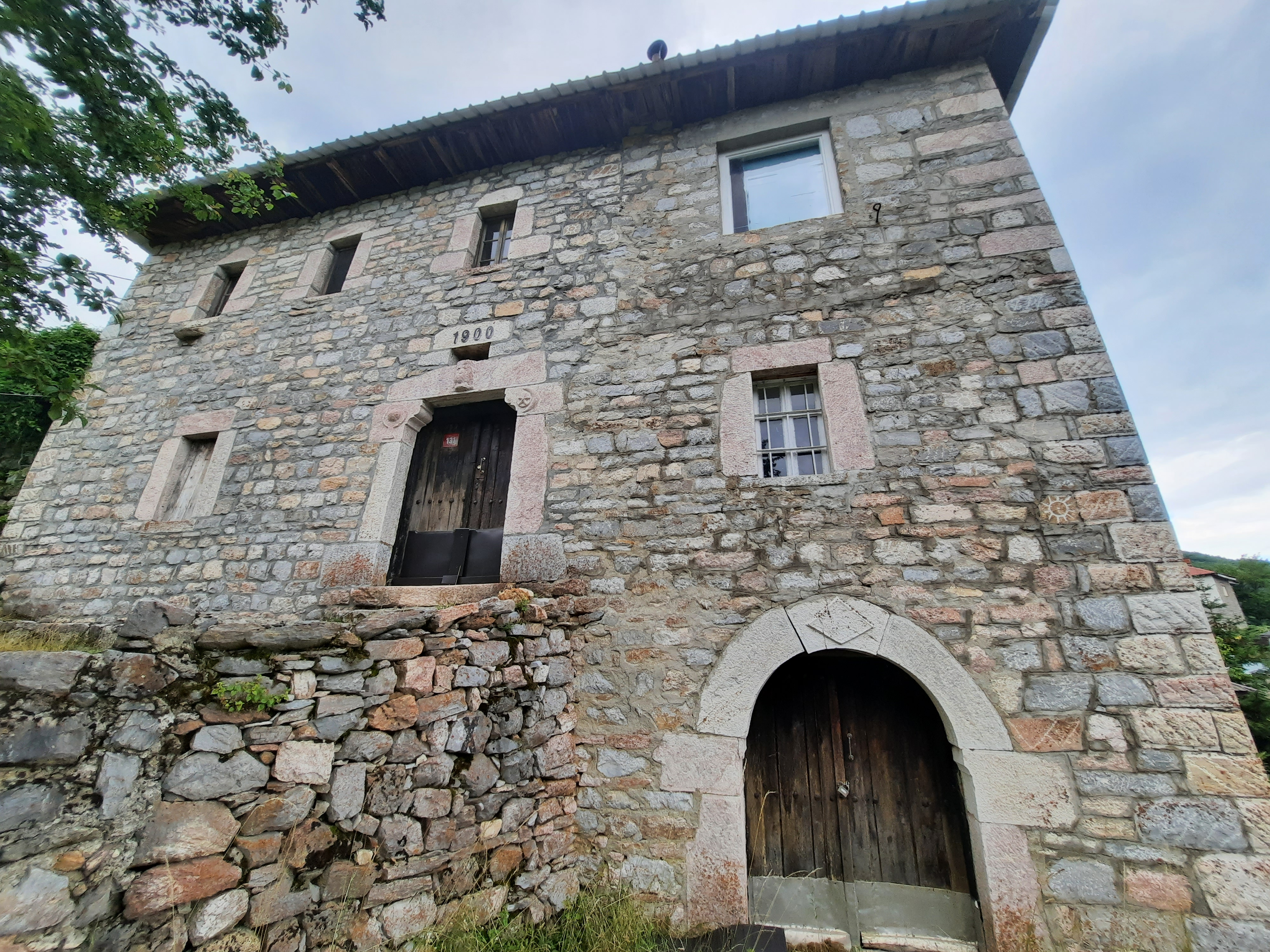
View of the north side

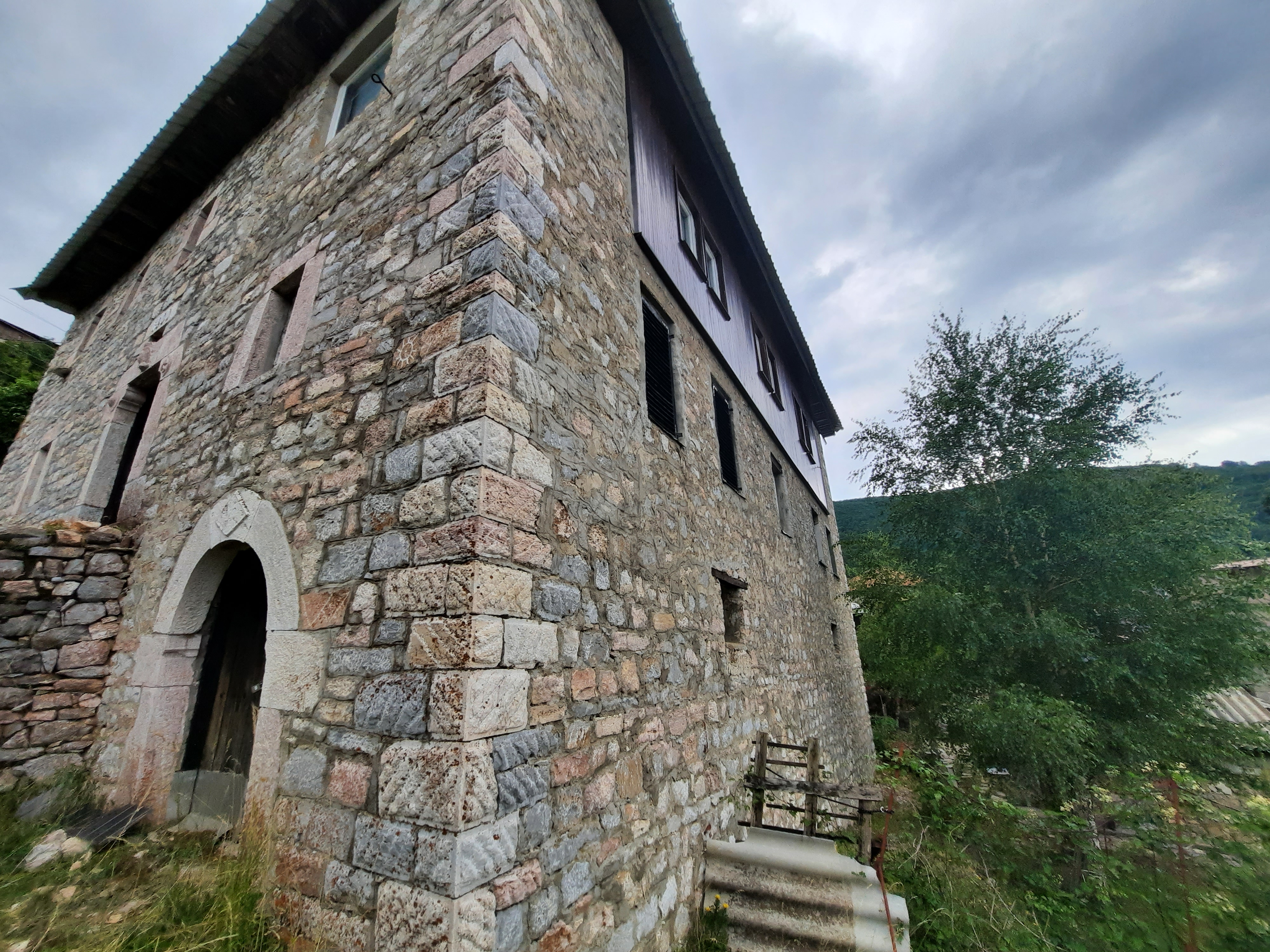
View of the north-west side

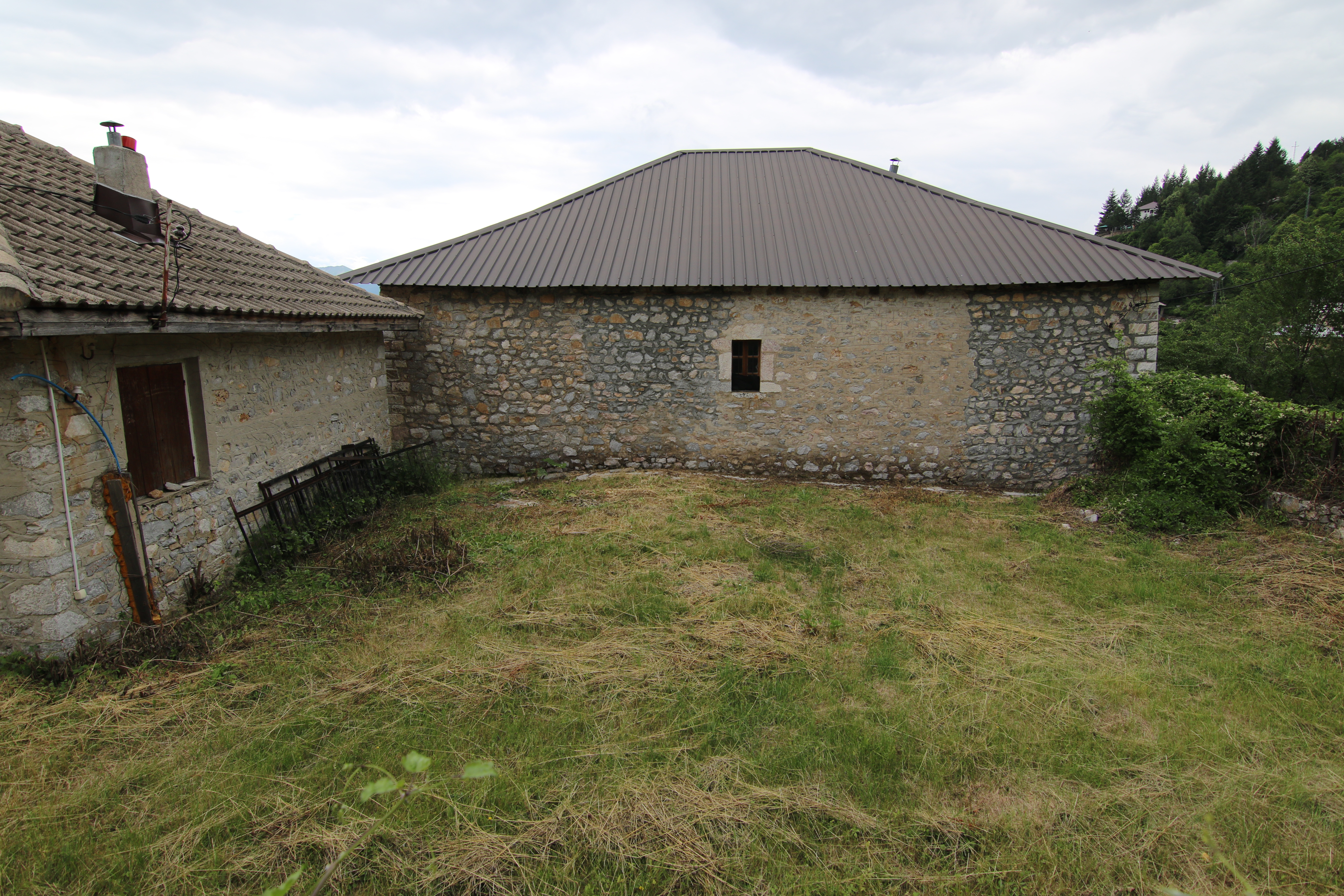
View of the east side

== See also ==
- House of Dokse Lonovski
- House of Todor and Ruse Micovski
- House of Iljo and Strezo Cubalevski
- House of Nikola Kukovski
- Galičnik Wedding Festival
