= Cerova =

Cerova may refer to:

== Slovakia ==
- Cerová, a village and municipality in the Senica District

== Bosnia and Herzegovina ==
- Cerova, Kalinovik, a village in the municipality of Kalinovik, Republika Srpska
- Cerova Ravan, a village in the municipality of Foča, Republika Srpska

== Serbia ==
- Cerova (Arilje), a village the Moravica District
- Cerova (Krupanj), a village in the Mačva District
- Cerova (Kruševac), a village in Rasina District
- Cerova (Pirot), a village
- Cerova, Gornji Milanovac, a village the Moravica District

== See also ==
- Cerovac (disambiguation)
- Cerovo (disambiguation)
