= List of churches in North Macedonia =

This is a list of orthodox churches and monasteries in North Macedonia by diocese.

== Diocese of Skopje ==
=== Northern Skopje ===
Name	Image	Place	Geographic Coordinates	Built in	Notes
Church of the Nativity of the Theotokos		Skopje	41°59′46″N 21°26′22″E		
Church of St. Demetrious		Skopje			
Church of Michael The Archangel		Avtokomanda			
Church of the Ascension of Christ		Madžari			
Church of St. George		Čair			
Church of the Holy Trinity		Bardovci			
Church of St. Naum of Ohrid		Radišani			
Church of St. Nicholas		Radišani			
Monasteries
Monastery of St. George		Krivi Dol			

=== Southern Skopje ===
Name	Image	Place	Geographic Coordinates	Built in	Notes
Church of St. Clement of Ohrid		Skopje	41°59′54″N 21°25′35″E	1990	
Church of the Nativity of the Theotokos		Sredno Vodno			
Church of Sts. Peter and Paul		Gorno Lisiče			
Monasteries
Monastery of St. Andrew		Matka		1389	
Monastery of St. Panteleimon		Gorno; Nerezi	41°58′37.2″N 21°22′26.4″E		
Marko's Monastery of St. Demetrius		Markova; Sušica			
Monastery of St. Nicholas		Šiševo			

== Diocese of Kumanovo and Osogovo ==
Name	Image	Place	Geographic Coordinates	Built in	Notes
Church of St. Nikola		Kumanovo		1860	
Church Holy Trinity		Kumanovo			
St. George's Church		Kumanovo near the city cemetery			
Church St. Archangel Michael		Kumanovo n. Karposh			Under construction
Church St. Petka		Kumanovo n. Bedinje			
Church of Resurrection of Christ		Kumanovo in the city cemetery			Under construction
Church of St. Mina		Kumanovo village Proevce			
Church of St. George		Kumanovo village Tromegje		2011	
Monasteries
Monastery of St. Joachim of Osogovo		Kriva; Palanka		12th century	
Monastery of the Holy Great Martyr George		Staro; Nagoričane		1071; Reconstruction 1313-1318	
Karpino Monastery		Staro; Nagoričane		16th – 17th century	
Psacha Monastery		Staro; Nagoričane		1354	
Matejche Monastery		Matejche, Lipkovo, near Kumanovo		1313	

== Diocese of Tetovo and Gostivar ==
=== Tetovo ===
Name	Image	Place	Geographic Coordinates	Built in	Notes
Church of Sts. Cyril and Methodius		Tetovo			
Church of St. Nicholas		Tenovo			
Monasteries
Monastery of St. Naum of Ohrid		Popova Šapka			

=== Gostivar ===
Name	Image	Place	Geographic Coordinates	Built in	Notes
Church of the Theotokos		Gostivar			
St. Petka Church, Cerovo		Cerovo, Želino	41°43′18.4″N 20°50′29.4″E		

== Diocese of Debar and Kičevo ==
Name	Image	Place	Geographic Coordinates	Built in	Notes
Church of St. John at Kaneo		Ohrid	41°06′40″N 20°47′19″E	13th century	
Church of St. Sophia		Ohrid	41°06′44″N 20°47′39″E	11th century	
Church of St. Mary Peribleptos		Ohrid	41°06′51.5″N 20°47′45″E	1295	
Church of St. Nicholas - Gerakomija		Ohrid		19th century	
Church of Sts. Peter and Paul		Kičevo		1907	
Church of the Holy Mother of God		Makedonski Brod		1872	
Monasteries
Monastery of St. Clement and St. Panteleimon, Plaoshnik		Ohrid	41°06′45.85″N 20°47′28.48″E		
Monastery of St. Naum		29 km south of Ohrid	40°54′50″N 20°44′26″E		
Bigorski Monastery of St John the Baptist		near Rostuša	41°37′19″N 20°36′42″E	1020 (destroyed by the Ottomans in the 16th century and restored in 1743)	

== Diocese of Prespa and Pelagonija ==
=== Bitola ===
Name	Image	Place	Geographic Coordinates	Built in	Notes
Church of St. Demetrius		Bitola		1830	
Church of Nativity of the Theotokos		Bitola			
St. Theodore of Amasea Church		Dolno Srpci			

=== Prilep ===
Name	Image	Place	Geographic Coordinates	Built in	Notes
Church of the Annuncioation		Prilep	41°20′36.5″N 21°33′29″E	1838	
Church of Sts. Cyril and Methodius		Prilep			
Church of the Transfiguration		Prilep		1871	
Monasteries
Monastery of the Transfiguration; Zrze monastery		Zrze	41°31′16″N 21°20′30″E		
Monastery of the Holy Archangel Michael; Varoš monastery		Prilep	41°21′38.2″N 21°32′04″E		
Monastery of the Assumption of Mary; Treskavec Monastery		Prilep		12th century	
Monastery of St. Nicholas		Manastir			

=== Resen ===
Name	Image	Place	Geographic Coordinates	Built in	Notes
Church of St. George		Resen			
Church of St. George, Kurbinovo		Kurbinovo		1191	

=== Kruševo and Demir Hisar ===
Name	Image	Place	Geographic Coordinates	Built in	Notes
Church of St. Nicholas		Kruševo		1907	
Church of the Holy Trinity		Kruševo			
Monasteries
Monastery of the St. John the Baptist		Slepče			
Monastery of St. Athanasius		Žurče			

== Diocese of Strumica ==
Name	Image	Place	Geographic Coordinates	Built in	Notes
Churches
Monasteries
Monastery of the Holy Archangel Michael		Berovo			
Monastery of the Dormition of the Most Holy Theotokos		Berovo		1975 (near oldest church, which was ruined)	
Monastery of the Most; Holy Theotokos Eleusa		Veljusa			
Monastery of the St. Leontius		Vodoča			

== Diocese of Bregalnica ==
Name	Image	Place	Geographic Coordinates	Built in	Notes
Church of the Holy Trinity		Radoviš	41°38′06″N 22°28′03″E	2003	
Church of St. George		Kočani	41°55′25″N 22°24′31″E		
Church of St. Nicholas		Štip			
Church of the Archangel Michael		Vinica			
Monasteries

== Diocese of Povardarie ==
Name	Image	Place	Geographic Coordinates	Built in	Notes
Church of St. Pantaleon		Veles			
Church of Sts. Cyril and Methodius		Veles			
Church of the Dormition of Theotokos		Veles		1882	
Church of the Assumption of Mary		Demir Kapija		1937	
Monasteries
