= Cerovo =

Cerovo may refer to:

== Bosnia and Herzegovina ==
- Cerovo, Neum

== North Macedonia ==
- Cerovo, Želino

== Montenegro ==
- Cerovo, Bijelo Polje
- Cerovo, Nikšić

== Serbia ==
- Cerovo (Ražanj)
- Cerovo mine, in Ražanj

== Slovakia ==
- Cerovo, Slovakia

== Slovenia ==
- Cerovo, Grosuplje
- Dolnje Cerovo, in the Municipality of Brda
- Gornje Cerovo, in the Municipality of Brda

== See also ==
- Cerova (disambiguation)
