= House of Nikola Kukovski =

Cultural heritage of Macedonia in Galičnik

- Куќа на Никола Куковски; Kukja na Nikola Kukovski (Macedonian)
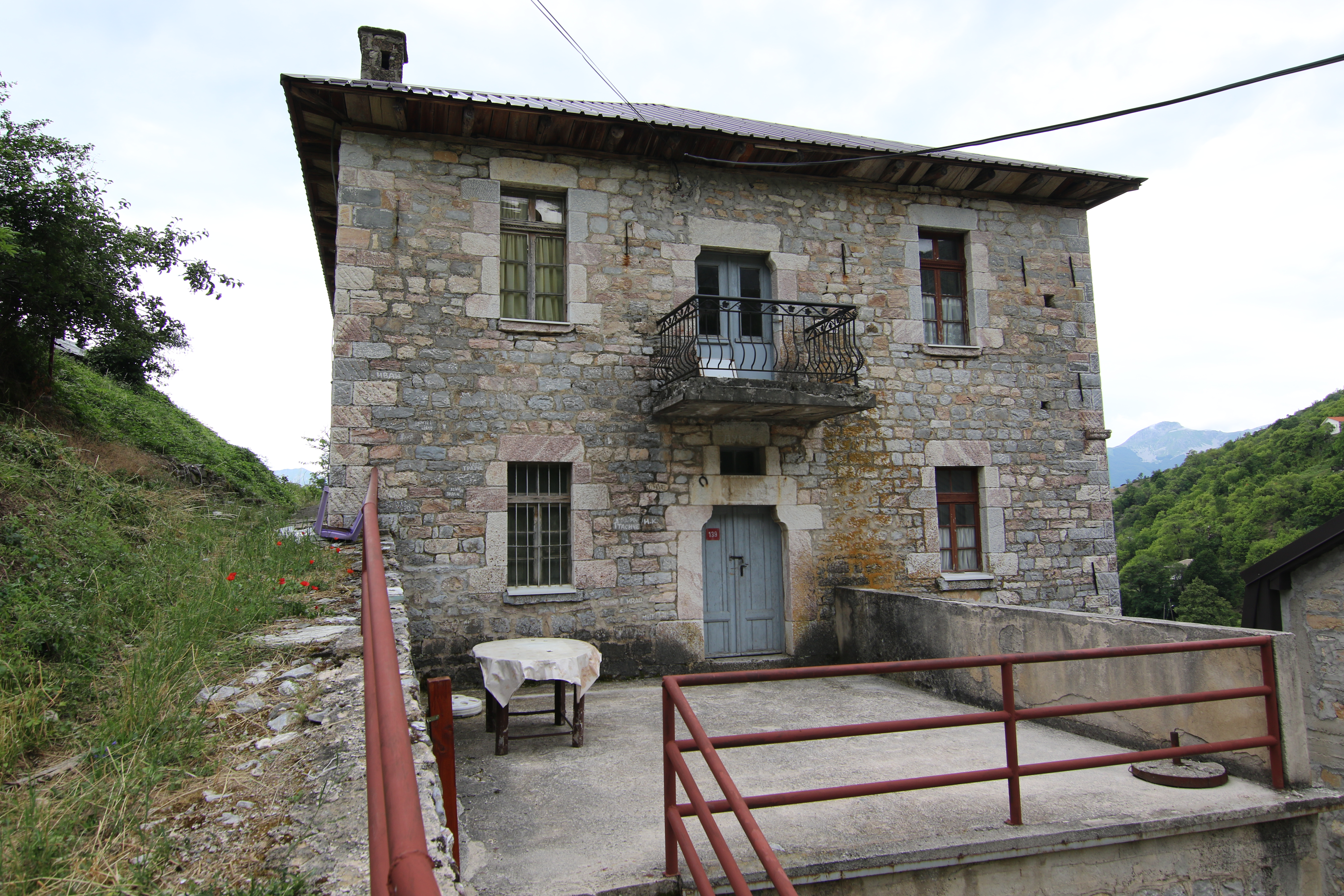
- Interactive map of House of Nikola Kukovski
- 41°35′35.56″N 20°38′55.44″E
- Type: House
- Location: Galičnik, North Macedonia

Site notes
- Governing body: Office for Protection of Cultural Heritage, Ministry of Culture
- Owner: Kukovski family

The House of Nikola Kukovski is a historical house in Galičnik that is listed as Cultural heritage of North Macedonia. It is in ownership of one branch of the family of Kukovski.

== See also ==
- House of Dokse Lonovski
- House of Todor and Ruse Micovski
- House of Iljo and Strezo Cubalevski
- House of Slavko Brezovski
- Galičnik Wedding Festival
