= House of Todor and Ruse Micovski =

- Куќа на Тодор и Русе Мицовски; Kukja na Todor i Ruse Micovski (Macedonian)
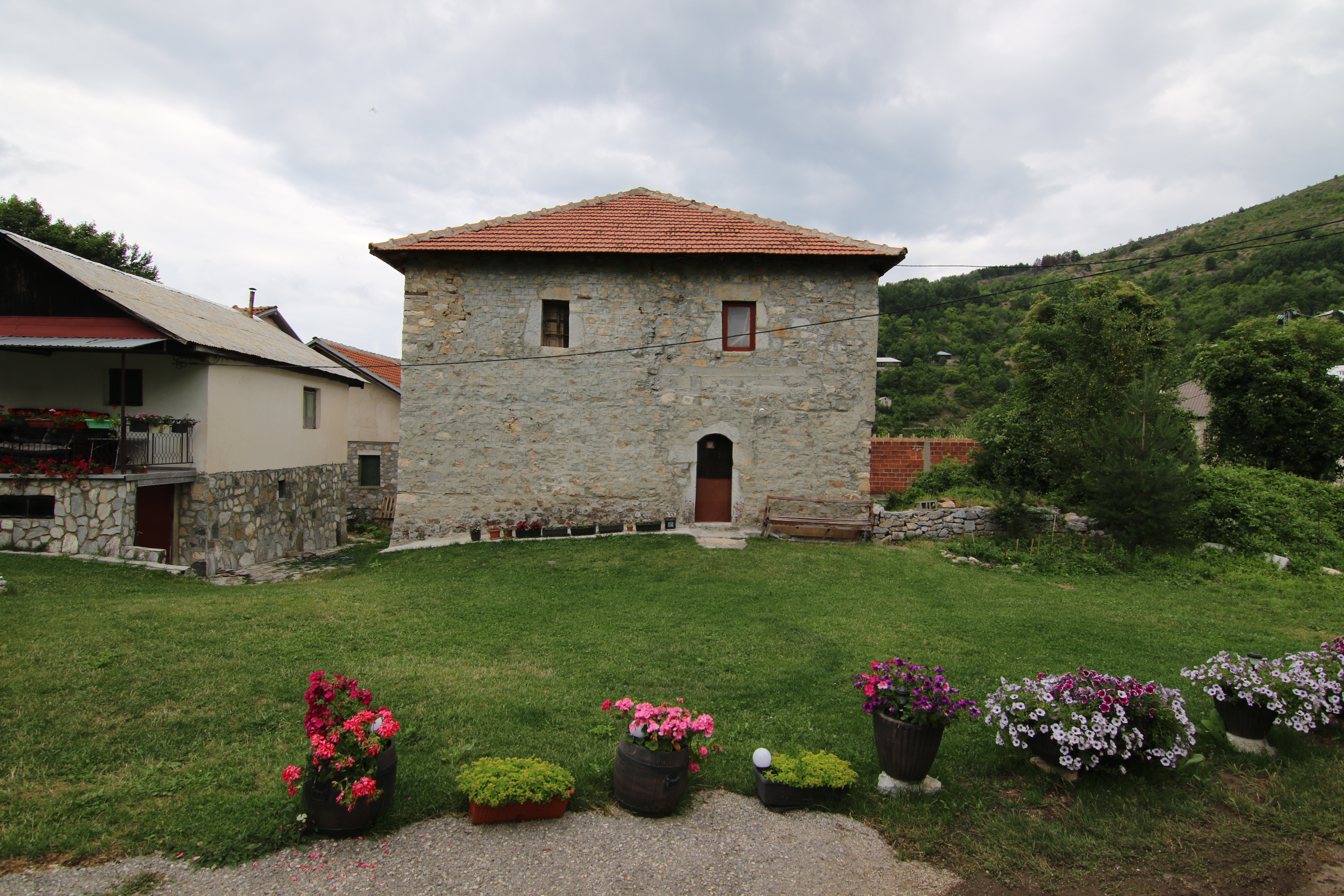
- Interactive map of House of Todor and Ruse Micovski
- 41°35′33.33″N 20°39′10.38″E
- Type: House
- Location: Galičnik, North Macedonia

Site notes
- Governing body: Office for Protection of Cultural Heritage, Ministry of Culture
- Owner: Micovski family

The House of Todor and Ruse Micovski is a historical house in Galičnik that is listed as Cultural heritage of North Macedonia. It is in ownership of one branch of the family of Micovski.

== See also ==
- House of Dokse Lonovski
- House of Slavko Brezovski
- House of Iljo and Strezo Cubalevski
- House of Nikola Kukovski
- Galičnik Wedding Festival
