= Cerovac =

Cerovac may refer to:

== Bosnia and Herzegovina ==
- Cerovac, Tešanj
- Cerovac, Trebinje

== Croatia ==
- Cerovac Barilovićki, a village near Barilović
- Cerovac, Osijek-Baranja County, a village near Bizovac
- Cerovac, Požega-Slavonia County, a village near Jakšić
- Cerovac, Zadar County, a village near Gračac

== Serbia ==
- Cerovac (Kragujevac), a village in Šumadija District
- Cerovac (Šabac), a village in Mačva District
- Cerovac (Smederevska Palanka), a village in Podunavlje District

== See also ==
- Cerovac Vukmanićki, a village near Karlovac, Croatia
- Cerovo (disambiguation)
