= Slepče =

Slepče may refer to:

- Slepče, Demir Hisar, North Macedonia
- Slepče, Dolneni, North Macedonia
