= Stokovna Kukja NaMa Skopje =

Historic building in North Macedonia

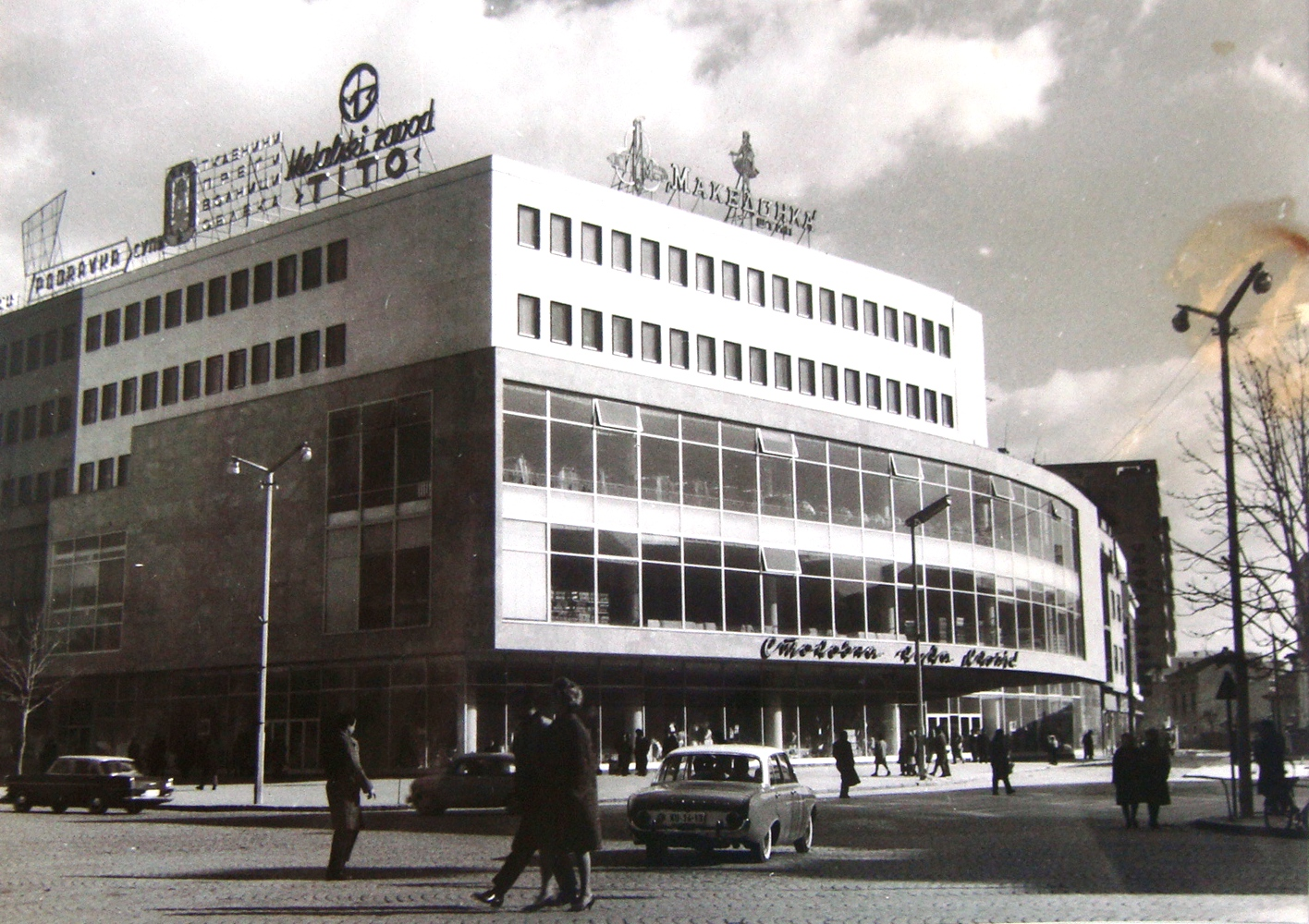
- Stokovna Kukja Skopje, 1962
- Interactive map of the Stokovna Kukja NaMa Skopje area

General information
- Architectural style: Modern architecture
- Location: Skopje, North Macedonia
- Coordinates: 41.9957°N 21.4319°E,
- Completed: 1960

Design and construction
- Architect: Slavko Brezoski

Stokovna Kukja NaMa (Macedonian: Стоковна Куќа) is a department store built in 1960, it represents an early example of modernist architecture in North Macedonia. The building is centrally located in Macedonia Square, Skopje in the very heart of the city centre of Skopje. The building is a work of High modernism. The buildings facade was damaged by the reconstruction for Skopje 2014. It was designed by architect Slavko Brezoski prior to the 1963 Skopje earthquake.
