= Brezovo, Demir Hisar =

Brezovo Брезово
- Village
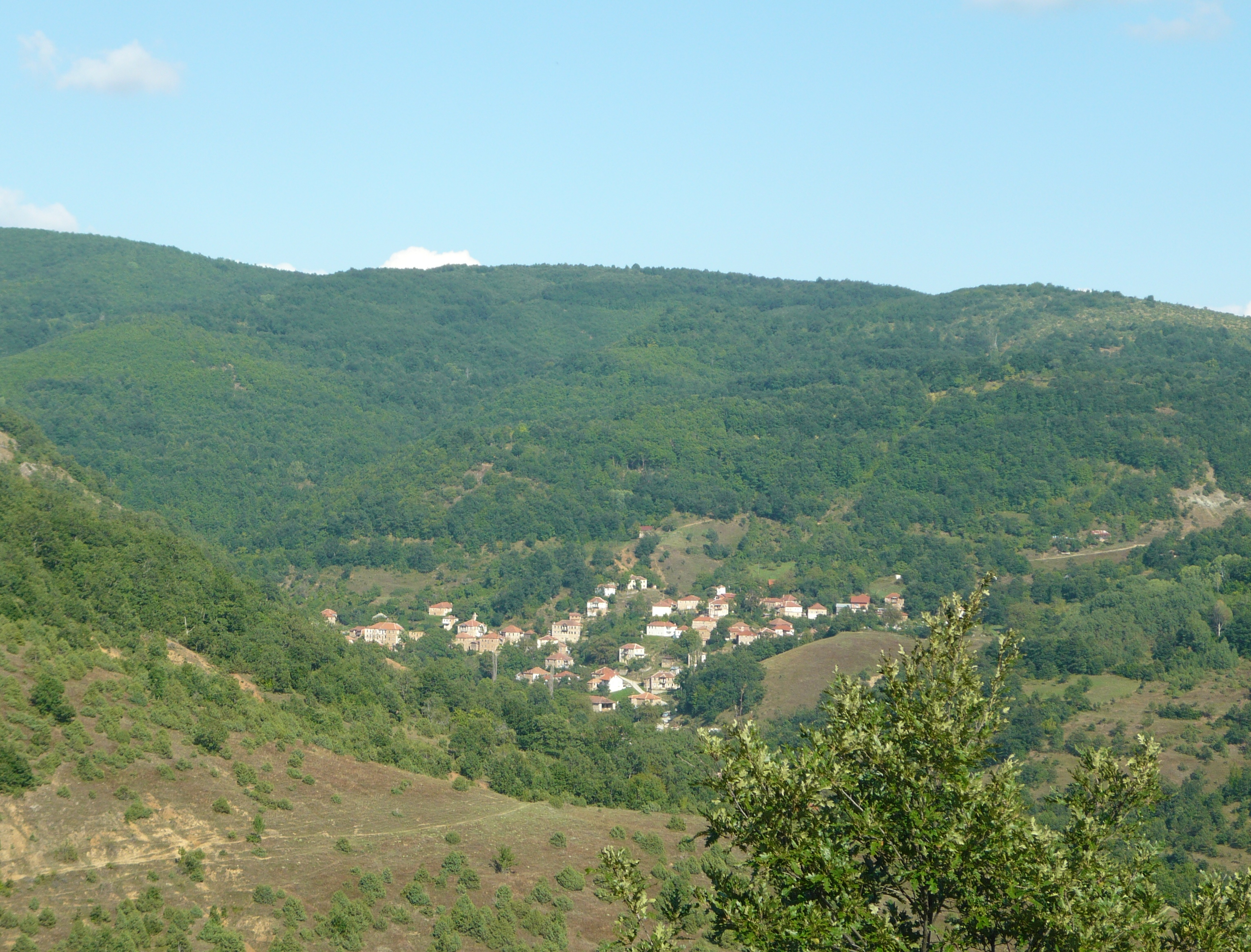

- Location within North Macedonia
- Coordinates: 41.341944°N 21.126944°E
- Country: North Macedonia
- Region: Pelagonia
- Municipality: Demir Hisar

Population (2002)
  - Total: 62
- Time zone: UTC+1 (CET)
  - Summer (DST): UTC+2 (CEST)
- Website: .

Brezovo (Macedonian: Брезово) is a village in the municipality of Demir Hisar, North Macedonia.

== Demographics ==
In the 1467/1468 Ottoman defter, the village had 35 households and 4 bachelors. The onomastics consisted almost entirely of Christian Slavic anthroponyms, with only a single instance of an Albanian anthroponym, Lazor.

In statistics gathered by Vasil Kanchov in 1900, the village of Brezovo was inhabited by 560 Christian Bulgarians.

According to the 2002 census, the village had a total of 62 inhabitants. Ethnic groups in the village include:

- Macedonians 62
