= Žurče =

Žurče Журче
- Village
- Location within North Macedonia
- Coordinates: 41.283514°N 21.235315°E
- Country: North Macedonia
- Region: Pelagonia
- Municipality: Demir Hisar

Population (2002)
  - Total: 255
- Time zone: UTC+1 (CET)
  - Summer (DST): UTC+2 (CEST)
- Website: .

Žurče (Macedonian: Журче) is a village in the municipality of Demir Hisar, North Macedonia.

== Demographics ==
Žurče is attested in the Ottoman defter of 1467/68 as a village in the vilayet of Manastir. The village had 55 households, 16 widows and 3 bachelors. The inhabitants attested almost exclusively bore typical Slavic anthroponyms, with only a few instances of Albanian ones, such as Petre Arbanash.

According to the 2002 census, the village had a total of 255 inhabitants. Ethnic groups in the village include:

- Macedonians 254
- Aromanians 1
