= Slavko Brezoski =

Macedonian architect (1922–2017)

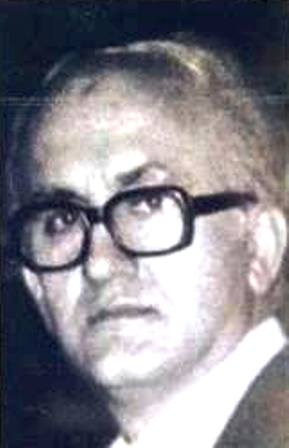
- Born: 10 June 1922; Galičnik, Kingdom of Serbs, Croats and Slovenes
- Died: 7 March 2017 (aged 94); Skopje, Macedonia
- Occupation: Architect
- Buildings: Church of St. Clement of Ohrid, Stokovna Kukja NaMa Skopje
- Website: www.slavkobrezoski.com

Slavko Brezoski (Macedonian: Славко Брезоски; 10 June 1922 – 7 March 2017) was a Macedonian architect, urban planner, painter, writer and educator known for his works in the genre of modern architecture realised during the middle of the 20th century in modern-day North Macedonia, Serbia, Croatia, Brazil and Libya. He was a professor and Dean at the Faculty of Architecture at the Ss. Cyril and Methodius University of Skopje.

== Life ==
Born 1922 in Galičnik, Kingdom of Yugoslavia, Brezoski graduated in architecture at the University of Belgrade in 1950. Upon completing studies, he returned to Skopje and became a member of the art collective 'Denes' alongside Janko Konstantinov and Risto Šekerinski. Worked for design studio "Proektant" from 1950 to 1961, building company "Pelagonia" from 1961 to 1963. The winner of the national competition for the design of the Yugoslav Embassy in Brasília. Travelled and worked with the construction team in Brasília from 1962 to 1963. Following the 1963 Skopje earthquake he returned to join the planning and rebuilding of the city and worked for the design company "Makedonija Proekt" from 1963 to 1966. Worked in Libya from 1966 to 1969 as a technical support and adviser to the Kingdom of Libya. Became professor and Dean of the Faculty for Architecture at the University of Skopje Cyril and Methodius from 1970 to 1987.

== Architecture ==
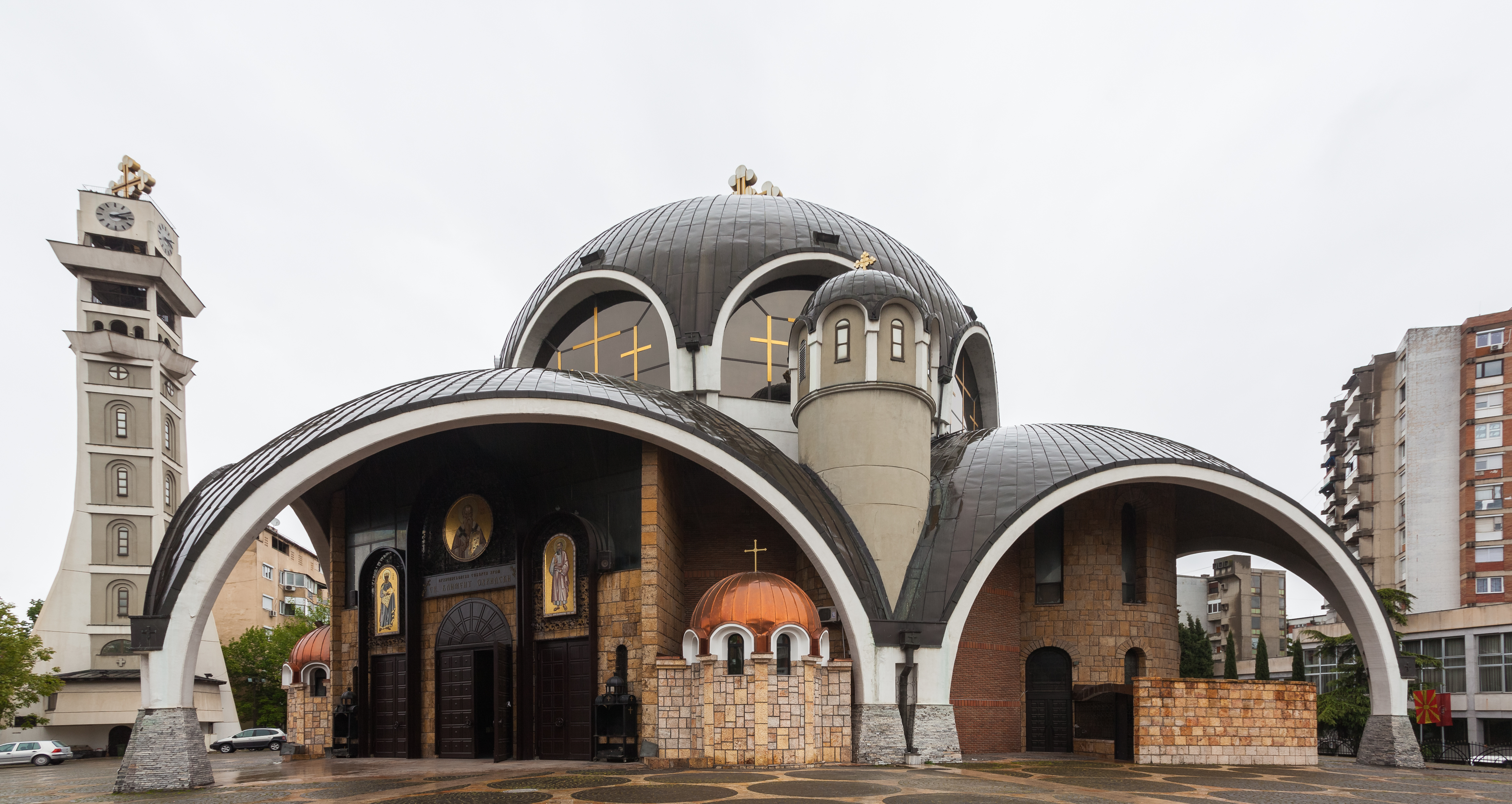
Orthodox Cathedral Saint Clement of Ohrid, Skopje, 1972

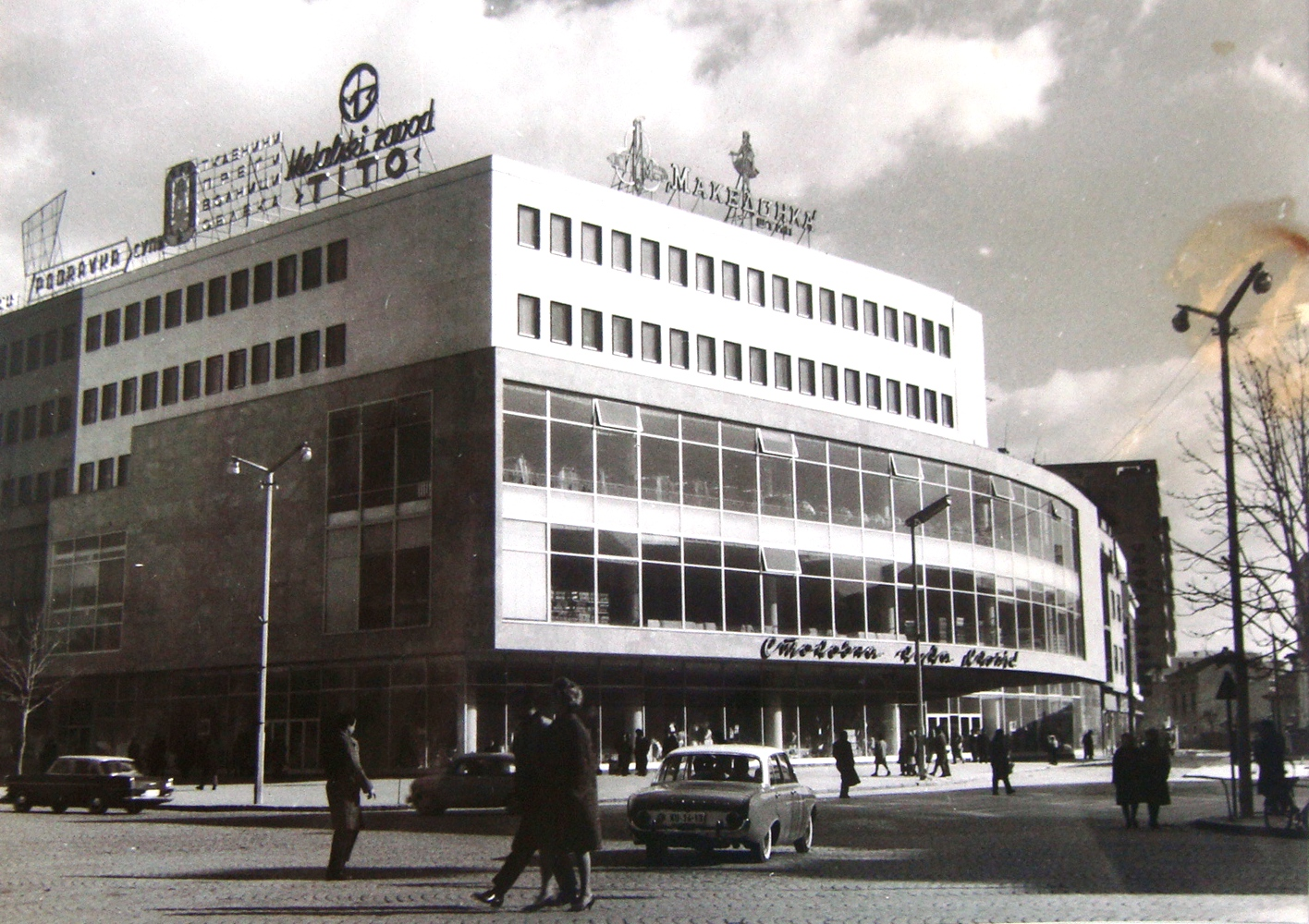
Stokovna Kukja NaMa, Skopje, 1960

Brezoski designed and built modernist buildings in Socialist Federal Republic of Yugoslavia (SFRY). He was part of the first generation of modernists in postwar Architecture of Yugoslavia. He realised a large number of core projects including office, public and residential buildings. Realised projects in the former Yugoslav republics, Brazil and Libya.

Designed a style of modernism based on interest in human architecture that shapes a positive society and a belief in progress, or moving forward. Bold meaning and experimental new style and form, that relies on contemporary materials. His work was based on an analytical programmatic approach to the function of buildings and a rational use of new materials and structural innovation. The emphasis is on volume, composition, and minimal ornamentation, experimentation with form-shapes, colours, lines.

His buildings are characterized by clean, minimal lines; extensive use of glass to enhance natural light; structured floor plans; a combination of modern and traditional materials; and attention to integration with the surrounding environment.

He was influenced by Le Corbusier and other classical modernists but with a deeply rooted spirit of a traditional Balkan neimar. Brezoski's architecture has been a prominent influence on the Architecture of North Macedonia and Architecture of Yugoslavia.

== Works ==
- Bank Building 'Komunalna Banka', predecessor to Komercijalna banka Skopje in 1956
- High Rise "Papagal" Skopje 1957
- Department Store 'Stokovna Kukja NaMa', Skopje in 1960.
- Multi-story office building 'Rabotnički Dom', Skopje in 1962
- Yugoslav Embassy in Brazil, Brasília in 1963
- Idris Housing Complex, Tripoli, Libya 1968
- Hotel Slavija, Popova Šapka
- Orthodox Cathedral Church of St. Clement of Ohrid in 1972–1990
- Retreat Šamarica, Zrinska Gora, Croatia in 1980
- Hotel 'Neda' Galičnik in 1980

== Awards ==
- Awarded, "11 October" Republic Award, in the field of Culture and Art for the building of "Rabotnički Dom" in 1963
- Awarded, City of Skopje Award "13 November", 1964.
- Award at the Biannual of Macedonian Architecture 1981.
- Received the Andrey Damyanov Award for Architecture in 1993, for his lifetime achievements as an architect and for his contribution to the development of Macedonian architecture

== Books ==
Publications by Slavko Brezoski in Macedonian

- Rekanska Kukja: Arhitektonsko Nasledstvo vo Makedonija, Skopje, 1993
- ZaArhitektonskiRaboti, published by the Faculty of Architecture of the University of Skopje in 2007

== Gallery ==
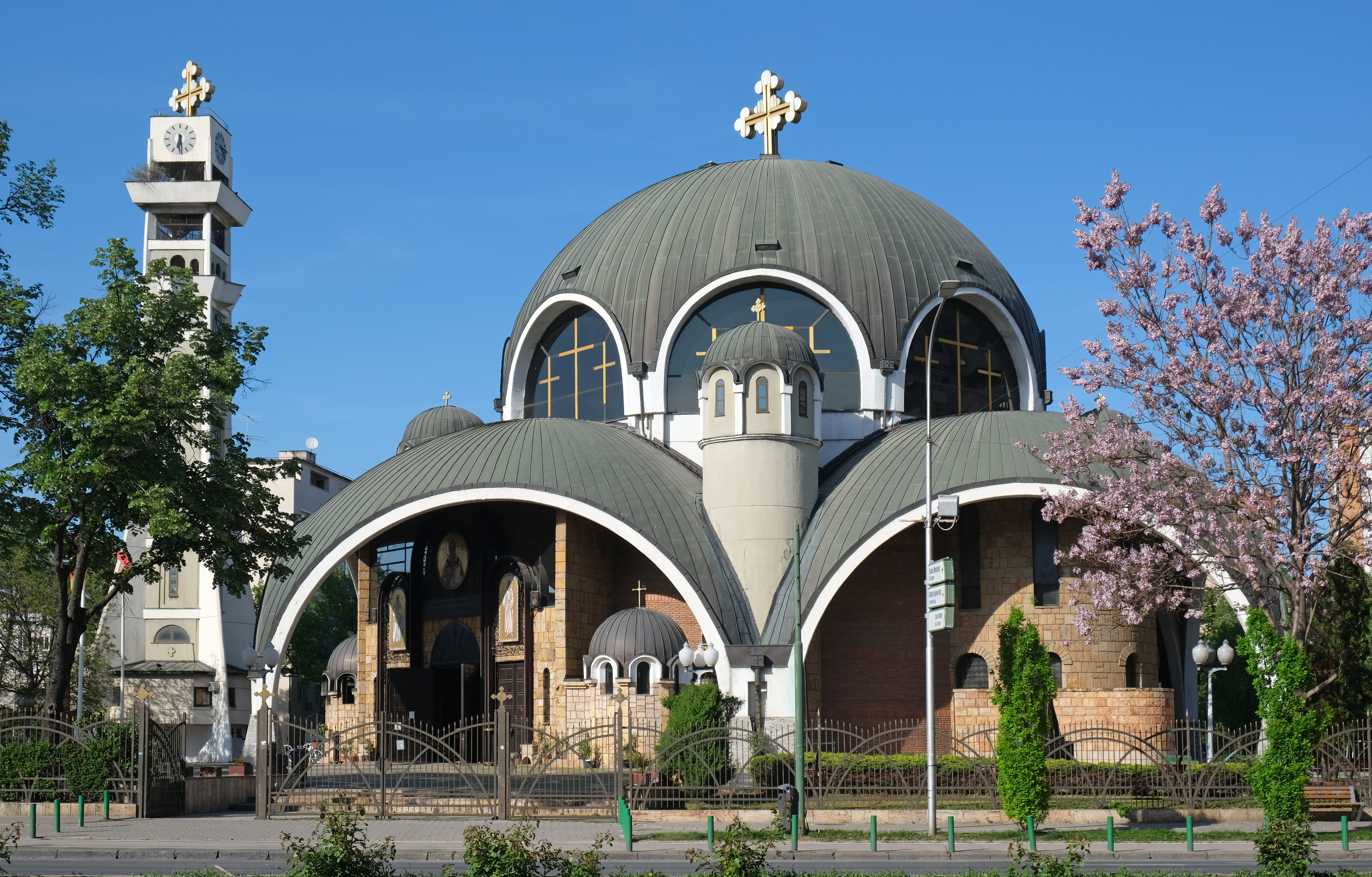
Orthodox Cathedral Saint Clement of Ohrid, Skopje, 1972

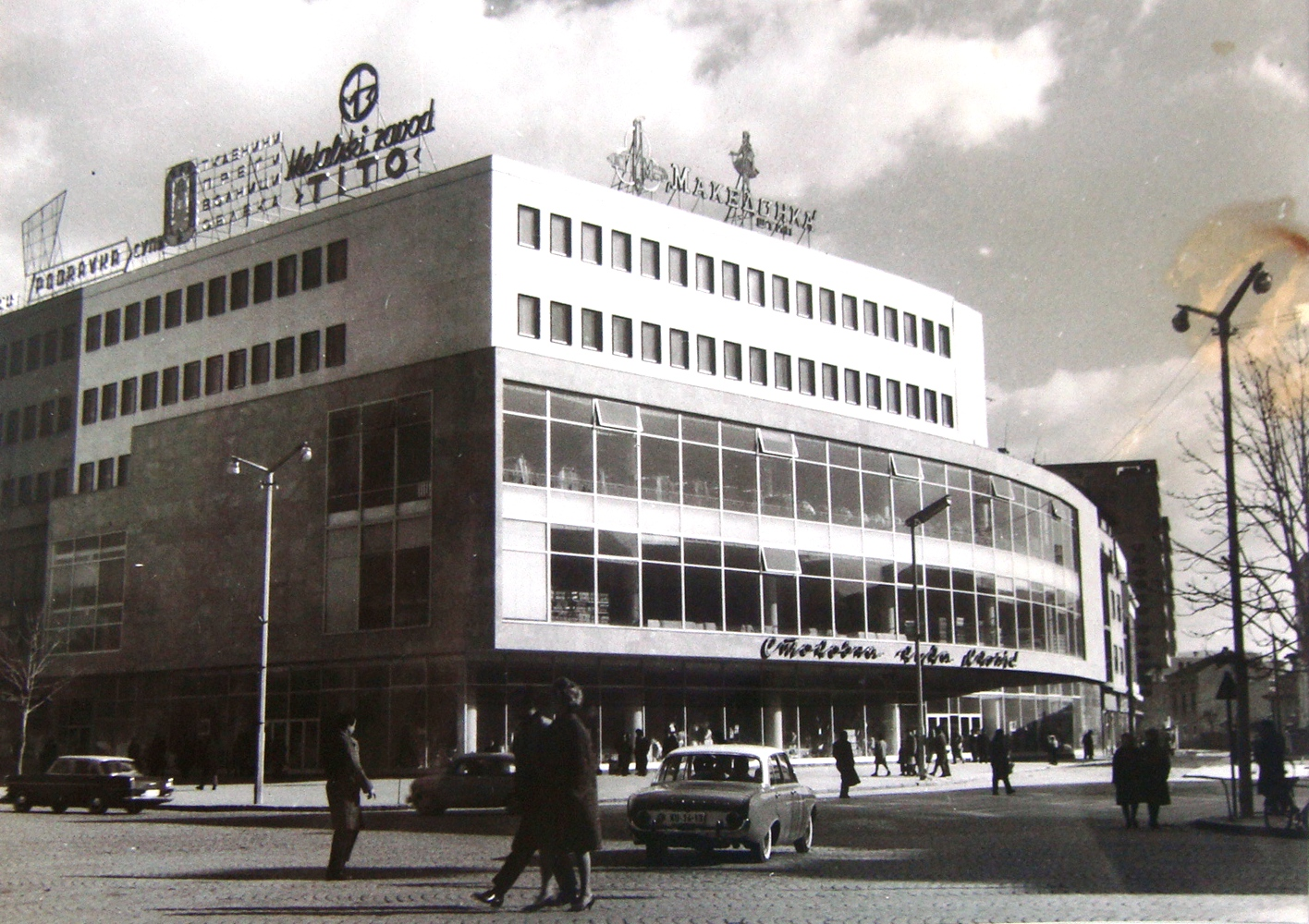
Stokovna Kukja NaMa, Skopje, 1960

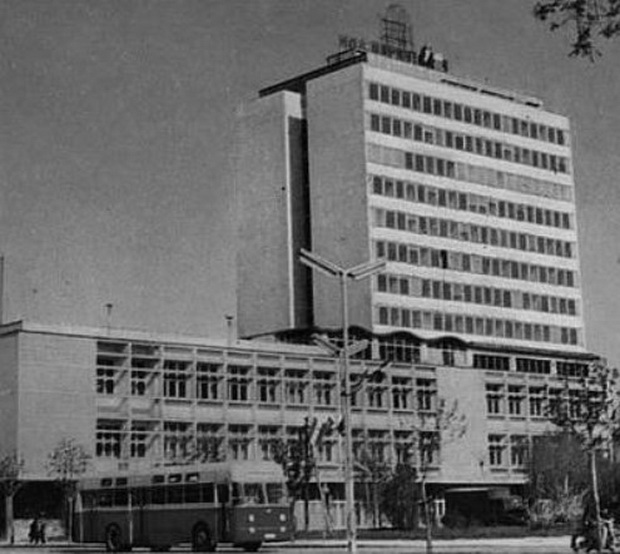
Rabotnički Dom, Worker unions building 1963

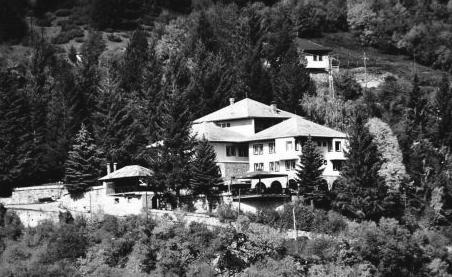
Hotel Neda, Galičnik, 1983

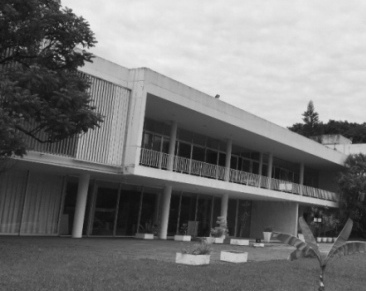
Yugoslav Embassy in Brazil 1963

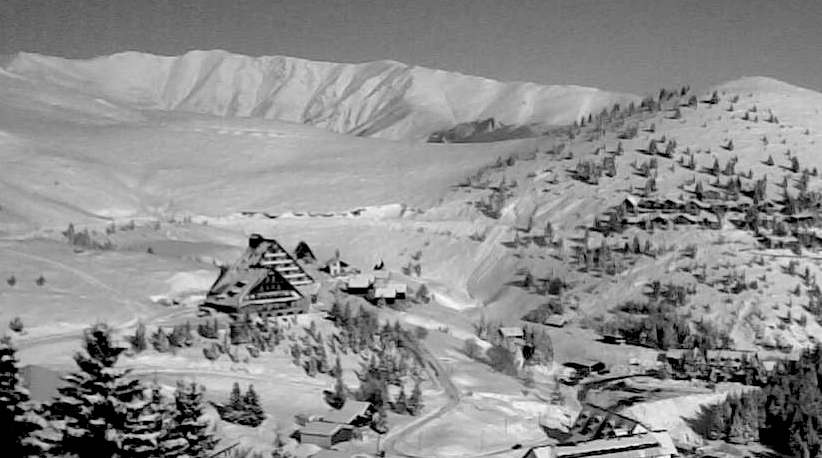
Hotel Slavija by Slavko Brezoski 1960s

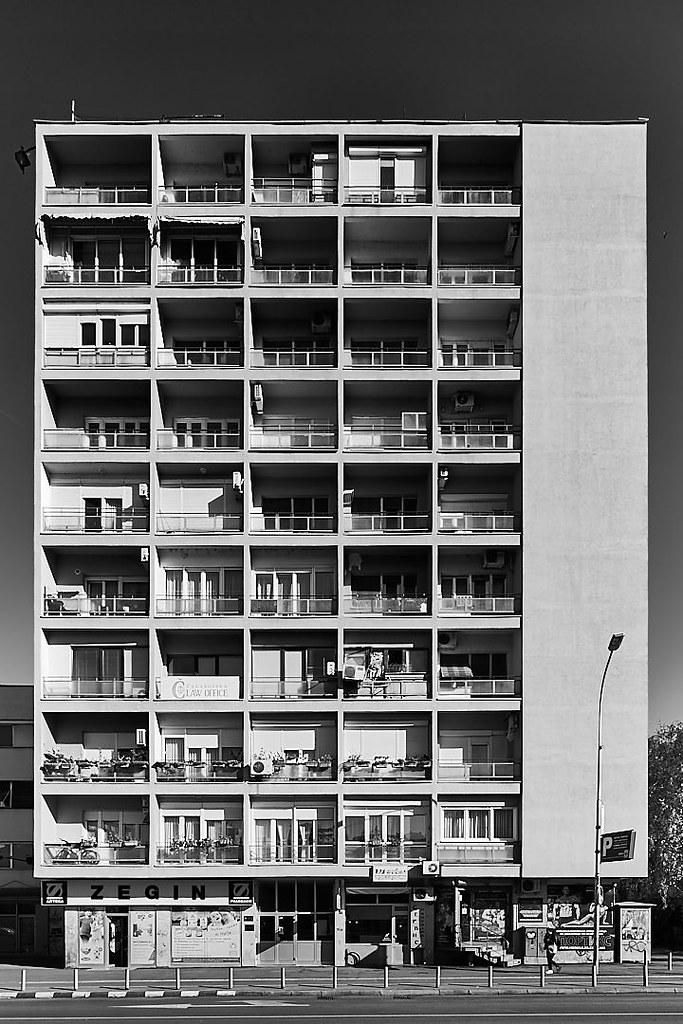
Apartment Block 'Papagal' 1957

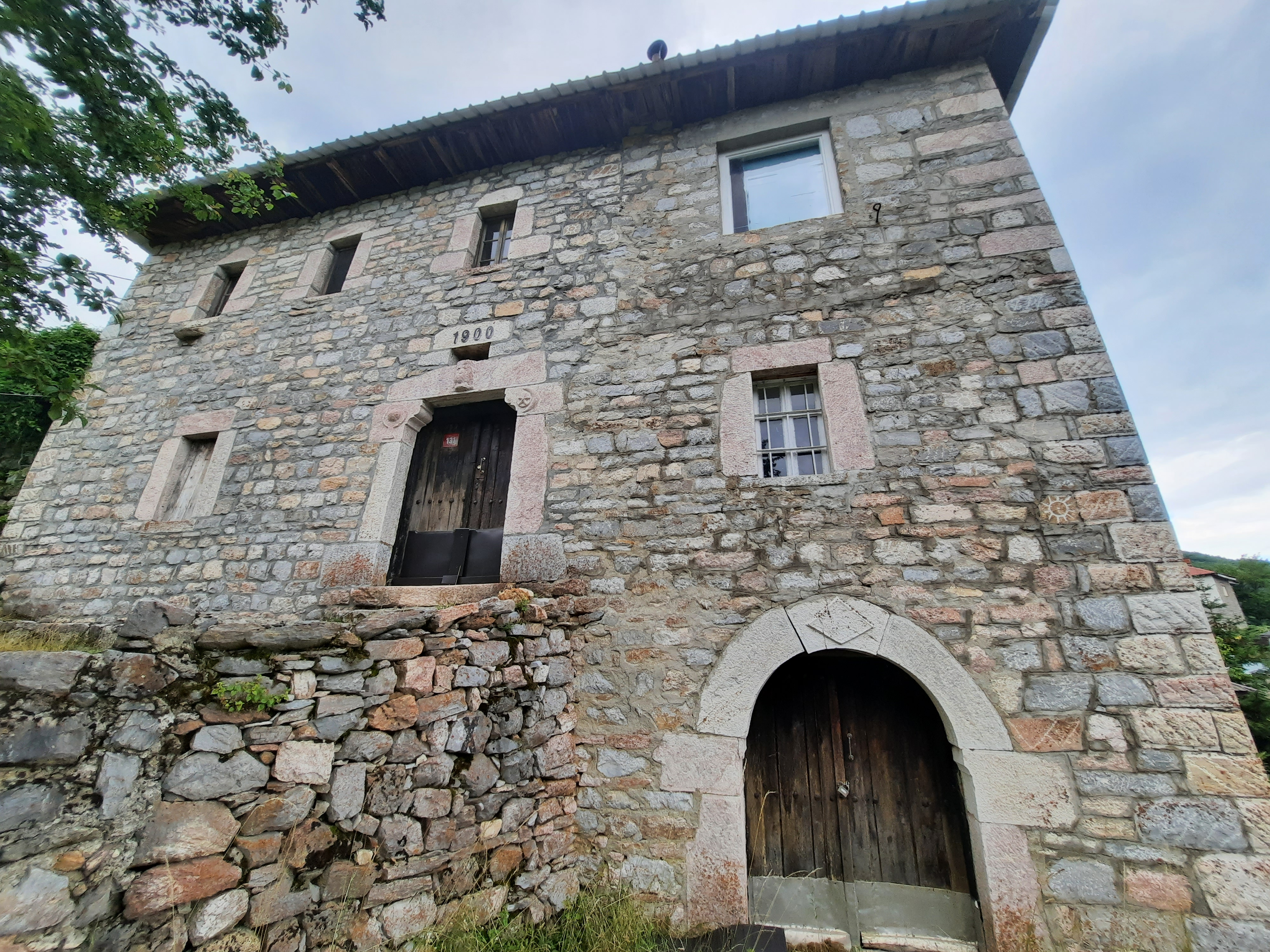
Family home in Galičnik, 1922
