= Church of St. Clement of Ohrid =

Cathedral in Skopje, North Macedonia

Church of Saint Clement of Ohrid
- Soborna Crkva
- Св. Климент Охридски
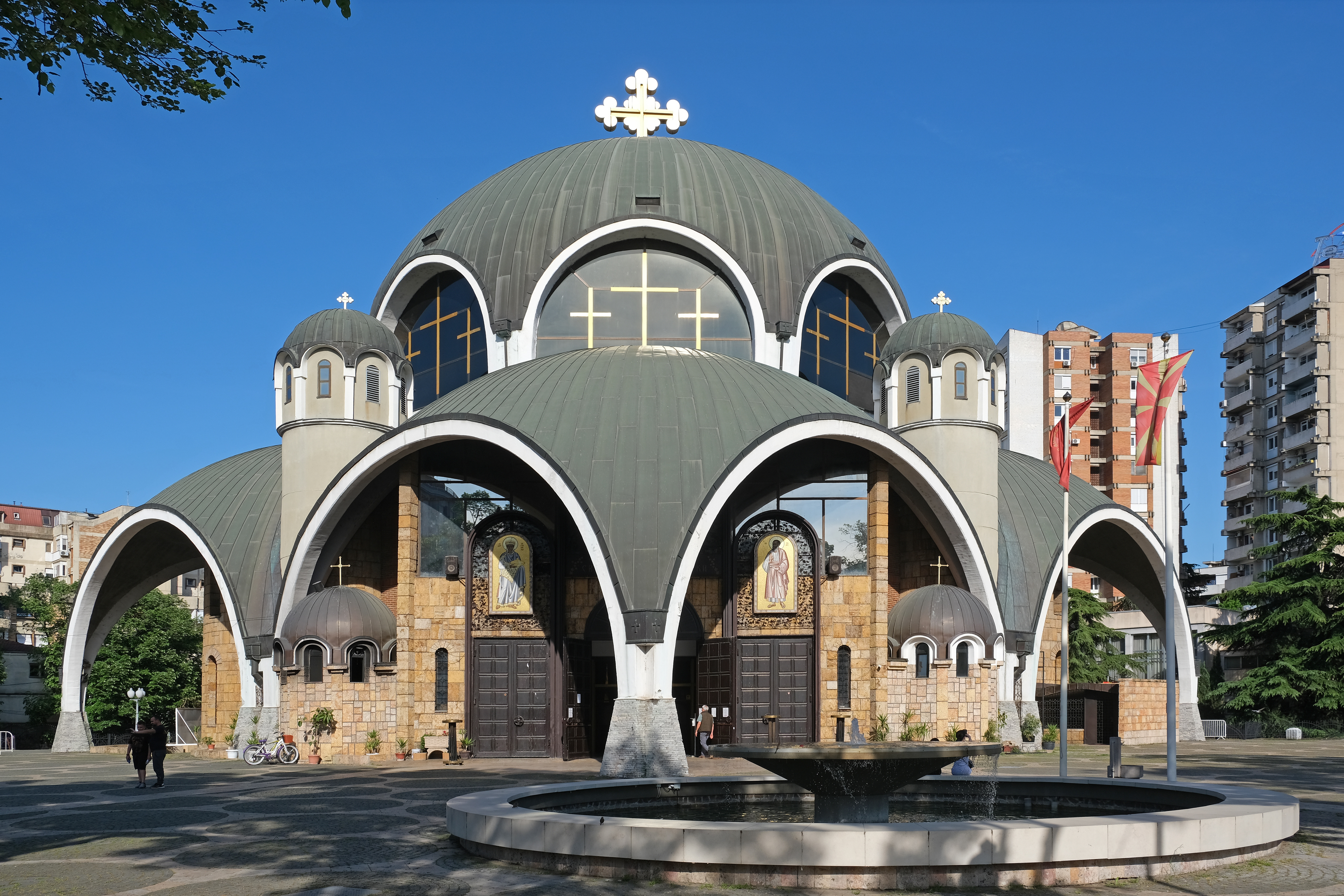
- The church
- Church of Saint Clement of Ohrid
- 41°59′55″N 21°25′35″E
- Location: Skopje, Centar
- Country: Republic of North Macedonia
- Denomination: Eastern Orthodox Church
- Churchmanship: Macedonian Orthodox Church

History
- Status: Cathedral
- Dedication: Clement of Ohrid
- Consecrated: 12 August 1990

Architecture
- Architect: Slavko Brezoski
- Architectural type: Church
- Style: Modernist
- Years built: 1972-1990
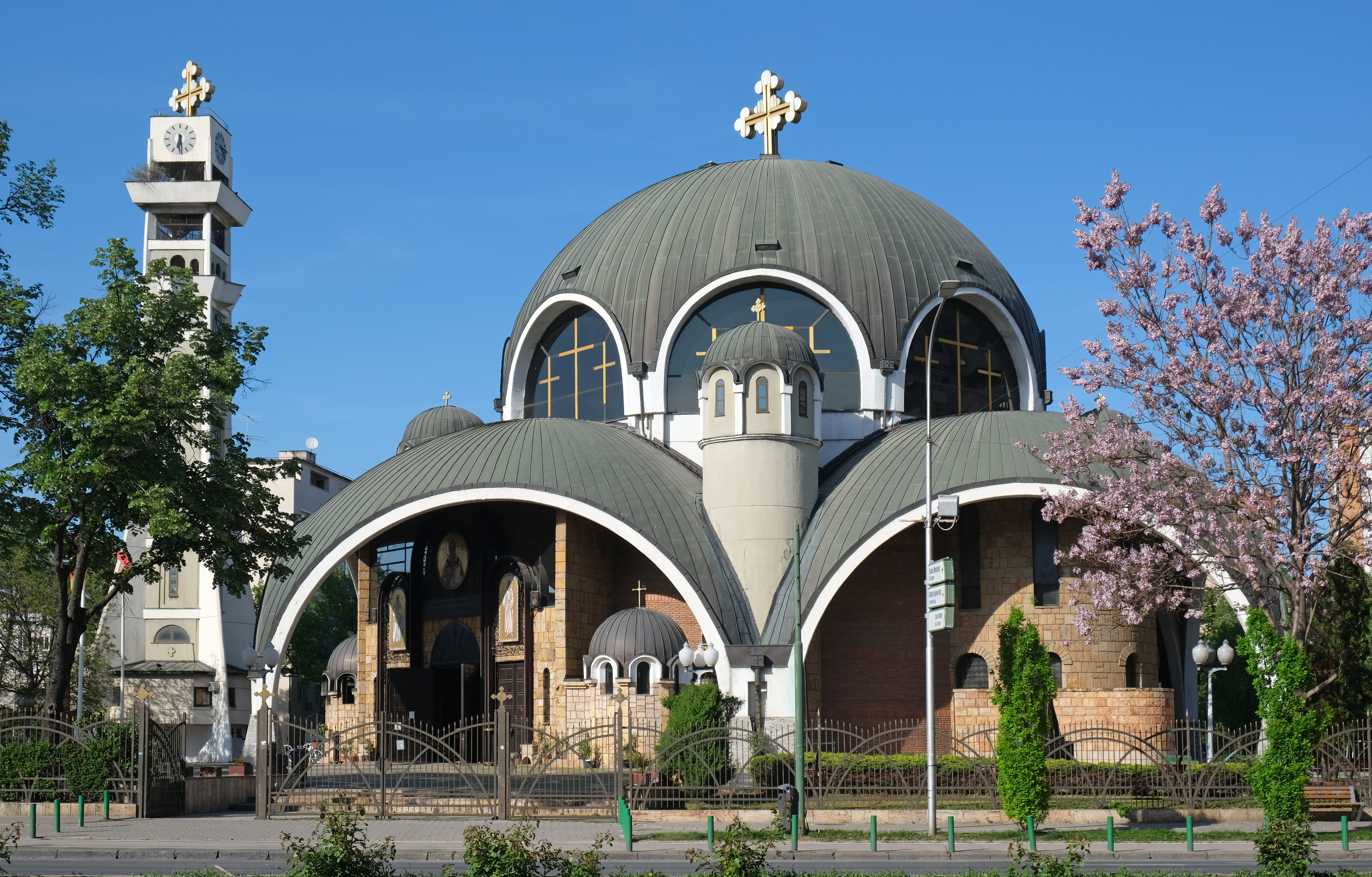

The Church of Saint Clement of Ohrid (Macedonian: Соборна црква – Свети Климент Охридски, romanized: Soborna crkva – Sveti Kliment Ohridski), often called simply the Soborna Crkva (Соборна црква), is a cathedral church of the Macedonian Orthodox Church, located in Skopje, North Macedonia. It is the largest cathedral of the Macedonian Orthodox Church.

== Architecture ==
The construction of the cathedral church, designed by Slavko Brezoski, began in 1972 and was consecrated on 12 August 1990, on the 1150th anniversary of the birth of the church patron, St. Clement of Ohrid. This rotunda–type church that is 36 by 36 metres (118 by 118 ft), composed only of domes and arches, is one of the most interesting architectural examples in recent Macedonian history. The main church is dedicated to St. Clement of Ohrid, and the church below to the Holy Mother. One of the chapels is dedicated to Emperor Constantine and Empress Helena, and the other to St. Mina, the martyr. The icons in the iconostasis were painted by Gjorgji Danevski and Spase Spirovski and the frescoes were painted by academic painter Jovan Petrov and his collaborators.

Under the central dome there is a 3.5-metre-high (11 ft) archbishopric throne. The two chairs opposite of it are each 2 metres (6 ft 7 in) high and according to local catechisms, are intended for the ruler of the world and his empress. The Central dome has an area of 650 square metres (7,000 sq ft). The frescoes are works of the academic painter Jovan Petrov and his collaborators. Uniquely, in this church Jesus Christ is painted on 70 square metres (750 sq ft), with each eye having a diameter of 1.5 metres (4 ft 11 in). A departure from tradition is that the Old Testament prophets are depicted as sitting instead of standing. The second departure from tradition are the large windows. To avoid large amounts of light a crystalline acrylic is placed in front of them, creating wondrous rays of color depending on the angle by which the light falls on it. The church is lit by 5 tonnes (5.5 short tons) hard polileum placed under the central dome with approximately 400 bulbs arranged around it. A second polileum, which is in the middle, hangs over the altar in the Holy See.

A 45-metre-high (148 ft) belfry is located in the yard, north from the main entrance. In total, there are three bells in the church, weighing 1,000 kg (2,200 lb), 500 kg (1,100 lb), and 300 kg (660 lb).

The fountain in front of the church was a gift from the Islamic religious community.

== Gallery ==
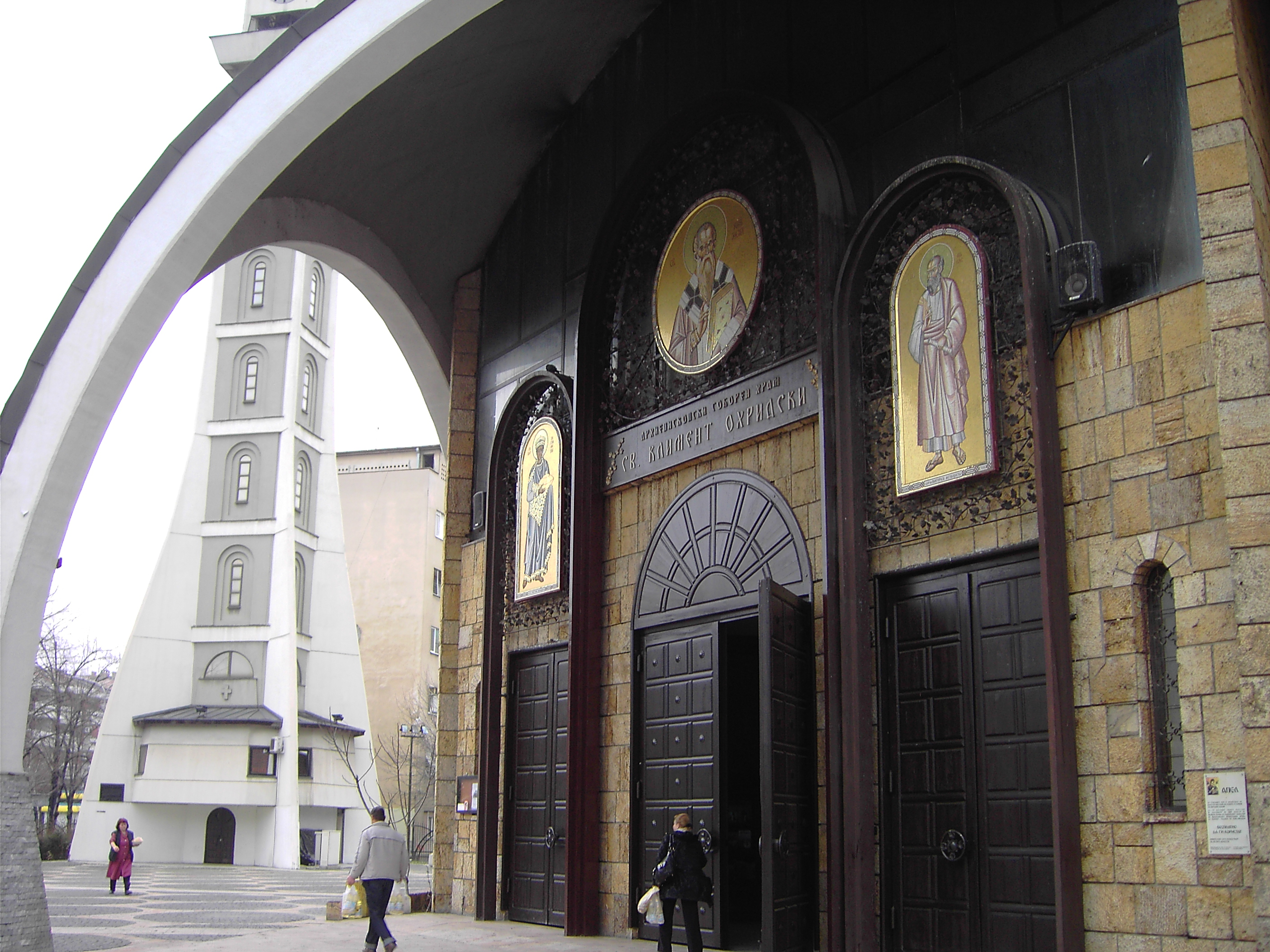
The entrance of the church

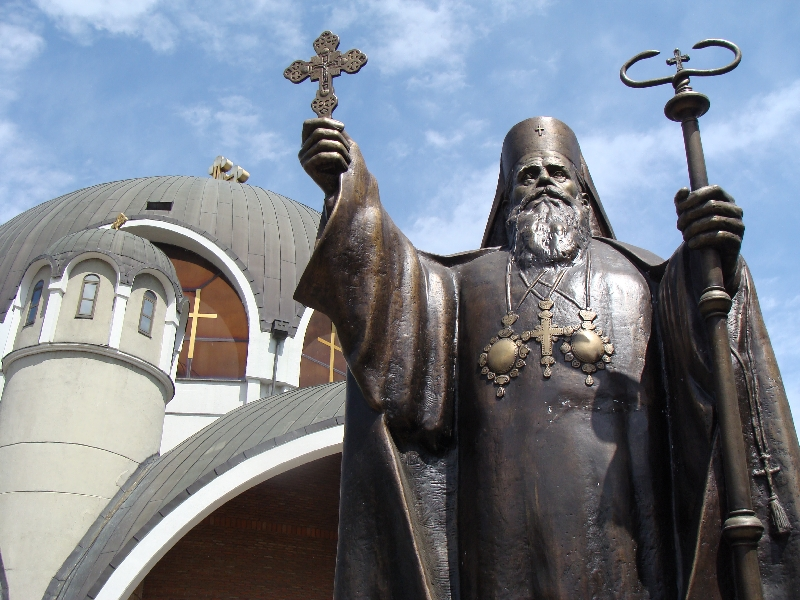
Statue of Dositheus II in front of the church

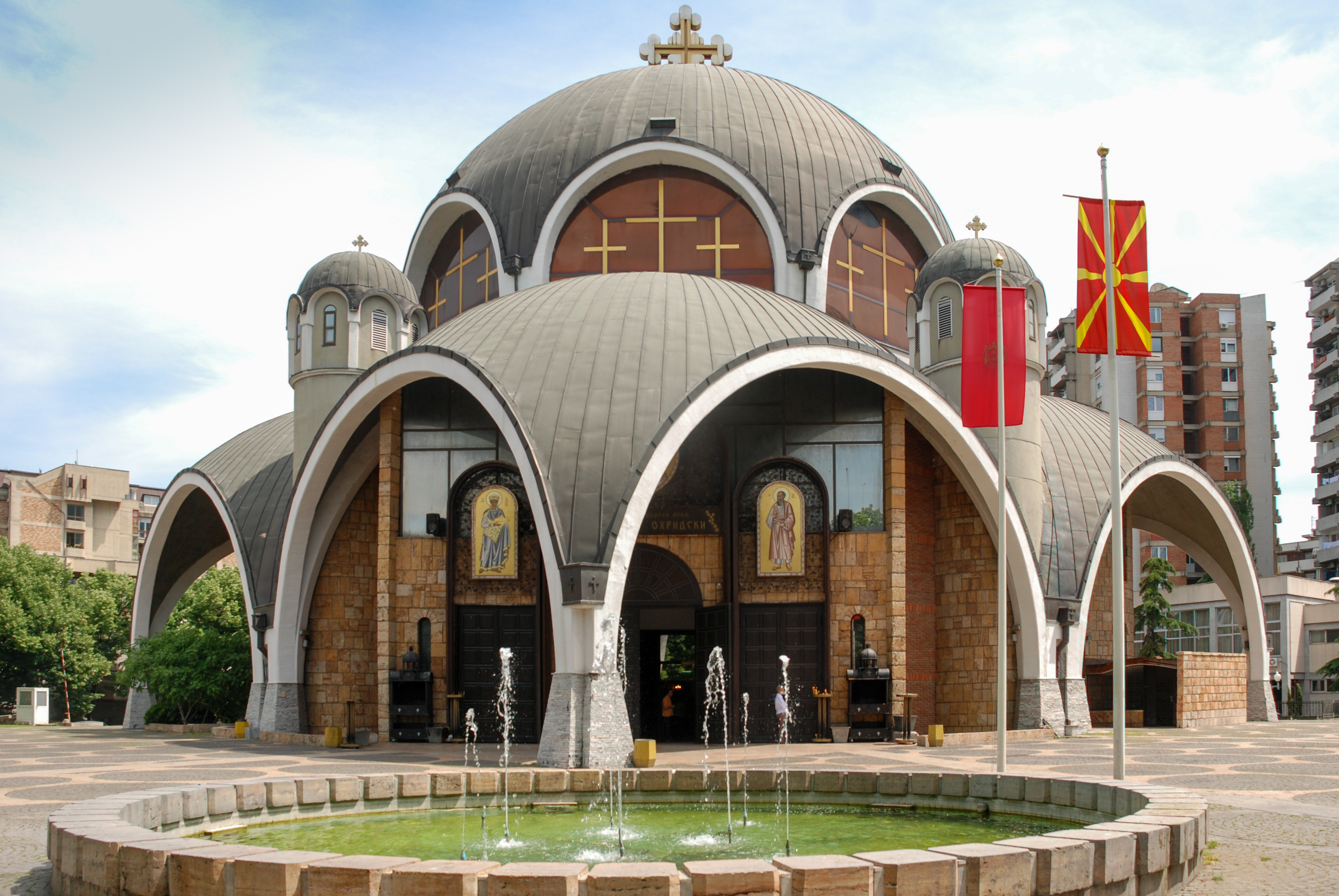
Closer view of the church

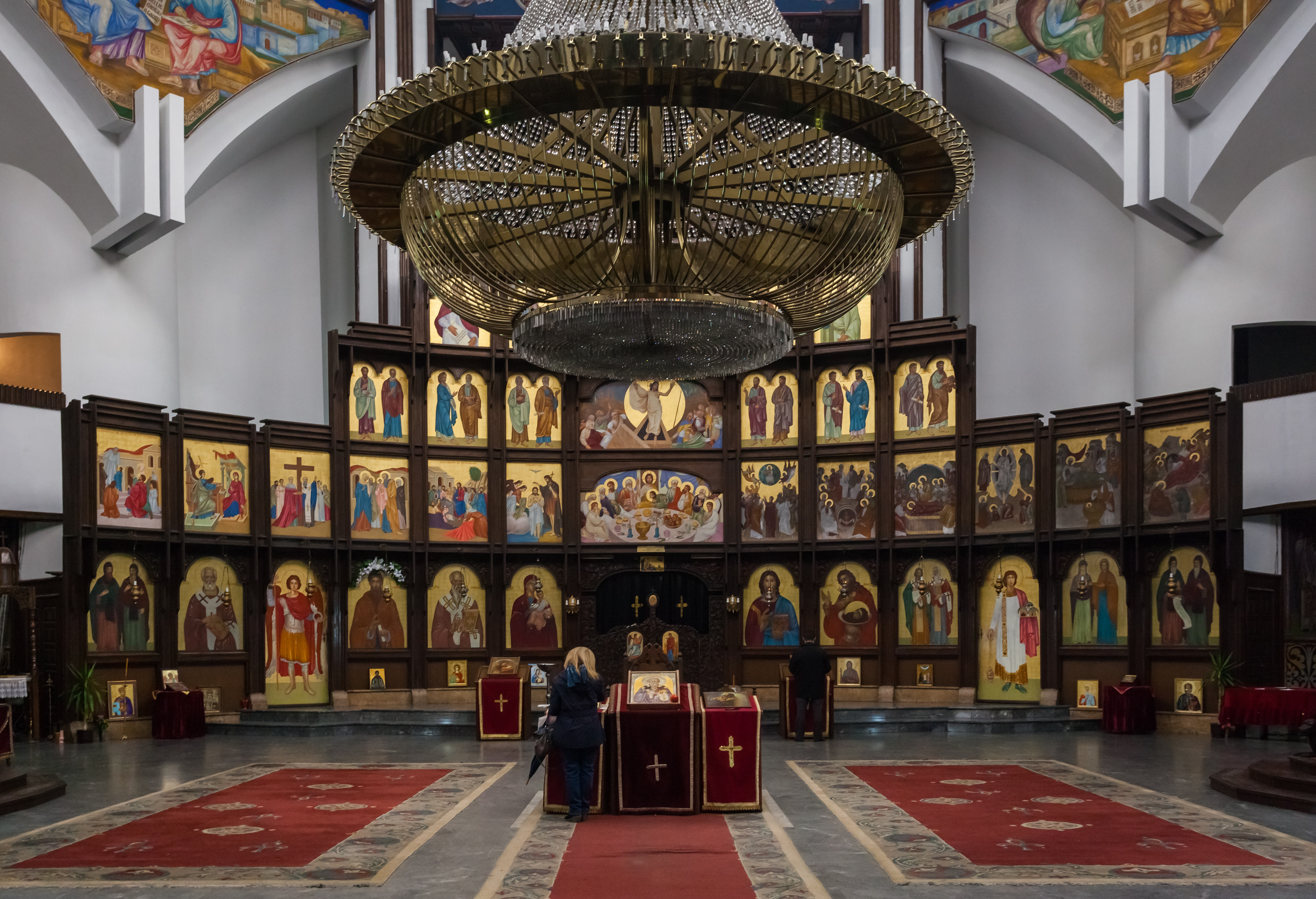
Interior of the church

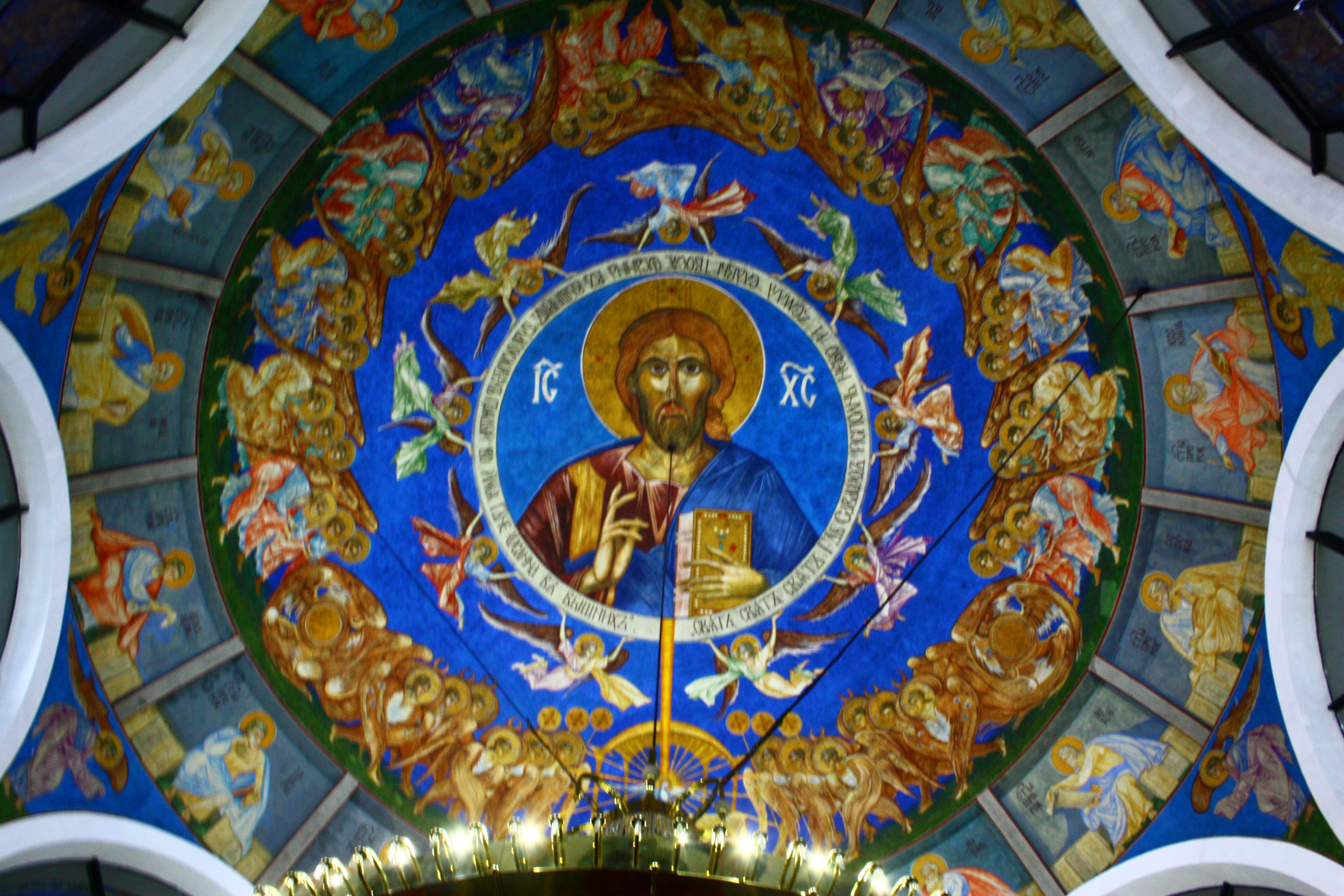
Inside view of central dome

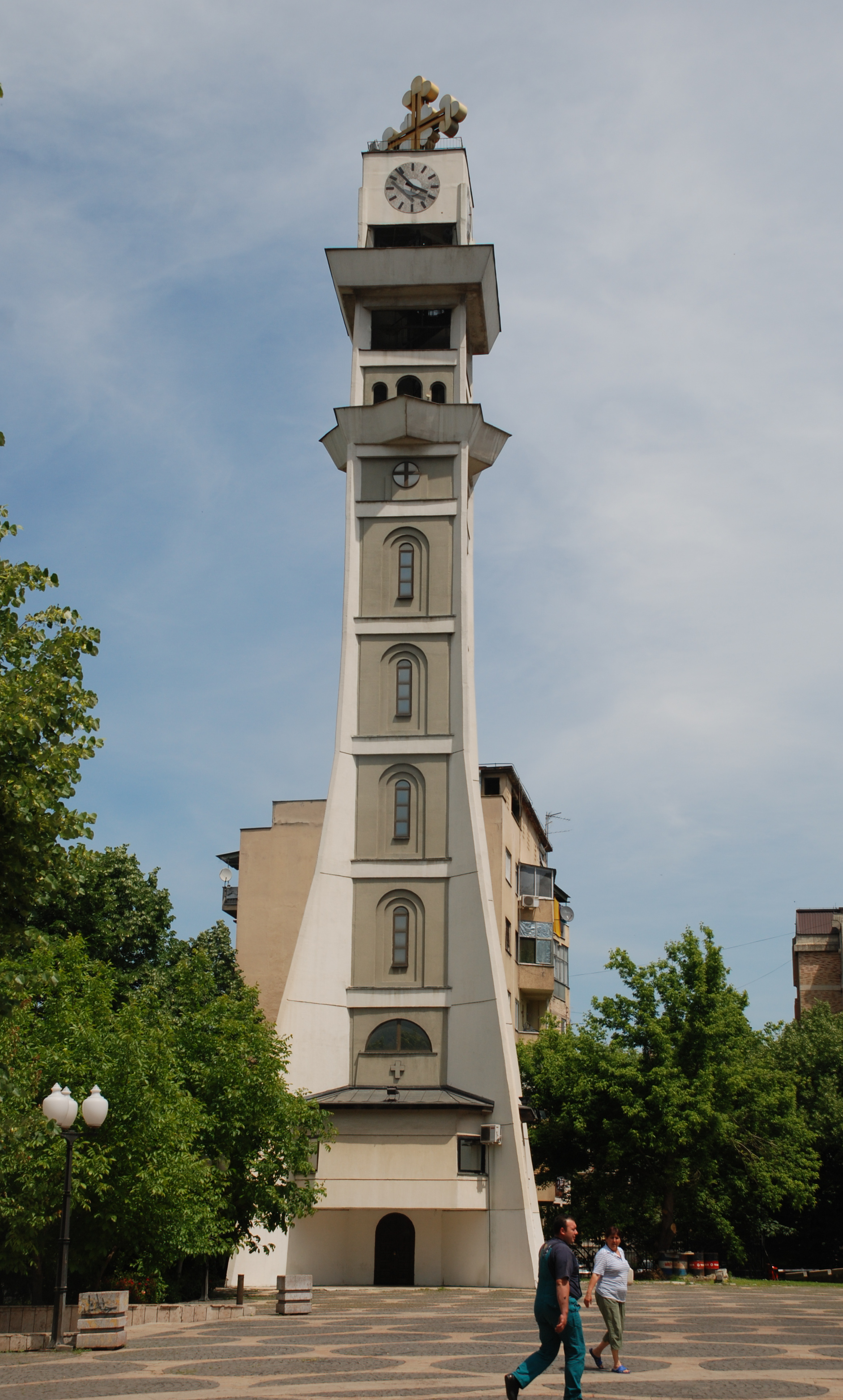
The belfry

== See also ==
- Architecture of North Macedonia
- List of churches in North Macedonia
