= Cerovo mine =

Copper mine in Serbia

- Location: Bor District, Serbia
- Products: Copper

The Cerovo mine is a large copper mine located in the east of Serbia in Bor District. Cerovo represents one of the largest copper reserve in Serbia and in the world having estimated reserves of 325.5 million tonnes of ore grading 0.36% copper.
