= Slepče, Demir Hisar =

Village in North Macedonia

Slepče Слепче
- Village
- Air view of the village

- Location within North Macedonia
- Country: North Macedonia
- Region: Pelagonia
- Municipality: Demir Hisar

Population (2002)
  - Total: 719
- Time zone: UTC+1 (CET)
  - Summer (DST): UTC+2 (CEST)
- Website: .

Slepče (Macedonian: Слепче) is a village in the municipality of Demir Hisar, North Macedonia.

== Location ==
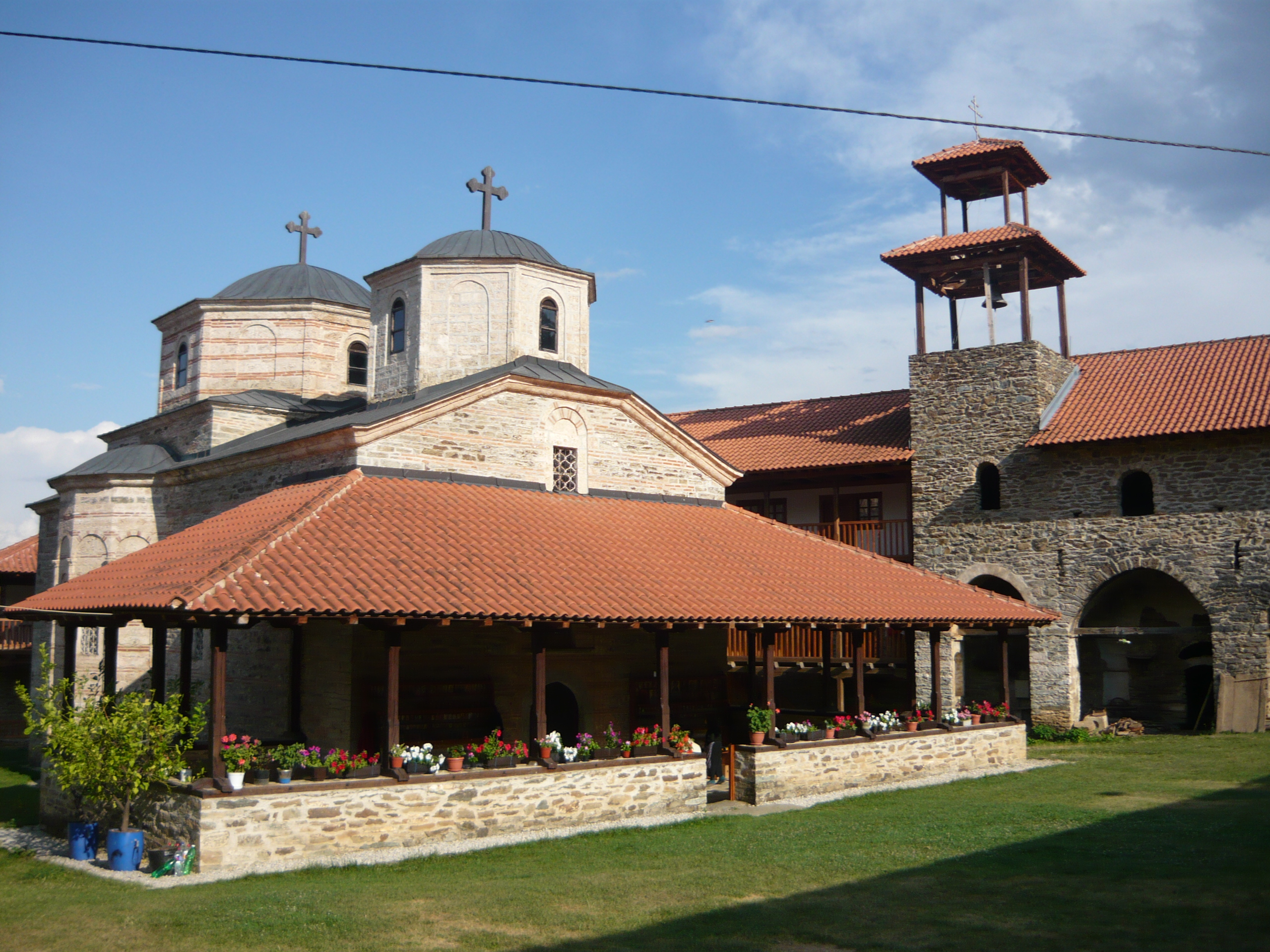
Monastery Sv. Jovan Preteca Slepce

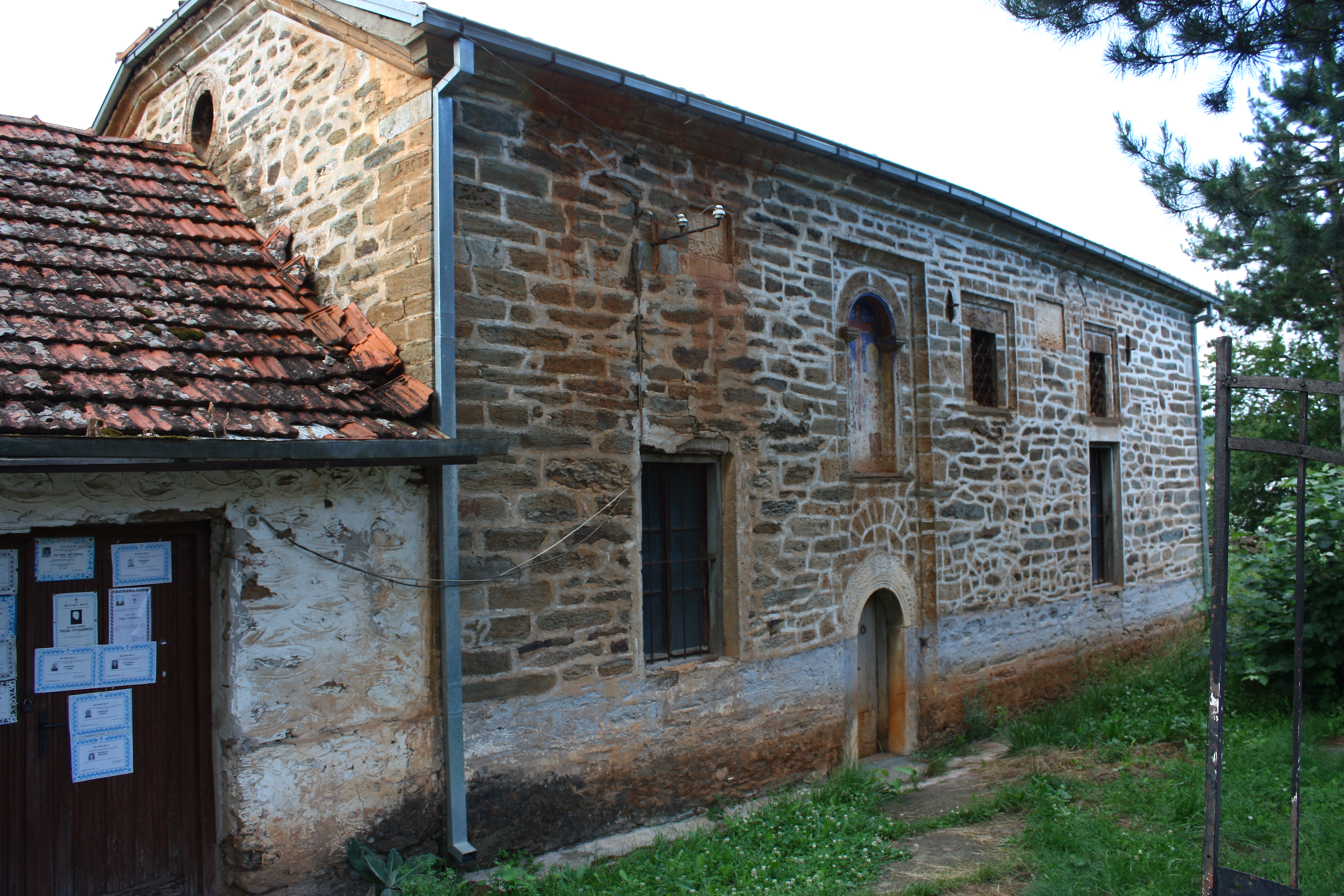
Sv. Konstantin and Elena - Slepče

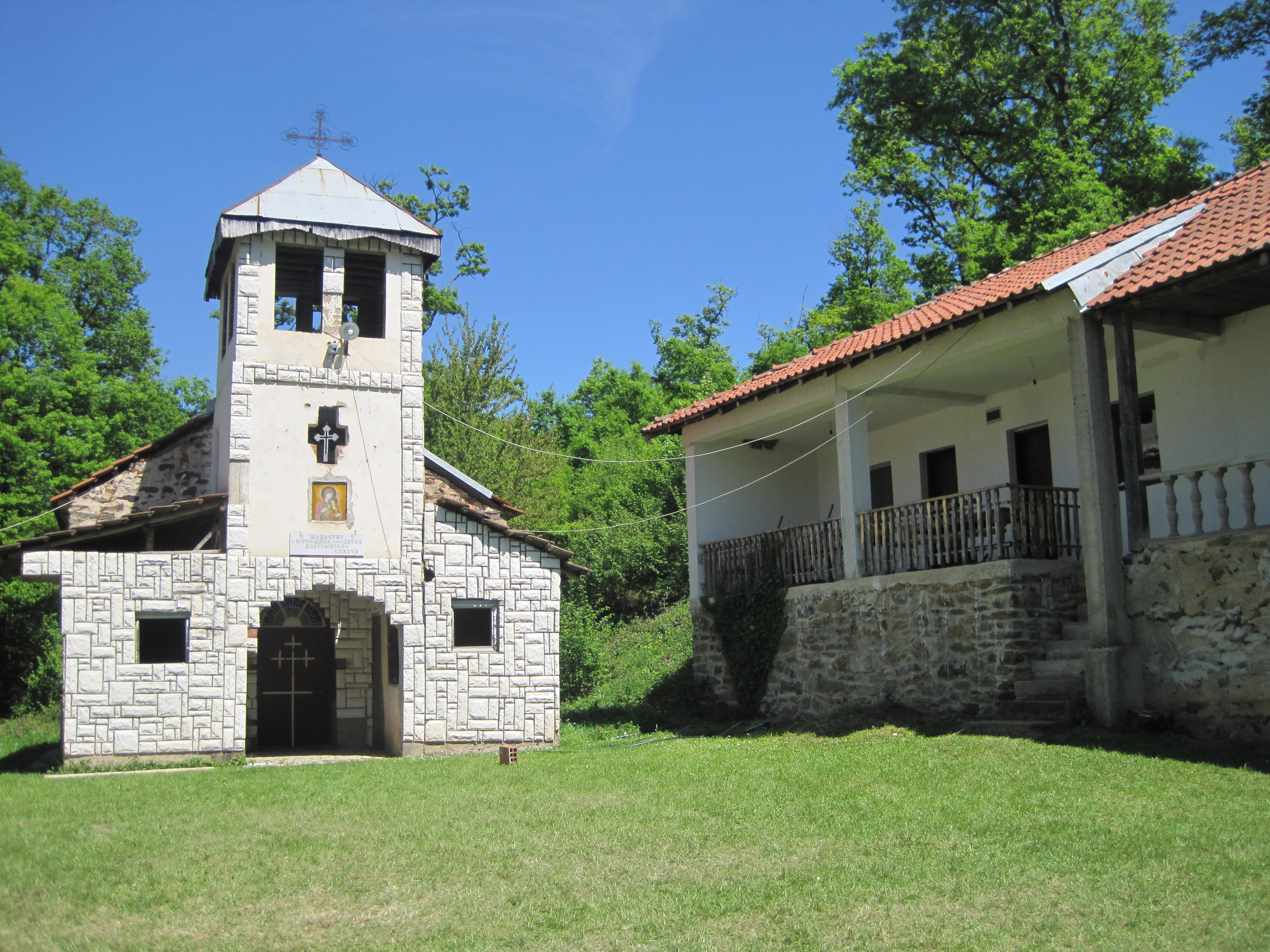
Monastery church "St. Virgin - Eastern Friday

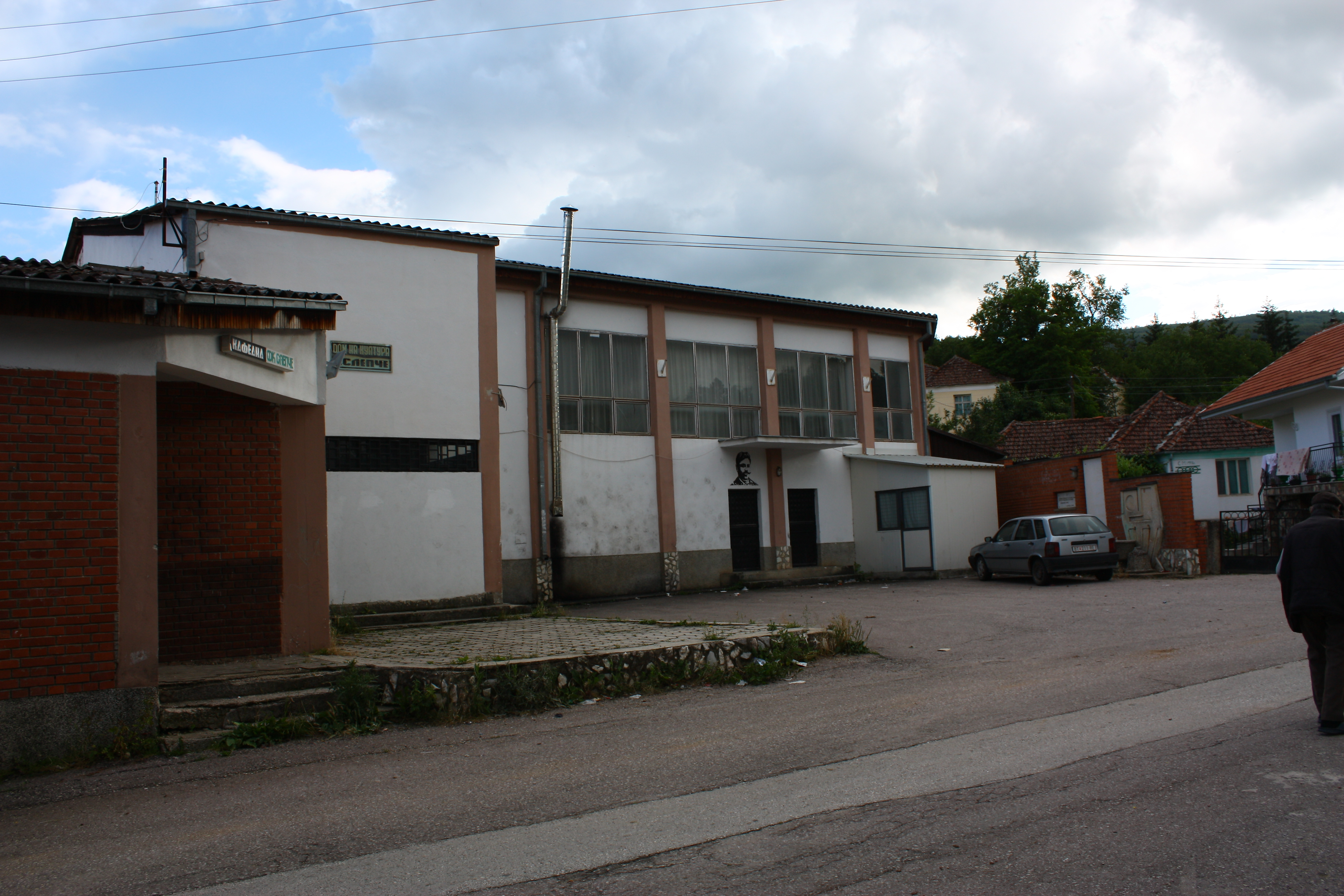
House of Culture in Slepce

Slepče is located near the village of Zheleznik area 2 km west of the town of Demir Hisar and to the right is the road Kicevo-Demir Hisar 680 m. It is located on the eastern slopes of Ilinica. The land of Slepče is 24.5 km², of which forests occupy an area of 1737 ha or most of the land, arable land occupies 365 ha and pastures 367 ha.

== Demographics ==
in the 1467/1468 Ottoman defter, the village had 66 households, 3 bachelors and 2 widows. The onomastics consisted entirely of Christian Slavic anthroponyms. In statistics gathered by Vasil Kanchov in 1900, the village of Slepče was inhabited by 570 Christian Bulgarians.

According to the 2002 census, the village had a total of 719 inhabitants. Ethnic groups in the village include:

- Macedonians 718
- Serbs 1

== Economy ==
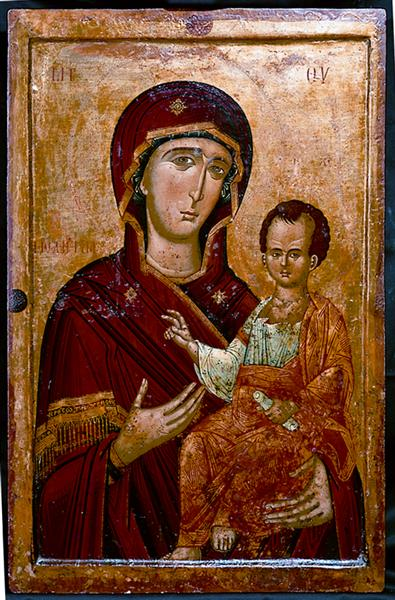
Icon of Mother of God, 16th century

In March, 2013 in the building of the House of Culture, the Russian ballet producer Grishko has opened a working facility with a capacity of 60 employees. Grishko produces shoes for all dance styles, theatrical costumes, fitness clothing, yoga and other leisure activities, and products are available in over 60 countries on many continents.

== Social institutions ==
- Goce Delchev Elementary school until V grade, satellite school of the Goce Delchev elementary school - Demir Hisar

The village has a cultural home and a memorial to those killed for freedom in Macedonia. Above the village lies one of the largest medieval literary and artistic centers – the Slepčan Monastery dedicated to St. John the Baptist.

The center has been renovated and furnished, converted into a square called "King Samuel".
