= Cerovo, Želino =

Cerovo Церово Cerovë
- Village
- Location within North Macedonia
- Coordinates: 41°59′32″N 21°08′09″E
- Country: North Macedonia
- Region: Polog
- Municipality: Želino

Population (2021)
  - Total: 368
- Time zone: UTC+1 (CET)
  - Summer (DST): UTC+2 (CEST)
- Car plates: TE
- Website: .

Cerovo (Macedonian: Церово, Albanian: Cerovë) is a village in the municipality of Želino, North Macedonia.

== Demographics ==
As of the 2021 census, Cerovo had 368 residents with the following ethnic composition:

- Albanians 327
- Persons for whom data are taken from administrative sources 41

According to the 2002 census, the village had a total of 511 inhabitants. Ethnic groups in the village include:

- Albanians 510
- Macedonians 1
