= House of Iljo and Strezo Cubalevski =

- Куќа на Иљо и Стрезо Цубалевски; Kukja na Iljo and Strezo Cubalevski (Macedonian)
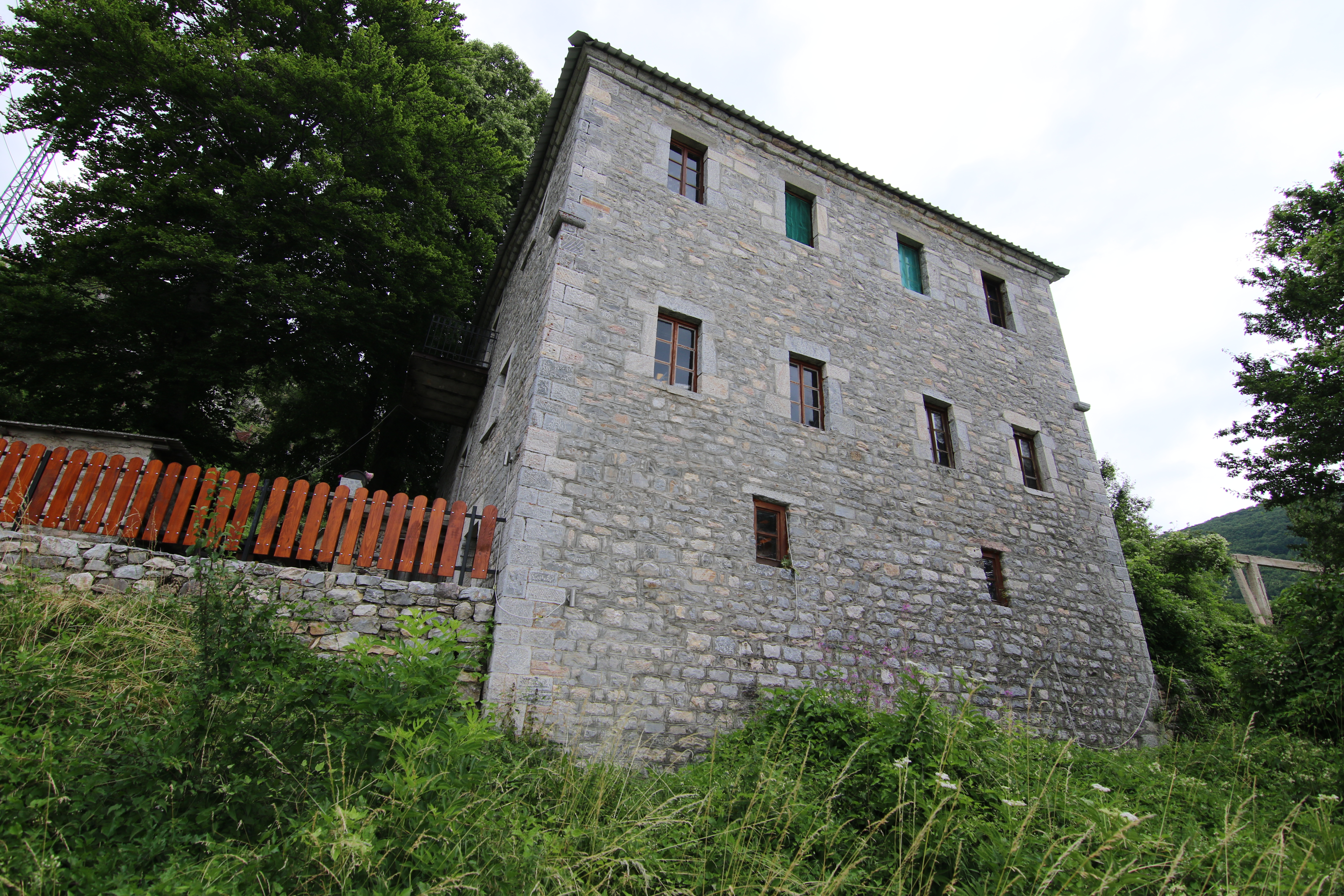
- Interactive map of House of Iljo and Strezo Cubalevski
- 41°35′34.61″N 20°39′11.11″E
- Type: House
- Location: Galičnik, North Macedonia

Site notes
- Governing body: Office for Protection of Cultural Heritage, Ministry of Culture
- Owner: Cubalevski family

The House of Iljo and Strezo Cubalevski is a historical house in Galičnik that is listed as Cultural heritage of North Macedonia. It is in ownership of one branch of the family of Cubalevski.

== Family history ==
The Cubalevski/Cubalevci trace roots from the Kolačevci family which originates from Albania. It is said that Kolačevci moved out from Albania after the fall of Gjerg Kastrioti.

=== Notable members of the family ===
- Kuze Cubaleski - 19th century local teacher (daskal).
- Strezo Cubaleski - local sports activist.
- Mitre Cubaleski - local sports activist.
