= House of Dokse Lonovski =

- Куќа на Доксе Лоновски; Kukja na Dokse Lonovski (Macedonian)
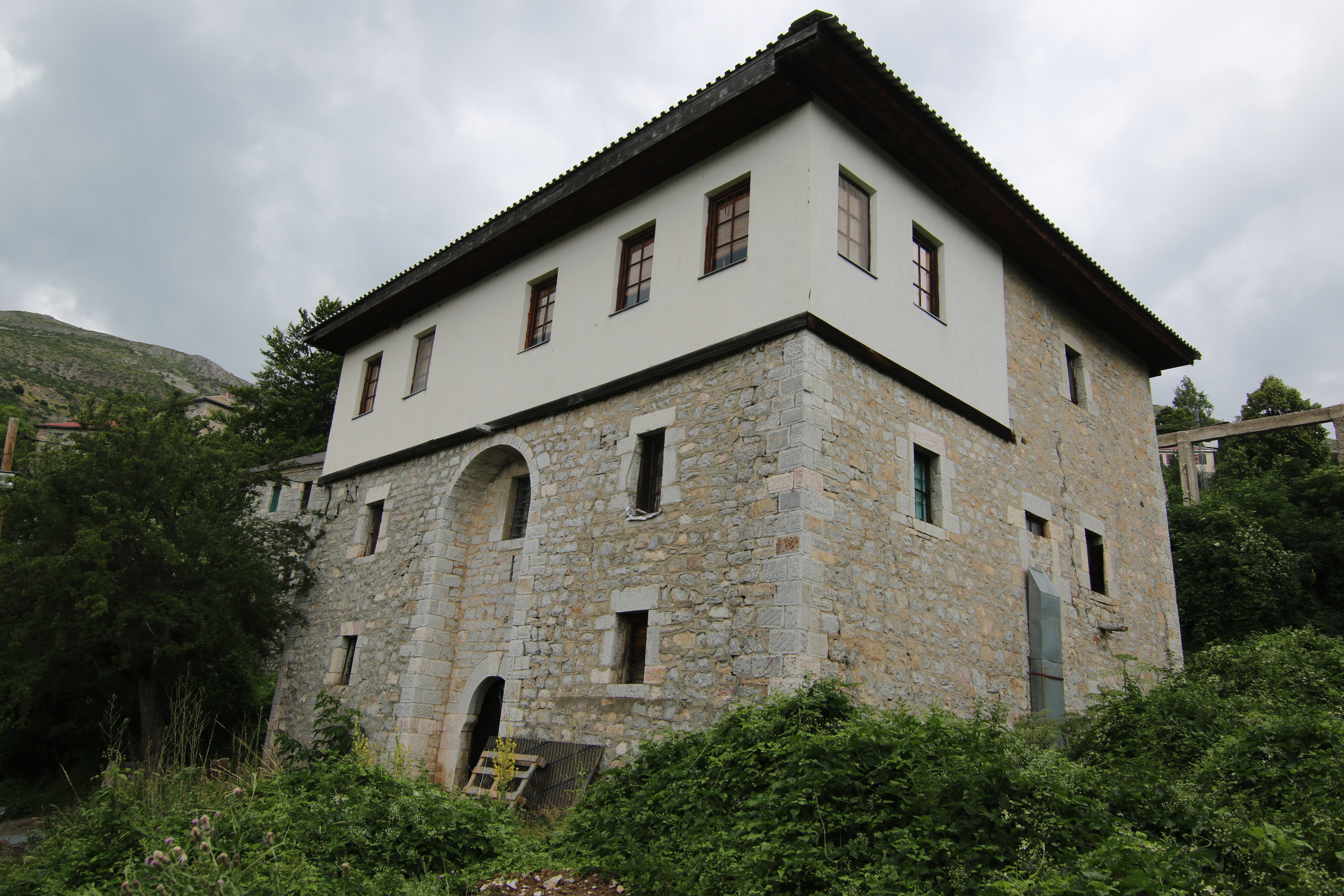
- Interactive map of House of Dokse Lonovski
- 41°35′33.71″N 20°39′11.58″E
- Type: House
- Location: Galičnik, North Macedonia

Site notes
- Governing body: Office for Protection of Cultural Heritage, Ministry of Culture
- Owner: Lonovski family

The House of Dokse Lonovski is a historical house in Galičnik that is listed as cultural heritage of North Macedonia. It is in ownership of one branch of the family of Lonovski.

== Family history ==
The Lonovski family has its roots from the Duruzovci/Duruzovski family. There are two theories of the background of the Doruzovci: the first one is that they originated from the city of Durrës (modern day Albania) and the second being that Ilija's (one of the progenitors) grand father got the nickname Duruz that has a Turkish origin. The later surname of the family was Mangarovci.

=== Members of the family ===
- Tomo Ognenov Duruzoski ― son of Ognen.
- Rista Ognjanovikj Lonovski - titular professor and director of the Teachers School in Skopje. Author of the book Galičnik and the Myaks, written in 1939–40, which was published posthumously. Born on March 1, 1870. Son of father Ognjan and mother Sofija. He finished elementary school in his home place Galičnik. The first three years of high school, he went to the Bulgarian Men's High School in Thessalonica. After refusing to be sent as a teacher in his home town area after the eventual graduation, he continued his education in Serbia. In 1890, he graduated to become a teacher. After an unsuccessful mission to open a Serbian language school in the Manastir (Bitola) Vilayet, he went to study to Constantinople in the Galatasaray High School. In 1892, he started to teach in the newly open Serbian language elementary school, based in the Ottoman capital, teaching French language. After the abolition of this school, he was transferred to Skopje to teach French. In 1936, he was informed that he would receive the medal "Officer of the Academy" by France, for spreading the French language. He received the medal on June 14 (the National Day of France), 1937, in person by the French Consulate from Skopje, given in his residence in the village of Mavrovo.
- Dokse Lonovski - local activist in the mid 20th century.
