= List of Serbs of North Macedonia =

This is a list of notable people who are Serbs or of Serbian descent, from present-day North Macedonia.

== Arts ==
- Petar Popović, architect
- Jovan the Serb of Kratovo, calligraphist
- Mladen Srbinović, painter
- Dragomir Felba, actor
- Ljubomir Ćipranić, actor
- Nataša Petrović, actress
- Isaiah the Serb, composer
- Mara Đorđević, singer
- Dragan Vučić, composer
- Martin Vučić, singer
- Barbara Popović, singer
- Stanislav of Lesnovo, writer
- Kosta Abrašević, poet
- Anđelko Krstić, writer
- Petar Džadžić, literary critic

== Medieval nobility ==
- Branko Mladenović, magnate
- Dejan, nobleman
- Constantine Dragaš, nobleman
- Jovan Dragaš, nobleman
- Grgur Golubić, nobleman
- Vukašin, king
- Prince Marko, prince
- Jovan Oliver, nobleman
- Paskač, nobleman
- Vlatko Paskačić, nobleman
- Ostoja Rajaković, nobleman
- Nikola Stanjević, nobleman

== Military ==
- Jovan Babunski, Chetnik guerrilla fighter
- Gligor Sokolović, Chetnik guerrilla fighter
- Micko Krstić, Chetnik guerrilla fighter
- Ditko Aleksić, Chetnik guerrilla fighter
- Đorđe Cvetković, Chetnik guerrilla fighter
- Rista Cvetković-Božinče, Chetnik guerrilla fighter
- Jovan Dolgač, Chetnik guerrilla fighter
- Jovan Dovezenski, Chetnik guerrilla fighter
- Petko Ilić, Chetnik guerrilla fighter
- Petar Kacarević, Chetnik guerrilla fighter
- Cincar-Marko Kostić, voivode in the First Serbian Uprising
- Todor Krstić-Algunjski, Chetnik guerrilla fighter
- Vera Jocić, Yugoslav Partisan
- Cene Marković, Chetnik guerrilla fighter
- Doksim Mihailović, Chetnik guerrilla fighter
- Pavle Mladenović, Chetnik guerrilla fighter
- Stevan Nedić-Ćela, Chetnik guerrilla fighter
- Spasa Garda, Chetnik guerrilla fighter
- Cincar-Janko Popović, voivode in the First Serbian Uprising
- Zafir Premčević, Chetnik guerrilla fighter
- Trenko Rujanović, Chetnik guerrilla fighter
- Milivoje Trbić, Chetnik guerrilla fighter (in World War II)
- Boško Virjanac, Chetnik guerrilla fighter
- Vuča Žikić, notable figure in the First Serbian Uprising

== Politics ==
- Petar Čardaklija, diplomat
- Vasa Jovanović, founder of the Chetnik movement
- Josif Mihailović Jurukovski, mayor of Skopje
- Ilija Šumenković, politician
- Ivan Stoilković, politician

== Religion ==
- Mihailo Bojčić, metropolitan of Kratovo
- Maksim I, Serbian Patriarch
- Jefrem Janković Tetovac, Orthodox bishop
- Atanasije, Serbian Patriarch
- Hadži-Zaharija, Metropolitan of Raška and Prizren
- Dositej Novaković, Orthodox bishop
- Dimitrije Mladenović, Protoiereus of the Ecumenical Patriarchate of Constantinople

== Science ==
- Stevan Simić, geographer
- Toma Smiljanić-Bradina, ethnographer and writer
- Jovan Trifunoski, geographer and anthropologist
- Traian Stoianovich, historian
- Dragoslav Avramović, economist
- Aleksandar Mladenović, linguist
- Ljubomir Maksimović, historian
- Milan Damnjanović, physicist
- Vladimir Kanjuh, cardiovascular pathologist

== Sports ==
- Saša Ćirić, football player
- Miroslav Đokić, football player
- Darko Glišić, football player
- Saša Ilić, football player
- Milovan Petrović, football player
- Kuzman Sotirović, football player
- Vujadin Stanojković, football player
- Blagoje Vidinić, football player
- Nenad Dimitrijević, basketball player
- Marko Dujković, basketball player
- Stevan Gligorijević, basketball player
- Budimir Jolović, basketball player
- Emil Rajković, basketball player and coach
- Mirjana Čupić, handball player
- Dragica Kresoja, handball player
- Vesna Milošević, handball player
- Mihajlo Mladenović, handball player
- Nemanja Pribak, handball player
- Divna Pešić, sports shooter
- Nikola Đuretanović, swimmer
- Miljana Reljić, taekwondo

== Other ==
- Dimitrije Pepić, merchant and philanthropist
- Denko Krstić, merchant and philanthropist
- Golub Janić, merchant and philanthropist
- Despot Badžović, teacher and activist
- Vanja Bulić, journalist
- Dragan Pavlović Latas, journalist

== See also ==
- List of Serbs
- List of Serbs of Bosnia and Herzegovina
- List of Serbs of Croatia
- List of Serbs of Montenegro

== Sources ==
- Hadži-Vasiljević, Jovan (1928). Četnička akcija u Staroj Srbiji i Maćedoniji (in Serbian). Belgrade: Sv. Sava.
