= Konjuh =

Konjuh may refer to:

Places

- Konjuh (mountain), a mountain of Bosnia and Herzegovina
- Konjuh, Kratovo Municipality, North Macedonia
- Konjuh (Kruševac), a village in Serbia

People with the surname

- Ana Konjuh (born 1997), Croatian tennis player
