= List of Serbs of Bosnia and Herzegovina =

This is the list of notable Serbs of Bosnia and Herzegovina.

== Arts and entertainment ==
- Nedeljko Bajić Baja, singer
- Miloš Bajić, painter
- Maya Berović, singer
- Jovan Bijelić, painter
- Isidora Bjelica, writer
- Miloš Bojanić, singer
- Miroslav Čangalović, tenor
- Vladimir Savčić Čobi, singer
- Zdravko Čolić, singer
- Branko Ćopić, writer
- Svetozar Ćorović, novelist
- Jovan Deretić, literary historian
- Boro Drašković, director
- Boro Drljača, singer
- Jovan Dučić, poet and writer
- Branko Đurić, actor
- Nebojša Glogovac, actor
- Predrag Golubović, director and screenwriter
- Nedeljko Gvozdenović, painter
- Momo Kapor, painter and novelist
- Nele Karajlić, actor and musician
- Mile Kitić, singer
- Baja Mali Knindža, singer
- Petar Kočić, writer
- Emir Kusturica, director
- Dragan Marinković Maca, actor and media personality
- Veselin Masleša, writer
- Dejan Matić, singer
- Saša Matić, singer
- Mitar Mirić, singer
- Nataša Ninković, actress
- Rajko Petrov Nogo, poet
- Romana Panić, singer
- Nikola Pejaković, actor
- Branko Pleša, actor
- Ljubomir Popović, painter
- Vlado Pravdić, organist
- Indira Radić, singer
- Marinko Rokvić, singer
- Željko Samardžić, singer
- Sima Milutinović Sarajlija, poet
- Meša Selimović, writer
- Branka Sovrlić, singer
- Tihomir Stanić, actor
- Boro Stjepanović, actor
- Jadranka Stojaković, singer
- Sreten Stojanović, sculptor
- Minja Subota, composer
- Jovan Sundečić, poet and priest
- Aleksa Šantić, poet
- Dušan Šestić, composer
- Zdravko Šotra, director and screenwriter
- Todor Švrakić, painter
- Predrag Tasovac, actor
- Mladen Vojičić Tifa, singer
- Duško Trifunović, poet and writer
- Filip Višnjić, epic poet
- Nataša Vojnović, fashion model
- Božo Vrećo, singer
- Rista Vukanović, painter
- Milić Vukašinović, musician
- Pero Zubac, poet and writer

== Medieval nobility ==
- Miroslav of Hum, duke
- Sokollu Mehmed Pasha, Ottoman Grand Vizier

== Military ==
- Golub Babić, rebel leader
- Petar Baćović, Chetnik commander
- Jezdimir Dangić, Chetnik commander
- Dobrosav Jevđević, Chetnik commander
- Mićo Ljubibratić, rebel leader
- Omar Pasha, Ottoman general
- Pecija, rebel leader
- Slobodan Princip, Yugoslav Partisan commander
- Vladimir Perić Valter, Yugoslav Partisan Commander
- Bogdan Zimonjić, rebel leader

== Politics ==
- Pero Bukejlović, Prime Minister of Republika Srpska
- Željka Cvijanović, President of Republika Srpska and Prime Minister of Republika Srpska
- Dragan Čavić, President of Republika Srpska
- Rodoljub Čolaković, President of the Executive Council of SR Bosnia and Herzegovina
- Nedeljko Čubrilović, Speaker of the National Assembly of Republika Srpska
- Milorad Dodik, member of the Presidency of Bosnia and Herzegovina, President and Prime Minister of Republika Srpska
- Ratomir Dugonjić, President of the Presidency of SR Bosnia and Herzegovina
- Aleksandar Džombić, Prime Minister of Republika Srpska
- Mladen Ivanić, member of the Presidency of Bosnia and Herzegovina and Prime Minister of Republika Srpska
- Branislav Ivković, Minister of Urban Development and Housing/Science and Technology of Serbia
- Milan Jelić, President of Republika Srpska
- Vojislav Kecmanović, President of the People's Assembly of SR Bosnia and Herzegovina
- Momčilo Krajišnik, member of the Presidency of Bosnia and Herzegovina
- Nela Kuburović, Minister of Justice of Serbia
- Rajko Kuzmanović, President of Republika Srpska
- Jovan Marinović, Prime Minister of Serbia
- Zorana Mihajlović, Deputy Prime Minister of Serbia, Minister of Energy and Mining/Construction, Transport and Infrastructure of Serbia
- Cvijetin Mijatović, President of the Presidency of SFR Yugoslavia
- Dunja Mijatović, Council of Europe Commissioner for Human Rights
- Dragan Mikerević, member of the Presidency of Bosnia and Herzegovina and Prime Minister of Republika Srpska
- Tatjana Ljujić-Mijatović, member of the Presidency of Bosnia and Herzegovina
- Borislav Paravac, member of the Presidency of Bosnia and Herzegovina
- Obrad Piljak, President of the Presidency of SR Bosnia and Herzegovina
- Biljana Plavšić, President of Republika Srpska
- Nikola Poplašen, President of Republika Srpska
- Đuro Pucar, President of the People's Assembly and President of the Executive Council of SR Bosnia and Herzegovina
- Živko Radišić, member of the Presidency of Bosnia and Herzegovina
- Saša Radulović, Minister of Economy of Serbia
- Nebojša Radmanović, member of the Presidency of Bosnia and Herzegovina
- Milanko Renovica, President of the Presidency and President of the Executive Council of SR Bosnia and Herzegovina
- Mirko Šarović, member of the Presidency of Bosnia and Herzegovina, President of Republika Srpska
- Vlado Šegrt, President of the People's Assembly of SR Bosnia and Herzegovina
- Vojislav Šešelj, founder of Serbian Radical Party and Deputy Prime Minister of Serbia
- Nikola Špirić, Chairman of the Council of Minister of Bosnia and Herzegovina
- Zoran Tegeltija, Chairman of the Council of Minister of Bosnia and Herzegovina
- Darija Kisić Tepavčević, Minister of Labour, Employment, Veteran and Social Policy of Serbia
- Spasoje Tuševljak, Chairman of the Council of Minister of Bosnia and Herzegovina
- Slobodan Unković, President of the National Assembly of Serbia
- Radovan Višković, Prime Minister of Republika Srpska

== Religion ==
- Gavrilo II, Serbian Patriarch
- Basil of Ostrog, venerated Orthodox saint
- Savatije Ljubibratić, Metropolitan of Zahumlje and Dalmatia
- Antonije Sokolović, Serbian Patriarch
- Gerasim Sokolović, Serbian Patriarch
- Makarije Sokolović, Serbian Patriarch
- Savatije Sokolović, Serbian Patriarch
- Visarion, Metropolitan of Herzegovina
- Basil of Ostrog, Metropolitan of Dabar-Bosnia

== Science ==
- Milan Budimir, linguist
- Ranko Bugarski, linguist
- Petar Đurković, astronomer
- Milorad Ekmečić, historian
- Vaso Čubrilović, historian
- Vladimir Ćorović, historian
- Rade Mihaljčić, historian
- Sima Milutinović, aircraft constructor
- Dimitrije Mitrinović, philosopher
- Radovan Samardžić, historian
- Milorad Simić, linguist
- Tibor Živković, historian

== Sports ==
- Boško Antić, football player
- Zlatan Arnautović, handball player
- Andrea Arsović, shooter
- Vule Avdalović, basketball player
- Srđan Babić, football player
- Dušan Bajević, football player and coach
- Sergej Barbarez, football player and coach
- Jelena Blagojević, volleyball player
- Mladen Bojinović, handball player
- Dajana Bošković, volleyball player
- Tijana Bošković, volleyball player
- Saša Čađo, basketball player
- Vlado Čapljić, football player
- Sara Ćirković, boxer
- Dražen Dalipagić, baskeetball player
- Predrag Danilović, basketball player
- Radmila Drljača, handball player
- Radoje Đerić, rower
- Olga Đoković, basketball player
- Đorđe Đurić, volleyball player
- Mijat Gaćinović, football player
- Marica Gajić, basketball player
- Milan Galić, football player
- Nebojša Golić, handball player
- Slađana Golić, basketball player
- Nemanja Gordić, basketball player
- Mile Ilić, basketball player
- Luka Jović, football player
- Slobodan Kačar, boxer
- Tadija Kačar, boxer
- Milorad Karalić, handball player
- Momir Kecman, wrestler
- Svetlana Kitić, handball player
- Aleksandar Knežević, handball player
- Jelica Komnenović, basketball player
- Ognjen Koroman, football player
- Mladen Krstajić, football player and coach
- Radomir Kovačević, judoka
- Aleksandar Kukolj, judoka
- Zdravko Kuzmanović, football player
- Ognjen Kuzmić, basketball player
- Jelena Lolović, alpine skier
- Nemanja Majdov, judoka
- Dobrivoje Marković, handball player
- Stevan Mićić, wrestler
- Brankica Mihajlović, volleyball player
- Nikolina Milić, basketball player
- Savo Milošević, football player
- Zvjezdan Misimović, football player
- Draženko Mitrović, paralympic athlete
- Milan Muškatirović, water polo player
- Aleksandar Nikolić, basketball coach
- Aleksandar Okolić, volleyball player
- Srećko Pejović, sports shooter
- Andrea Petković, tennis player
- Dragan Perić, track and field athlete
- Ljupko Petrović, football player and coach
- Veselin Petrović, basketball player
- Nebojša Popović, handball player
- Zoran Prerad, taekwondo player
- Lana Pudar, swimmer
- Vladimir Radmanović, basketball player
- Ratko Radovanović, basketball player
- Vesna Radović, handball player
- Zdravko Rađenović, handball player
- Zoran Savić, basketball player
- Velimir Sombolac, football player
- Branko Stanković, football player and coach
- Dragana Stanković, basketball player
- Saša Starović, volleyball player
- Velimir Stjepanović, swimmer
- Neven Subotić, football player
- Danijel Šarić, handball player
- Miloš Šestić, football player
- Edin Škorić, volleyball player
- Ratko Varda, basketball player
- Milenko Zorić, canoer

== Other ==
- Luka Ćelović, philanthropist
- Gavrilo Princip, assassin
- Sava Vladislavich, diplomat

== See also ==
- List of Serbs
- List of Serbs of Croatia
- List of Serbs of Montenegro
- List of Serbs of North Macedonia
