= Vakuf =

Vakuf may refer to:

- Spelling for Waqf in southeastern Europe

Bosnia and Herzegovina

- Gornji Vakuf
- Donji Vakuf
- Kulen Vakuf
- Vakuf (Gradiška)

North Macedonia

- Vakuf, Kratovo Municipality
