= Živalevo =

Živalevo Живалево
- Village
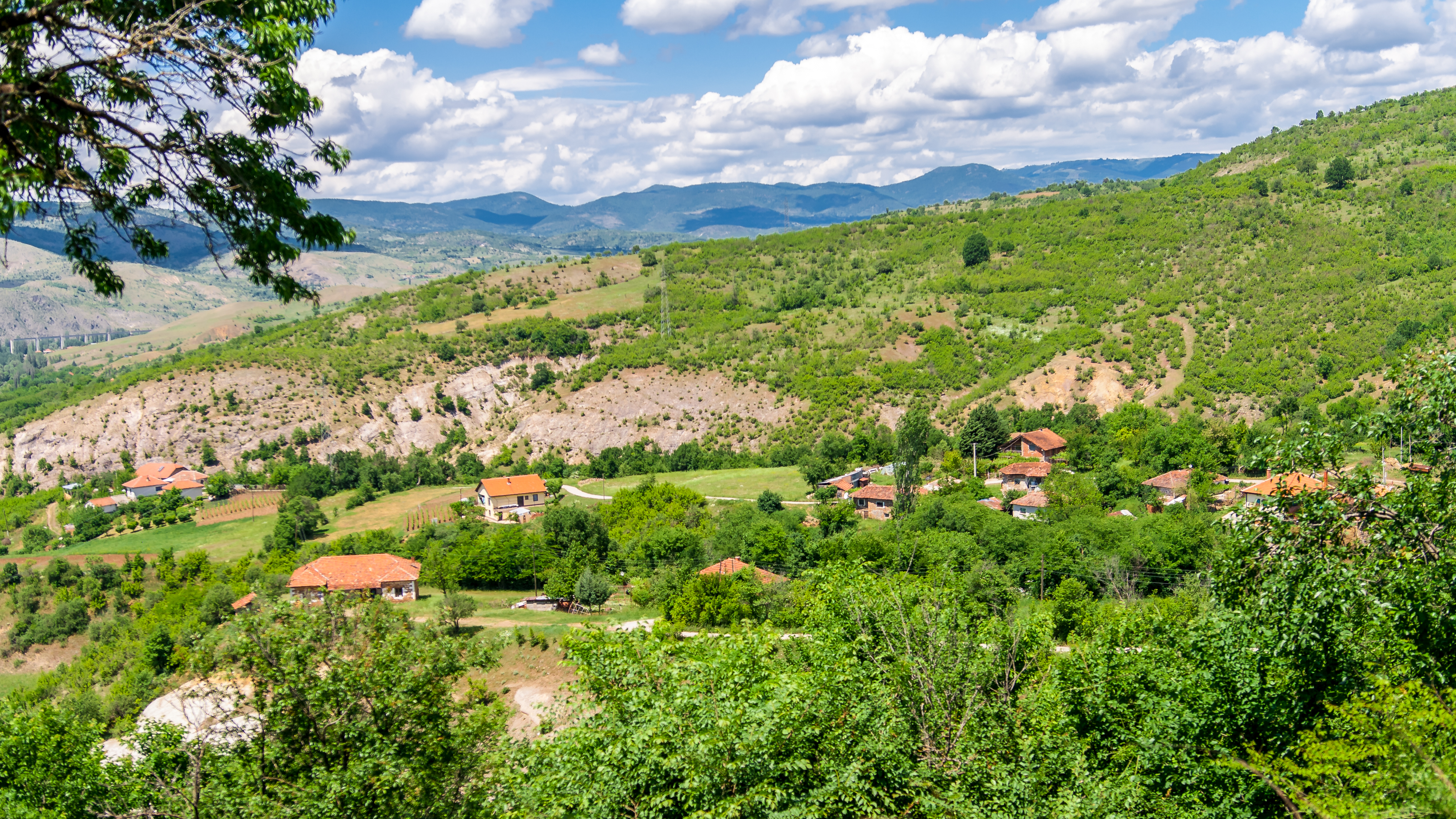

- Location within North Macedonia
- Coordinates: 42.091504°N 22.112922°E
- Country: North Macedonia
- Region: Northeastern
- Municipality: Kratovo

Population (2002)
  - Total: 155
- Time zone: UTC+1 (CET)
  - Summer (DST): UTC+2 (CEST)
- Website: .

Živalevo (Macedonian: Живалево) is a village in the municipality of Kratovo, North Macedonia, located on the Kratovska Reka river.

== Demographics ==
According to the 2002 census, the village had a total of 155 inhabitants, all of which were ethnic Macedonians.
