= Filipovci =

Filipovci Филиповци
- Village
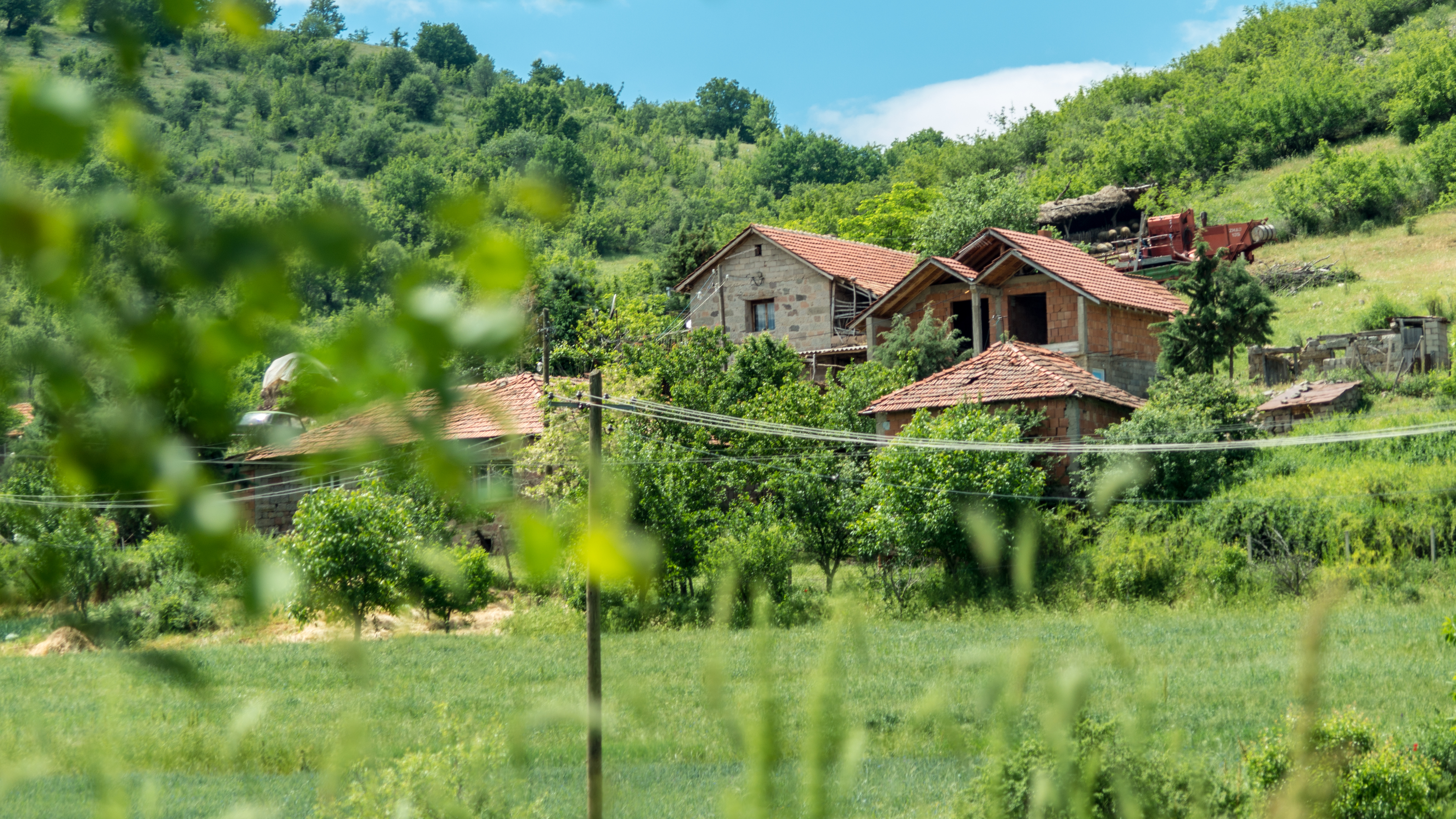

- Location within North Macedonia
- Coordinates: 42.053019°N 22.082527°E
- Country: North Macedonia
- Region: Northeastern
- Municipality: Kratovo

Population (2002)
  - Total: 112
- Time zone: UTC+1 (CET)
  - Summer (DST): UTC+2 (CEST)
- Website: .

Filipovci (Macedonian: Филиповци) is a village in the municipality of Kratovo, North Macedonia.

== Demographics ==
According to the 2002 census, the village had a total of 112 inhabitants, all of which are ethnic Macedonians.
