= Talašmance =

Talašmance Талашманце
- Village
- Location within North Macedonia
- Coordinates: 42.106308°N 22.118032°E
- Country: North Macedonia
- Region: Northeastern
- Municipality: Kratovo

Population (2002)
  - Total: 150
- Time zone: UTC+1 (CET)
  - Summer (DST): UTC+2 (CEST)
- Website: .

Talašmance (Macedonian: Талашманце) is a village in the municipality of Kratovo, North Macedonia.

== Demographics ==
According to the 2002 census, the village had a total of 150 inhabitants. Ethnic groups in the village include:

- Macedonians 150

== Notable residents ==
- Дончо_Ангелов
