= Kratovo, North Macedonia =

Town in Northeastern, North Macedonia

Kratovo Кратово (Macedonian)
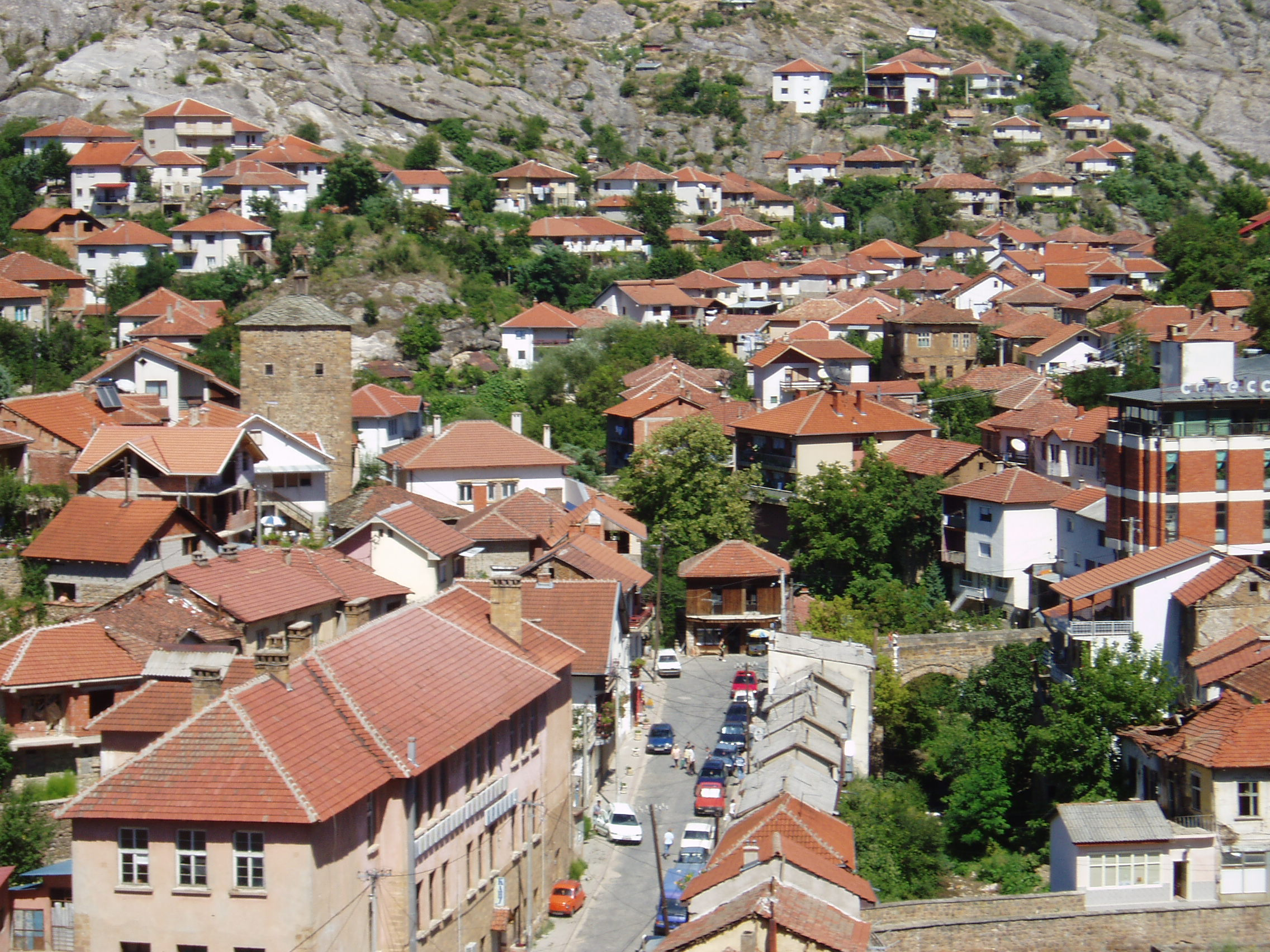
- Kratovo

- Flag Seal

- Location within North Macedonia
- Coordinates: 42°04′N 22°11′E
- Country: North Macedonia
- Region: Northeastern
- Municipality: Kratovo

Government
  - Mayor: Todorche Nikolovski (VMRO-DPMNE)
- Elevation: 600 m (2,000 ft)

Population
  - Total: 6,924
- Time zone: UTC+1 (CET)
  - Summer (DST): UTC+2 (CEST)
- Postal code: 1360
- Area code: +389 031
- Vehicle registration: KR
- Climate: Cfb
- Website: www.kratovo.gov.mk/

Kratovo (Macedonian: Кратово [ˈkratɔvɔ]) is a small town in North Macedonia. It is the seat of Kratovo Municipality. It lies on the western slopes of Mount Osogovo at an altitude of 600 metres (2,000 ft) above sea level. Having a mild and pleasant climate, it is located in the crater of an extinct volcano. It is known for its bridges and towers.

== History ==
=== Early Middle Ages ===
In the Roman period, there was a settlement called Tranatura located within the modern city municipality. There was a mine nearby and the town was the seat of local authorities. No remains of the settlement have been found, however, remnants of Roman fortification were found on Zdravče kamen hill above the town. Byzantine and Bulgarian Empires ruled the area subsequently.

=== Late Middle Ages ===
In 1282 Kratovo became part of the Kingdom of Serbia. In all probability the wealth of the town came from its mines. Saxon miners and merchants from Dubrovnik who already had worked in other parts of Macedonia settled here. The town was first mentioned under its current name in 1330. Gold, silver, lead, iron and copper were mined in the immediate vicinity and in wider surroundings of the town. During the reign of Emperor Stefan Dušan of Serbia the mines of Kratovo were the prime source of wealth of despot Jovan Oliver. After his death, during the fall of the Empire under Stefan Uroš V the town came into the hands of the Dejan family. Konstantin Dejan minted his silver coins here. The Ragusan merchant colony grew larger and took over the best part of trading .

In 1389, during his attack on Prince Lazar, Ottoman sultan Murad I stopped in Kratovo to gather information and hold a war council. Next year, in 1390, his son, Bayezid, captured it from the Dejan and put his official (emin) to reside here. Kratovo was the seat of a nahiya, as a part of the Sanjak of Kyustendil, as well as a kaza, seat of a kadi/judge, engulfing not only the town's vicinity but also Štip, Kočani and Nagoričani.

In the 15th century, Kratovo was a very important mining town, inhabited by many wealthy and educated men, such as the writer Dimitar, or Marin, son of the priest Radonja, who in 1449 donated the whole sum needed for the fresco painting of the Prohor Pčinjski monastery. In 1484 Jovan Konik and Stefan, son of Branko, both from Kratovo, paid an amazing 16,424,000 akçe for a three-year rent of mints in Novo Brdo, Skopje and Serres. As a trade center Kratovo was also settled by Sephardic Jews. Kratovo was an important stop for Ottoman sultans: in 1455, before an attack on Novo Brdo, the Ottoman army regrouped here.

In the Late Middle Ages, Kratovo was also home to a sizeable Albanian population. In 15th century Ottoman defters, an Albanian (Arnavud) church is mentioned in Kratovo. In the 1467-68 defter, Albanian onomastics appear among the neighbourhoods and inhabitants of Kratovo. The town of Kratovo is mentioned with the mahallahas (neighbourhoods) of Pala Gjoni with these heads of households: Jon-ko Burrnik, Pavli Jon-ko, Stepan Burrnik,; the mahalla of Radič with these heads of households: Nikolla Arbanas, Gjon domuzet, Kozma, son of Nikolla, Arbanash, Dimitri Ulko, Peja Gego, Gjergj Nikolla, Nikolla Arnaut, Bard (Bardh) Arnaut-i; the mahalla of Mahi with these heads of households: Andrenik Pavli, Gjergj Pavli, Marko Lazori, Pavli Dimitri, Petro Dimitri, Gjin Gjorgji (Gjergji), Mojsa Lazor-i; the mahalla Terzi with these heads of households: Gjon terzi, Andreja Petra, Roman Petra, Simon Marko and others. In the timar defter of 1530, the mahallah of Kodra Kuqe, meaning "red hill" in Albanian, is mentioned in Kratovo. Besides the city, Albanians also inhabited villages around Kratovo, such as the village of Kotraç (Kodra-ç). An inscription bearing the name Arvanь-a, has also been found in Kratovo, believed to be from the Middle Ages. The name evolved from Arban, with a consonant change of rb to rv.

=== Early modern period ===
In the 16th century Kratovo ranked among the most important mining towns in the European part of the Ottoman Empire. The mint was opened in Kratovo in the last decade of the 15th century and immediately it became the second largest producer of coins in the Ottoman Empire (just after Novo Brdo), making mostly silver akce, and later gold coins as well. However, from 1520 to 1540 minting and mining were in great crisis and many of the tenants, all of them local Christians, could not pay their leases and were imprisoned. Also, between 1519 and 1530 the number of Christian households dwindled from 982 to 606. After the reform and codification of the craft, the mining and minting recovered around mid-century. In 1550 C. Zeno noted in his travelogue that the Ottoman sultan gets 70,000 ducats from Kratovo. The official accounts of that year tell of benefits of 1,111,555 akce. However, due to the opening of new mints, this fell down to just 573,099 akce in 1573.

The mines were managed by their renters who held the title of a duke (knez). Most of them were Christians. Amongst these wealthy men who were the first among all men in Kratovo we find Dimitrije Pepić with his brothers or Andrija and Nikola Bojičić, who gave money for renovation of many churches around Macedonia (for instance Lesnovo Monastery). The inhabitants of Goldsmiths' and Minters' quarters, both Muslims and Christians, were businessmen who were famous for their investments in opening new mines such as Kučajna, Majdanpek or Kremkovica, or for leasing mints in other centers, for instance in Novo Brdo.

Such activity continued in early 17th century, but later in that century, around 1660 when Kratovo was visited by Evliya Çelebi the mint has stopped its operation. The town was commanded by an ayan. Seven mines were active, yielding mostly silver and copper, but a lot of ore was brought from Osogovo and mountains around Kjustendil. Miners were locals who for their works in mines enjoyed certain freedoms and did not have to pay any taxes. Catholic bishop of Skopje Petar Bogdani reports in 1685 that Kratovo has 300 houses and 8 strong towers. At the time Kratovo was also famous for its copper products which were considered to be the best in the Ottoman Empire.

In 1637 Archbishop Gjergj Bardhi visited Kratovo. Among its inhabitants he also reported Albanian immigrants (»dalli monti di Albania«); they were Catholic Albanians but spoke Serbian and Turkish. Their priest was of Albanian descent but spoke Serbian. When the Archbishop of Antivari visited Kratovo in February 1639, he found that all 38 Catholic families were immigrants from Dibra in Albania, who could now understand the "Illyrian" (Serbian) language. In 1639 the number of Catholics in Kratovo was 358, all Albanians. Most of these would convert to Islam around 1645, with Visitator Gaspari finding only 15 Catholics in 1671. The demographic figures for Kratovo from 1638/39 record: 300 Muslim, 100 Orthodox, 40 Jewish and 38 Catholic (Albanian) houses.

In 1689 town was taken by the advancing Habsburg forces. However, they soon retreated and Kratvo was burned down in retaliation. A lot of people left the town together with the Habsburg army; in early 18th century we find some of them living in Taban, the Serb suburb of Buda (today a part of Budapest). After this disaster most of the mining activity in the area was taken over by Zletovo and Probištip.

=== Modern ===
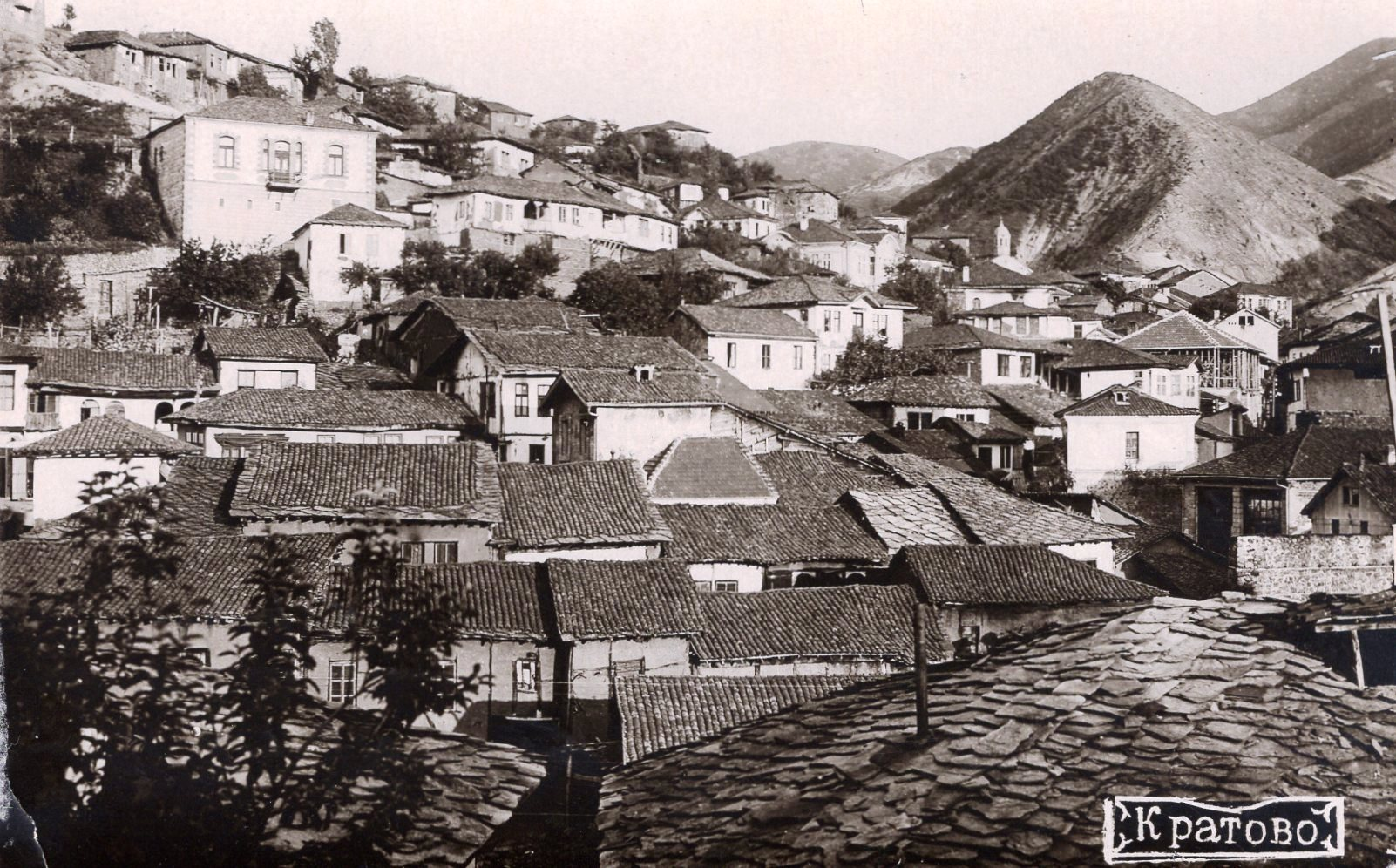
Postcard of Kratovo, Macedonia from the 1930s

It seems that the mining recovered only in the first half of the 19th century. In 1829 a local aga managed the mines. However, mining was now done on a much smaller scale: Amu Bue in 1836 found only two furnaces working, both in bad condition, and some 5,000 – 6,000 inhabitants. Later in that century the work was carried out by forced labor force recruited in villages from the region and many families have left the area because of it.

In 1905 Kratovo had a Bulgarian lower grammar school and two primary schools while the Serbs had two primary schools. Each community held one of town churches.

After the Battle of Kumanovo, Chetnik paramilitary groups supported by the Serbian Army attacked and expelled the Albanian populations of Kratovo. Leo Freundlich, a journalist who traveled in the Balkans during the Balkan Wars observed massacres against Albanians committed in Kratovo. He wrote that: "Near Kratovo, General Stefanovic, having ordered hundreds of Albanians to form two rows, shot them down with machine guns. Thereupon, the general explained: These scoundrels must be exterminated so that Austria may no longer be able to find her darlings"

== Demographics ==
According to the 2002 census Kratovo had 6,924 inhabitants Ethnic groups in the village include:

Macedonians: 6,724

Romani: 151

Other: 49

According to the 2021 census Kratovo had 5,791 inhabitants:

Macedonians: 5,401

Romani: 99

Other: 31

People taken from administrative sources: 259

== Culture ==
Kratovo is known for its many reminders from the past. One of its symbols are its stone towers. Once there were twelve of them, but now there are only six towers remaining (Saat or Clock Tower, Simić, Krstev, Eminbeg, Zlatković and Hadži Kostov Tower). The towers were built in late Middle Ages, starting from late 14th century and were used not only for protection but also as storage rooms.

The Kratovo bridges are another characteristic of this town made by old masters.

The town has unique architecture from the 19th century and a unique Art gallery of children's drawings, with pictures by Kratovo children which have won numerous prizes at different international exhibitions.

Currently many organizations are working on rebuilding the city. One of the most valiant of these efforts comes from the University of Florida Engineering Without Borders program who are currently working on the development of a sustainable solid waste system to aid the efforts of North Macedonia in attaining recognition in the European Union.

== Language ==
Situated in the north, the locals traditionally speak in the Kumanovo-Kratovo dialect of the Macedonian language.

== Sports ==
The most popular sports club from Kratovo is FK Sileks football club and they play their games at the Gradski stadion Kratovo. They have won the Macedonian league title three times in the late 1990s.

== See also ==
- Stone town of Kuklica
- Kratovo municipality
- North Macedonia
