= Kratovo Municipality =

Municipality of North Macedonia

Coordinates: 42.0781°N 22.1728°E

Municipality of Kratovo Општина Кратово
- Urban municipality
- Flag Seal

- Location within North Macedonia
- Country: North Macedonia
- Region: Northeastern
- Municipal seat: Kratovo

Government
  - Mayor: Todorče Nikolovski (VMRO-DPMNE)

Area
  - Total: 375.44 km^{2} (144.96 sq mi)

Population
  - Total: 7,545
  - Density: 27.81/km^{2} (72.0/sq mi)
- Time zone: UTC+1 (CET)
- Postal code: 1360
- Area code: 031
- Vehicle registration: KR
- Website: http://www.OpstinaKratovo.gov.mk

Kratovo (Macedonian: Кратово [ˈkratɔvɔ]) is a municipality in the eastern part of North Macedonia. Kratovo is also the name of the town where the municipal seat is located. The municipality is part of the Northeastern Statistical Region.

== Geography ==
The municipality borders the Staro Nagoričane Municipality and the Kriva Palanka Municipality to the north, the Kočani Municipality to the east, the Kumanovo Municipality to the west and the Probištip Municipality to the south.

== Demographics ==
According to the 2021 North Macedonia census, the Kratovo Municipality has 7,545 residents. Ethnic groups in the municipality:

| | 2002 | | 2021 | |
| | Number | % | Number | % |
| TOTAL | 10,441 | 100 | 7,545 | 100 |
| Macedonians | 10,231 | 97.99 | 6,961 | 92.26 |
| Roma | 151 | 1.45 | 100 | 1.33 |
| Serbs | 33 | 0.32 | 14 | 0.19 |
| Albanians | | | 8 | 0.11 |
| Vlachs | 1 | 0.01 | 1 | 0.01 |
| Turks | 8 | 0.07 | | |
| Other / Undeclared / Unknown | 17 | 0.16 | 24 | 0.31 |
| Persons for whom data are taken from administrative sources | | | 437 | 5.79 |

Demographics of the Kratovo Municipality
| Census year | Population |
|---|---|
| 1994 | 10,898 |
| 2002 | 10,441 |
| 2021 | 7,545 |

== Inhabited places ==
| Inhabited places in the Kratovo Municipality |
|---|
villages: Blizanci (Близанци) | Vakuf (Вакуф) | Gorno Kratovo (Горно Кратово) | Dimonce (Димонце) | Emirica (Емирица) | Železnica (Железница) | Živalevo (Живалево) | Kavrak (Каврак) | Ketenovo (Кетеново) | Kneževo (Кнежево) | Kojkovo (Којково) | Konjuh (Коњух) | Krilatica (Крилатица) | Kuklica (Куклица) | Kunovo (Куново) | Lukovo (Луково) | Muškovo (Мушково) | Nežilovo (Нежилово) | Pendak (Пендак) | Prikovci (Приковци) | Sekulica (Секулица) | Stracin (Страцин) | Talašmance (Талашманце) | Tatomir (Татомир) | Topolovik (Тополовиќ) | Trnovac (Трновац) | Turalevo (Туралево) | Filipovci (Филиповци) | Šlegovo (Шлегово) | Šopsko Rudare (Шопско Рударе) | Towns: Kratovo (Кратово)

== Notable people ==
- Ivica Ampov (born 1969), military officer
