= Mihailo Bojčić =

Mihailo Bojčić (Serbian Cyrillic: Михаило Бојчић; Kratovo, late 16th or early 17th century – Chilandar, 1669) was the Metropolitan of Kratovo from 1648 to 1660. The House of Bojčić held the title of dukes of Kratovo and were associated with Dimitrije Pepić, who owned the mines in the surrounding region.

== Family and youth ==
Mihailo was born at the turn of the 17th century in the city of Kratovo. He came from a family of local dukes, Bojčićs (alternative spelling: Bojičić), rich merchants who controlled the famous mines. As the Ottoman authorities tightened control of Kratovo reducing its autonomy, his father, duke Nikola Bojčić, decided to become a monk. After that he turned Mihailo, still a young man, to the custody of the Serbian Patriarch Pajsije I.

Mihailo spent his youth in the Patriarchal Monastery of Peć and was ordained as an archdeacon. He served at patriarch's residency for eleven years and, since Pajsije was a lover of books, he got a very good education.

== Metropolitan of Kratovo ==
In 1648 Pajsije's successor Gavrilo I ordained Mihailo as the metropolitan of his native Kratovo. During his service as Kratovo metropolitan Mihailo used also longer titles such as „metropolitan of Kolasija, Kratovo, Štip and Radomir“, „of Banja, Kratovo and Štip“, of Kolasija, called Banja, of Radomir, Sirištinca, Kratovo, Palanka, Štip and Radoviš, „of Kolasija and the Serb land of Kratovo“.

== Refuge and travels ==
Due to the quarrels with the Turks Mihailo had to flee Kratovo already in 1649. Perhaps this happened for the same reason a few years later patriarch Gavrilo I had to flee for Russia: due to the War of Candia the Ottomans were very suspicious of any connections with the West, which the Serbian Patriarchs cherished, hoping for material help of the impoverished and highly taxed church. Mihailo left for the Serb monastery on Mount Athos, Chilandar, where he stayed for two years. He made Chilandar his new home and left a good impression with the brotherhood. Despite his refuge, Mihailo continued to be the metropolitan of Kratovo.

In 1651 he traveled to Russia to collect donations for Chilandar and the Patriarchal Monastery of Peć. While this was usual for monks, it was not so often that high church officials went to such missions. In that year we find Mihailo in Putivl, where from he wrote to church authorities asking them to allow him to stay in Russia. However, he stayed only until Easter of 1654 when he once again came to Mount Athos.

In 1656 he went onto a pilgrimage visiting Jerusalem on Easter 1657. From there he traveled back to Russia via Egypt, Constantinople, Mount Athos, Moldavia, Wallachia and Poland. He stayed in Russia until 1660.

The last years of his life Mihailo spent in Chilandar where he lived in the hermit's cell of Saint Nicholas. His skull is still preserved in a box in this very cell.

== Mihailo’s nationality ==
In 1651 Mihailo wrote to the Russian Emperor "My forefathers and ancestors are dukes of the Serbian land of Kratovo" (Roditelji i praroditelji moji su srpske zemlje grada Kratova kneževi).

Next year, in the documents of Russian Imperial House, it is recorded that "Serb Metropolitan Mihailo" (serbskii mitropolit Mihailo) had dinner with the Russian Emperor.

In 1653 hieromonk Damaskin wrote a letter to his spiritual father metropolitan Mihailo in which there is a statement about mercy of the Russian Emperor towards "our Serbian language" (jeziku nashemu Srbskom).

== Bibliography ==
- Вуковић, Сава (1996). Српски јерарси од деветог до двадесетог века (Serbian Hierarchs from the 9th to the 20th Century). Евро, Унирекс, Каленић.
