= Ketenovo =

Ketenovo Кетеново
- Village
- Location within North Macedonia
- Coordinates: 42.105358°N 22.088462°E
- Country: North Macedonia
- Region: Northeastern
- Municipality: Kratovo

Population (2002)
  - Total: 216
- Time zone: UTC+1 (CET)
  - Summer (DST): UTC+2 (CEST)
- Website: .

Ketenovo (Macedonian: Кетеново) is a village in the municipality of Kratovo, North Macedonia.

== Demographics ==
According to the 2002 census, the village had a total of 216 inhabitants. Ethnic groups in the village include:

- Macedonians 215
- Other 1
