= Stracin =

Stracin Страцин
- Village
- Location within North Macedonia
- Coordinates: 42°09′02″N 22°01′56″E
- Country: North Macedonia
- Region: Northeastern
- Municipality: Kratovo
- Elevation: 732 m (2,402 ft)

Population (2002)
  - Total: 185
- Time zone: UTC+1 (CET)
  - Summer (DST): UTC+2 (CEST)

Stracin or Stratsin (Macedonian: Страцин) is a village in the municipality of Kratovo, North Macedonia.

== Demographics ==
According to the 2002 census, the village had a total of 185 inhabitants. Ethnic groups in the village include:

- Macedonians 183
- Serbs 2
