= Železnica =

Železnica Железница
- Village
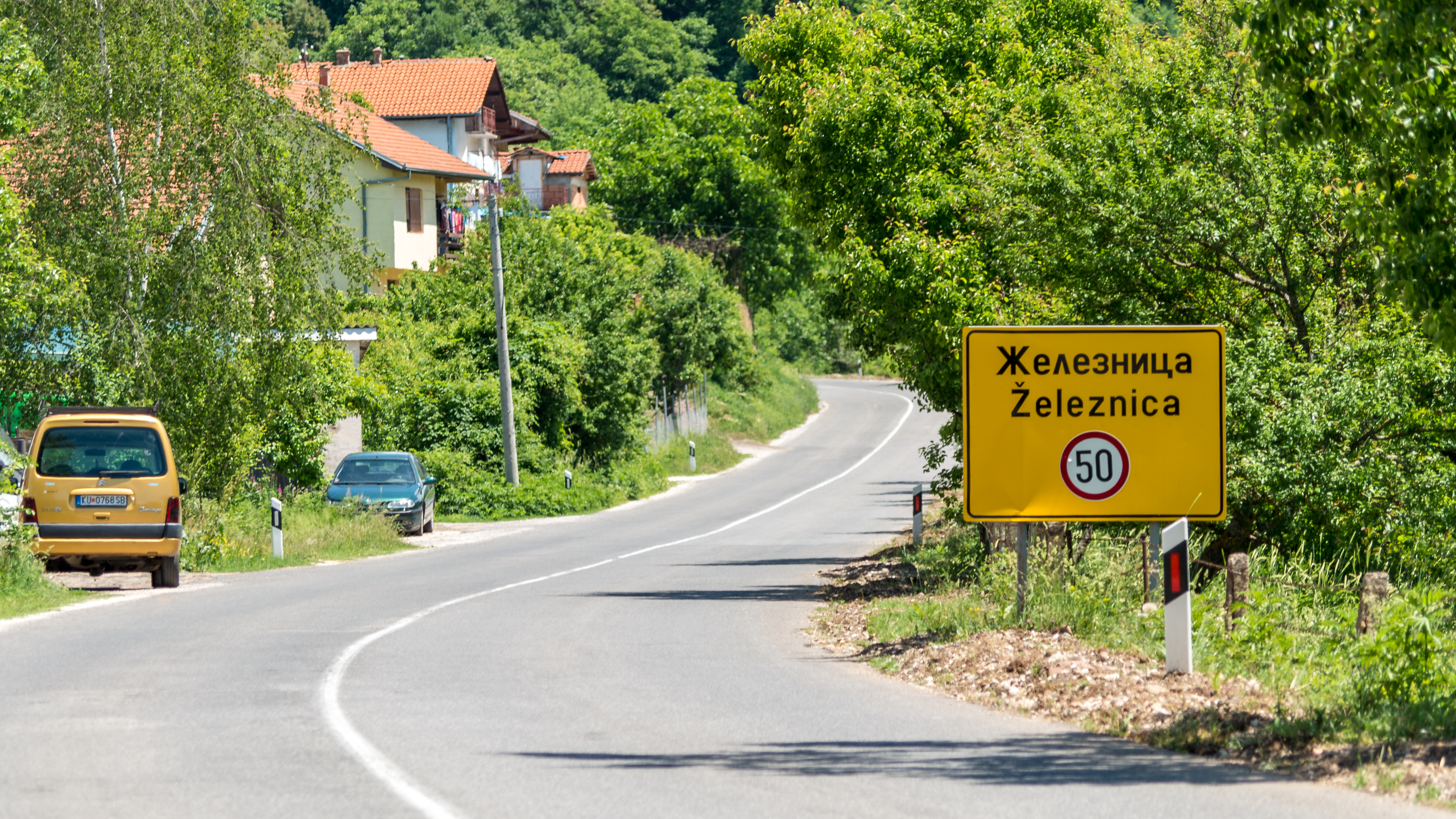

- Location within North Macedonia
- Coordinates: 42.084343°N 22.151422°E
- Country: North Macedonia
- Region: Northeastern
- Municipality: Kratovo

Population (2002)
  - Total: 220
- Time zone: UTC+1 (CET)
  - Summer (DST): UTC+2 (CEST)
- Website: .

Železnica (Macedonian: Железница) is a village in the municipality of Kratovo, North Macedonia.

== Demographics ==
According to the 2002 census, the village had a total of 220 inhabitants. The village's population is exclusively Macedonian.
