= Ivica Ampov =

Macedonian military officer (born 1969)

- Born: 31 October 1969 (age 55); Kratovo, Yugoslavia
- Occupation: Chief of G2 of ARM

Ivica Panche Ampov (born October 31, 1969) is a Macedonian military officer who is colonel of the Army of the Republic of North Macedonia. He was Chief of the Macedonian Military Intelligence from 2009 to 2012. Since 2023, he has been Macedonia's military representative to NATO and the European Union.

Military offices
Preceded by Vančo Šontevski	Chief of the Military Service for Security and Intelligence (2009-present)	Incumbent
