= Krilatica =

Krilatica Крилатица
- Village
- Location within North Macedonia
- Coordinates: 42.125721°N 22.119407°E
- Country: North Macedonia
- Region: Northeastern
- Municipality: Kratovo

Population (2002)
  - Total: 141
- Time zone: UTC+1 (CET)
  - Summer (DST): UTC+2 (CEST)
- Website: .

Krilatica (Macedonian: Крилатица) is a village in the municipality of Kratovo, North Macedonia.

== Demographics ==
According to the 2002 census, the village had a total of 141 inhabitants. The ethnic population of the village composes 140 Macedonians and one person listed as an "other".
