= List of Serbs of Montenegro =

This is a list of notable Serbs of Montenegro.

== Arts ==
- Lazar Komarčić, writer
- Miodrag Bulatović, writer
- Marko Car, writer
- Danica Crnogorčević, singer
- Vlado Georgiev, singer
- Žarko Laušević, actor
- Petar Lubarda, painter
- Marinko Madžgalj, actor and singer
- Stjepan Mitrov Ljubiša, writer
- Marko Miljanov, writer
- Niggor, musician
- Stefan Paštrović, writer
- Borislav Pekić, writer
- Risto Stijović, sculptor
- Božidar Vuković, printer

== Medieval nobility ==
- Jelena Balšić, Grand Duchess of Bosnia
- Constantine Bodin, King of Duklja
- Miroslav of Hum, Prince of Zachumlia
- Stefan Nemanja, Grand Prince of the Serbian Grand Principality
- Stefan Štiljanović, nobleman
- Jovan Vladimir, Prince of Duklja
- Stefan Vojislav, Prince of Duklja
- Mihailo Vojislavljević, King of Duklja

== Military ==
- Pavle Đurišić, Chetnik commander
- Blagoje Jovović, Chetnik fighter and assassin
- Zaharije Ostojić, Chetnik commander
- Radomir Vešović, general
- Janko Vukotić, general

== Politics ==
- Radoman Božović, Prime Minister of Serbia
- Marko Daković, politician
- Prince Danilo, Prince of Montenegro
- Goran Danilović, President of the United Montenegro political party
- Milovan Đilas, President of the Assembly of Yugoslavia
- Radovan Karadžić, President of Republika Srpska
- Milan Knežević, President of the Democratic People's Party
- Branko Kostić, member of the Presidency of Yugoslavia
- Zdravko Krivokapić, Prime Minister of Montenegro
- Andrija Mandić, President of the Parliament of Montenegro and President of the New Serb Democracy
- Nicholas I, King of Montenegro
- Andrija Radović, Prime Minister of Montenegro
- Puniša Račić, politician
- Lazar Tomanović, Prime Minister of Montenegro
- Branislav Šoškić, President of the Presidency of Montenegro
- Zoran Žižić, Prime Minister of Serbia and Montenegro

== Religion ==
- Arsenije III Crnojević, Archbishop of Peć and Serbian Patriarch
- Danilo I, Metropolitan of Cetinje
- Mitrofan Ban, Metropolitan of Montenegro
- Gavrilo V, Serbian Patriarch
- Joanikije Lipovac, Metropolitan of Montenegro
- Visarion Ljubiša, Metropolitan of Montenegro
- Jevstatije I, Archbishop of Peć and Serbian Patriarch
- Joanikije Mićović, Metropolitan of Montenegro and Littoral
- Sava Petrović, Metropolitan of Cetinje
- Vasilije Petrović, Metropolitan of Cetinje
- Petar I Petrović-Njegoš, Metropolitan of Cetinje
- Petar II Petrović-Njegoš, Metropolitan of Cetinje
- Arsenije Plamenac, Metropolitan of Cetinje
- Amfilohije Radović, Metropolitan of Montenegro and Littoral
- Ilarion Roganović, Metropolitan of Montenegro
- Stephen of Piperi, monk
- Varnava, Serbian Patriarch

== Science ==
- Branko Petranović, historian
- Gavro Vuković, jurist

== Sports ==
- Stefan Babović, football player
- Vladimir Batez, volleyball player
- Katarina Bulatović, handball player
- Ana Dabović, basketball player
- Dejan Dabović, water polo player
- Milica Dabović, basketball player
- Ana Đokić, handball player
- Vladimir Gojković, water polo player
- Ivica Kralj, football player
- Žarko Knežević, basketball player
- Milorad Krivokapić, water polo player
- Miloš Janičić, mixed martial artist
- Dragoslav Jevrić, football player
- Dušan Mandić, water polo player
- Slobodan Marović, football player
- Mijajlo Marsenić, handball player
- Nikola Mirotić, basketball player
- Ivan Nikčević, handball player
- Miloš Nikić, volleyball player
- Žarko Paspalj, basketball player
- Aleksandar Pavlović, basketball player
- Nikola Peković, basketball player
- Đorđe Perišić, water polo player
- Nenad Peruničić, handball player
- Predrag Peruničić, handball player
- Bojana Popović, handball player
- Silvija Popović, volleyball player
- Andrija Prlainović, water polo player
- Milos Raonic, tennis player
- Nikola Sjekloća, boxer
- Darko Stanić, handball player
- Žarko Varajić, basketball player
- Nemanja Vico, water polo player
- Marija Vuković, track and field athlete
- Nikola Vučević, basketball player
- Rajko Žižić, basketball player

== See also ==
- List of Serbs
- List of Serbs of Bosnia and Herzegovina
- List of Serbs of Croatia
- List of Serbs of North Macedonia
