= Šlegovo =

Šlegovo Шлегово
- Village
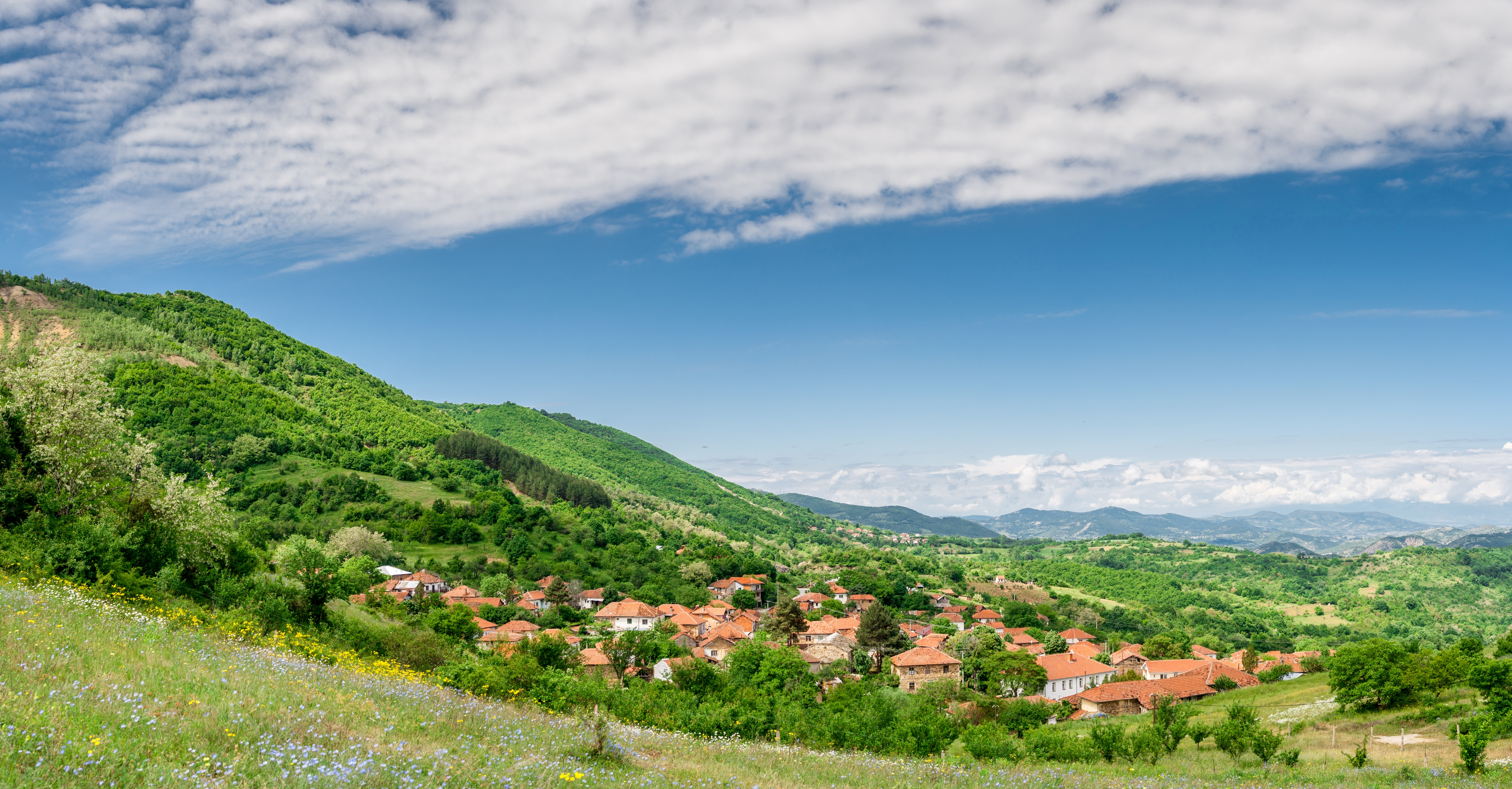
- Panoramic photo of the village Šlegovo

- Location within North Macedonia
- Country: North Macedonia
- Region: Northeastern
- Municipality: Kratovo

Population (2002)
  - Total: 373
- Time zone: UTC+1 (CET)
  - Summer (DST): UTC+2 (CEST)
- Website: .

Šlegovo (Macedonian: Куклица) is a small village in the municipality of Kratovo, North Macedonia. It is believed that it was founded and settled by Sasi-German Saxons.

== Demographics ==
According to the 2002 census, the village had a total of 373 inhabitants. Ethnic groups in the village include:

- Macedonians 372
- Serbs 1
