= Clock tower (Kratovo) =

Medieval tower in North Macedonia

- Саат-кула; Saat-kula
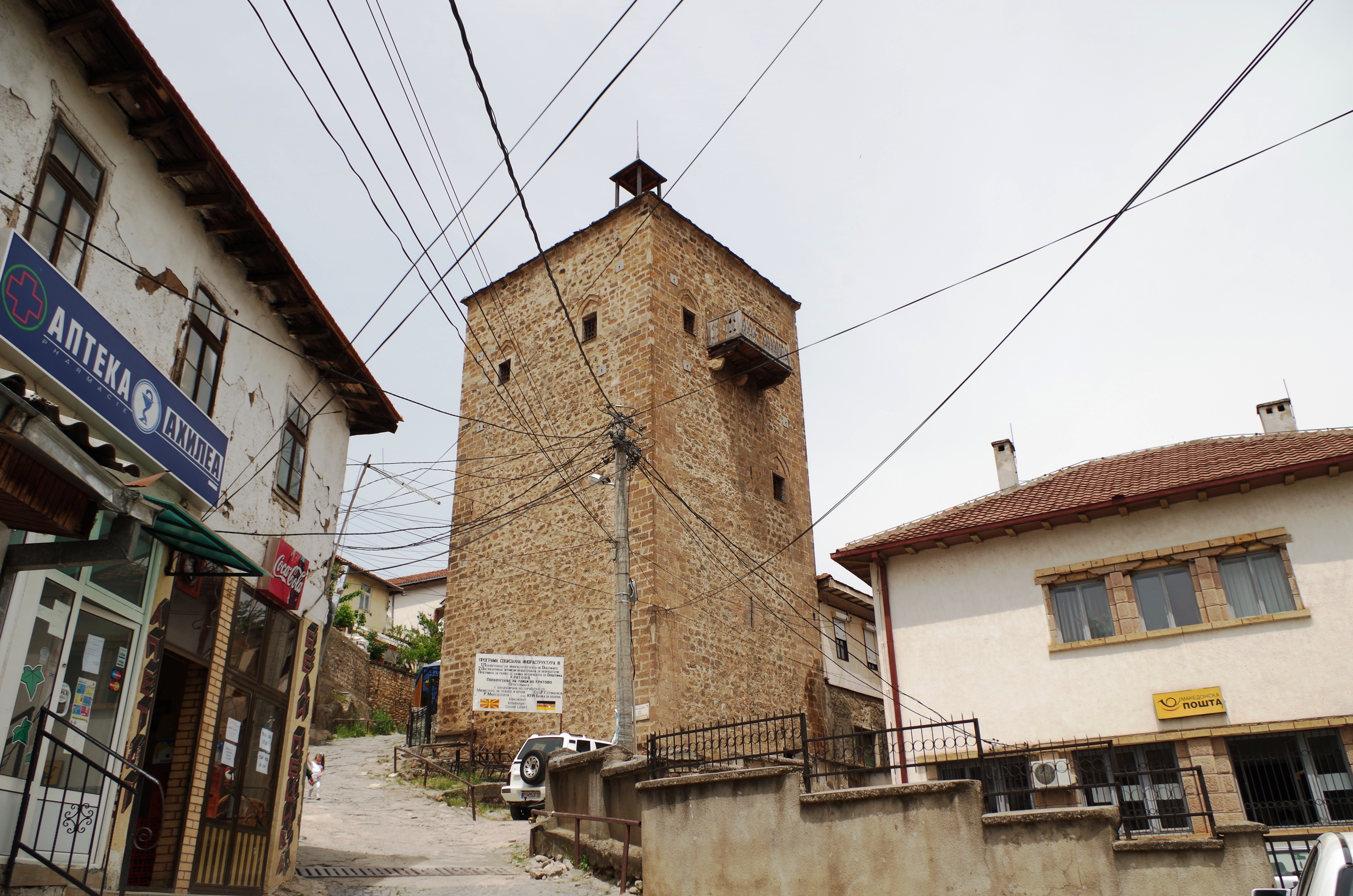
- View of the Clock tower in Kratovo
- Interactive map of the Clock tower area

General information
- Status: Monument of Culture
- Type: Tower
- Location: Kratovo, North Macedonia
- Coordinates: 42°4′44.89″N 22°10′54.45″E
- Estimated completion: c. 1372
- Owner: Museum of Kratovo

Technical details
- Floor count: 4

The Clock Tower of Kratovo is a clock tower in the town of Kratovo, one of the six towers remaining from the town's medieval and Ottoman period. Since 2008, the tower belongs under the jurisdiction of the Museum of Kratovo.

== History ==
It is built in 1372 by the Serbian magnate Konstantin Dejanović. Ottoman beys used to live there during the Ottoman period. The tower got its name with the installation of the town's clock in 1921, with the initiative of the then town administration. The clock worked until 1970.

=== Restoration ===
In 2004, the Ministry of Culture funded the tower's first partial repairment, reconstruction and remodeled with small exhibits located on the first and second floor, whereas on the third floor visitors can rest in a comfortable setting while looking at medieval Kratovo through the windows or the balcony.

== Structure and features ==
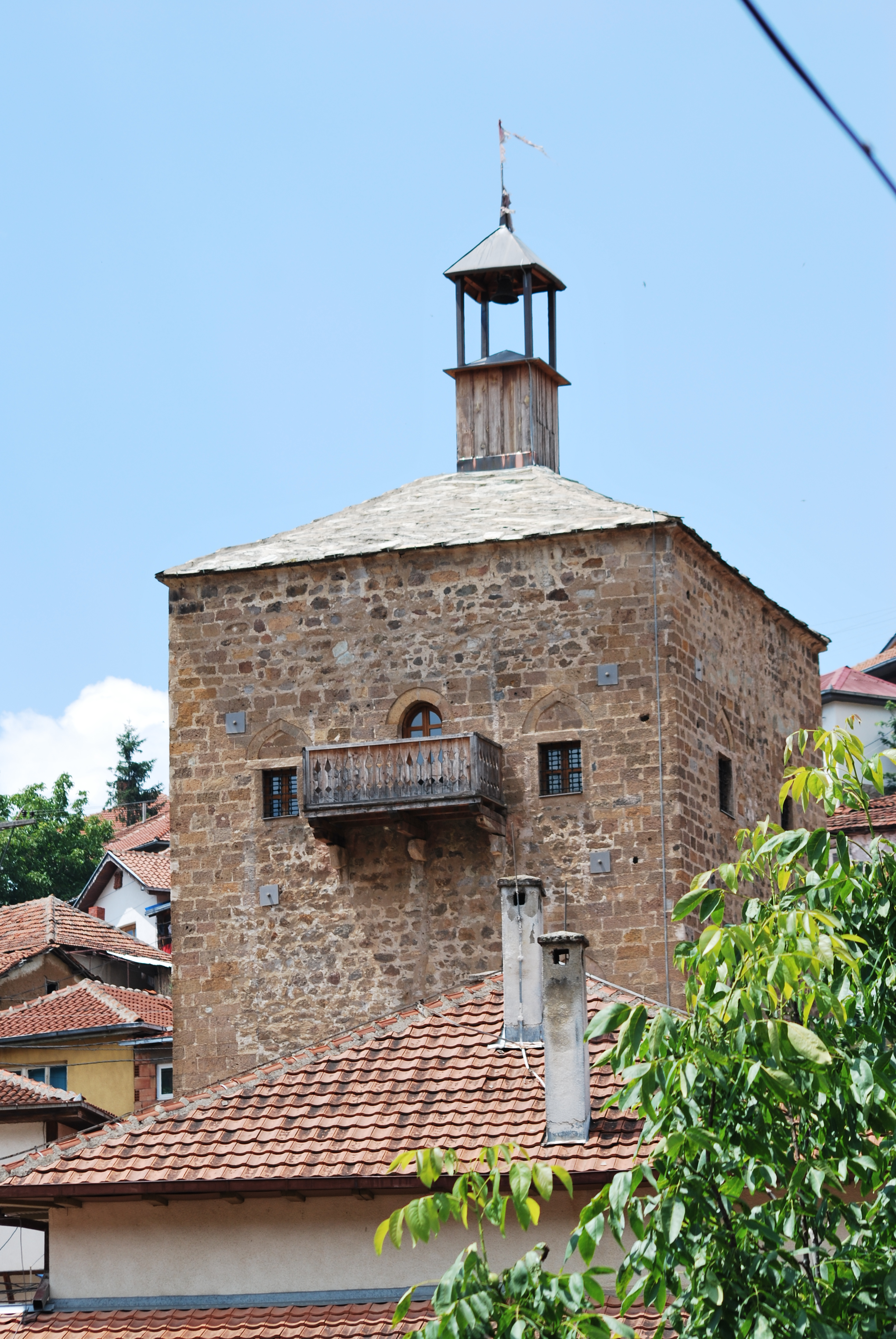
Eastern view of the tower.

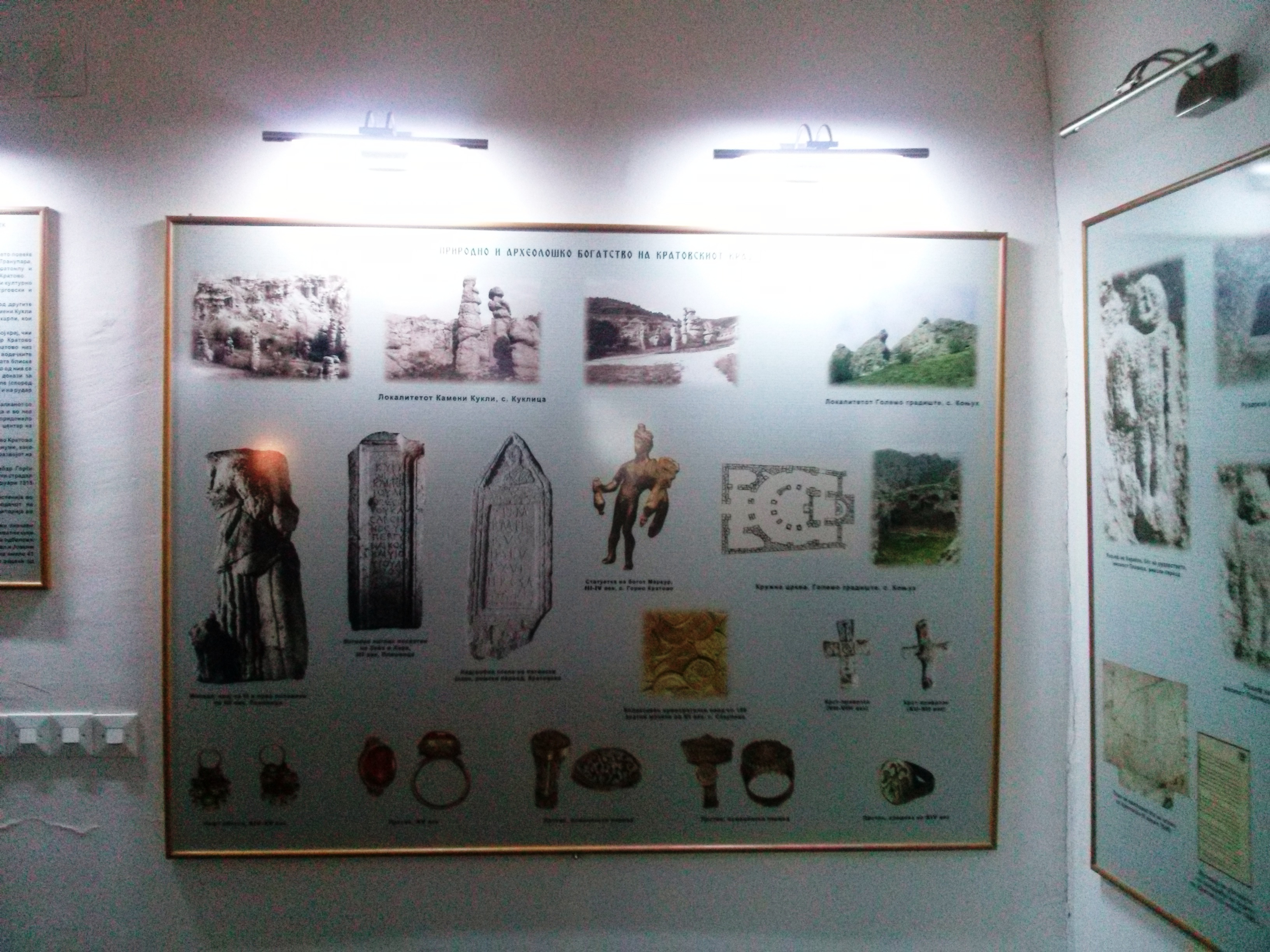
An exhibit in the tower.

The tower is rectangular and it is made from crushed stone taken from the town's outskirts, and the roof is made from stone tiles probably brought from the mountain of Lisec. The towers' interior is divided into four floors. The windows are protected by iron bars and come in different sizes - narrower and elongated in the lower part, and wider in the upper floors.

The first floor is windowless and can be entered from the south-eastern side. On this floor, the precious ore was kept. On the second floor there is one small window from the south-eastern side. Also on the second floor, the fire stove is located on the north-eastern side. The third floor is quite illuminated by three windows. Like the second floor, it also has a fire stove on the same position. The inside walls are well plastered and they are nicely decorated. The fourth floor is the most splendid. Here, the cubed dome is located, made out of chipped stone. The height, starting from the floor and up to top of the arc, is 6.75 metres (22.1 ft). The walls are plastered and its corners are decorated with pantatives. This top floor can be exited via two balconies on the south-eastern and the north-western side. The floor has five windows. On that floor, the clock mechanism was positioned.

Within the tower there is a small museum exhibit titled "Kratovo Since the Earliest Times Until Today" which portrays Kratovo through the centuries.

== Gallery ==
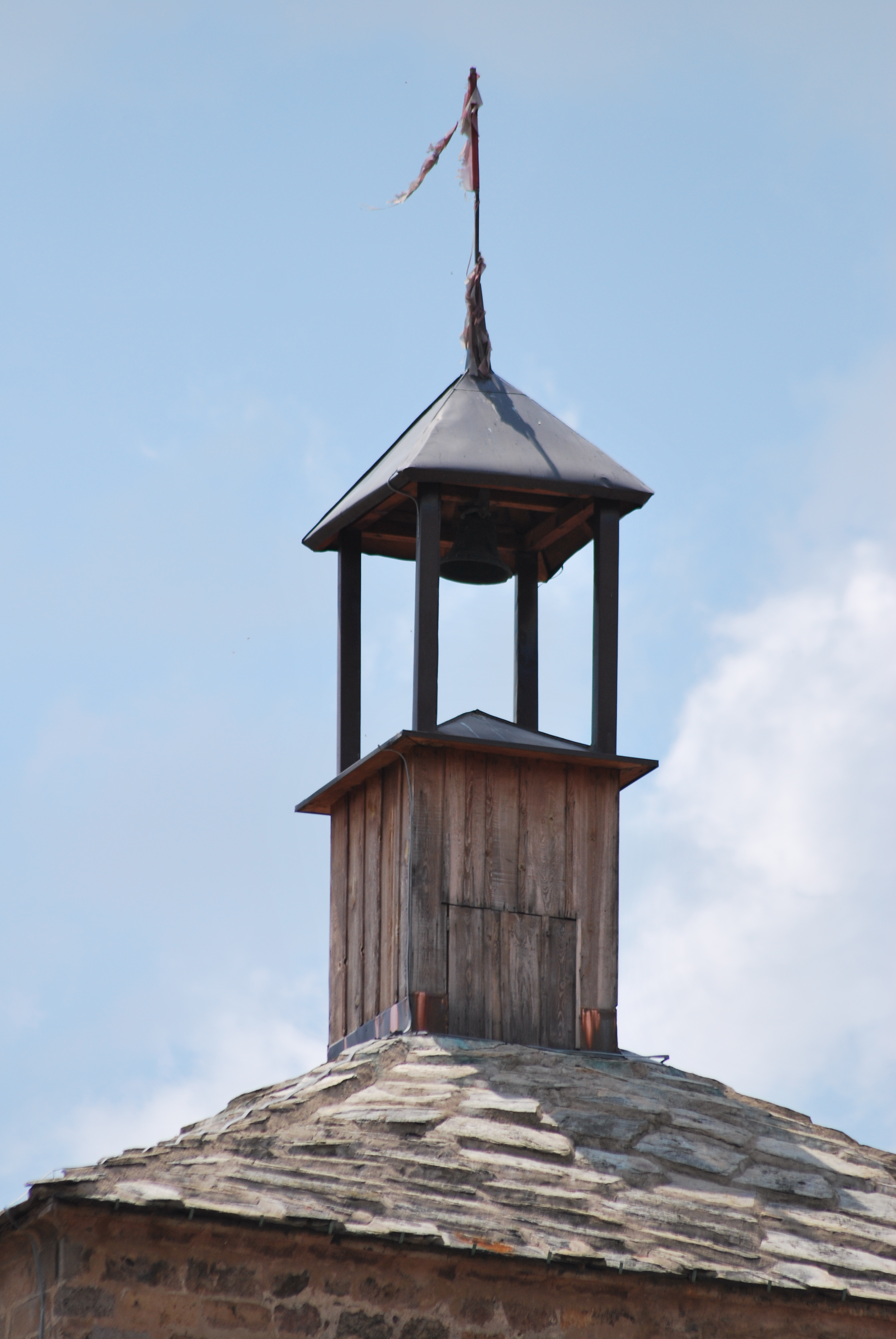
The highest point

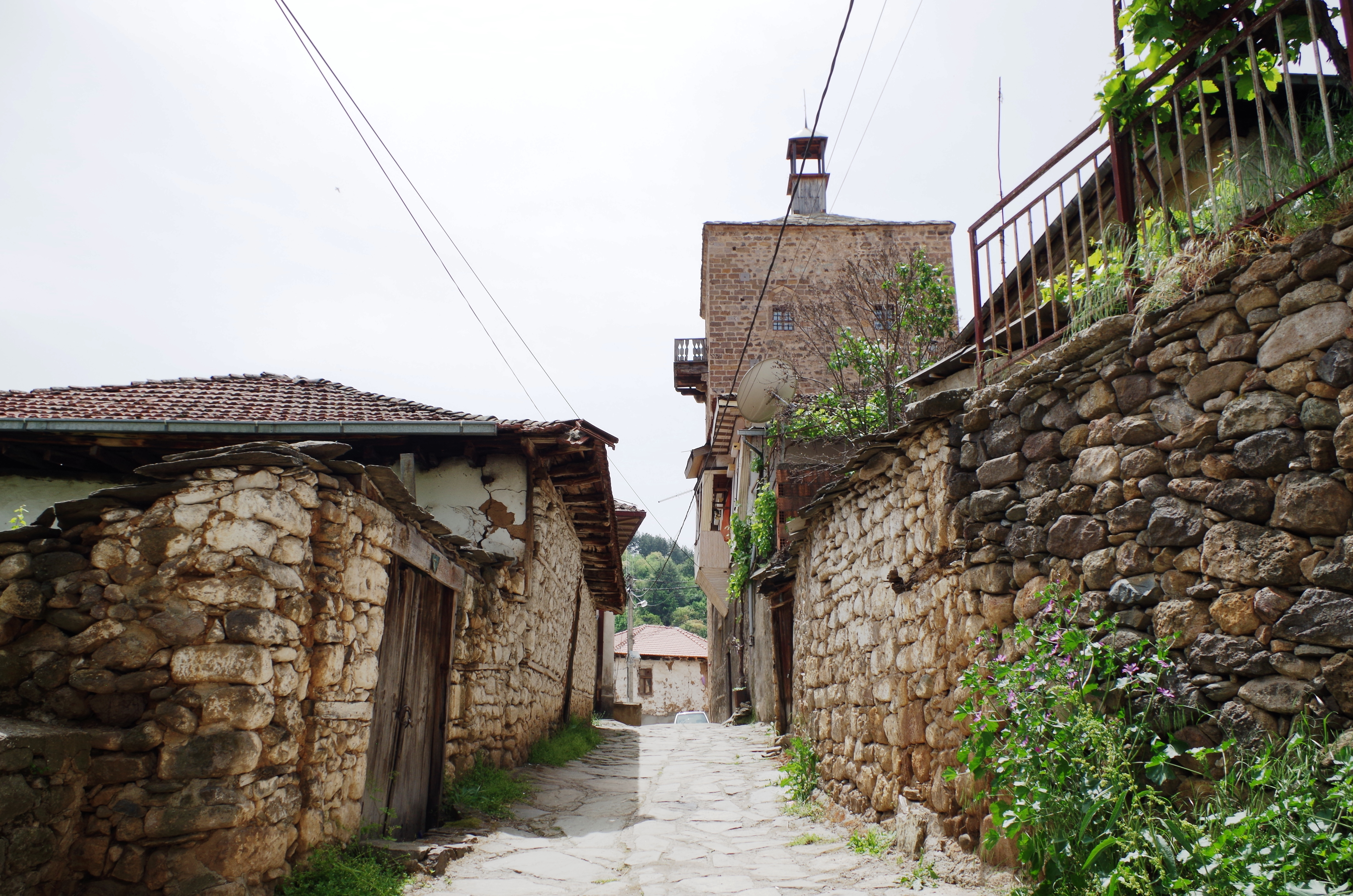
The building photographed from the north

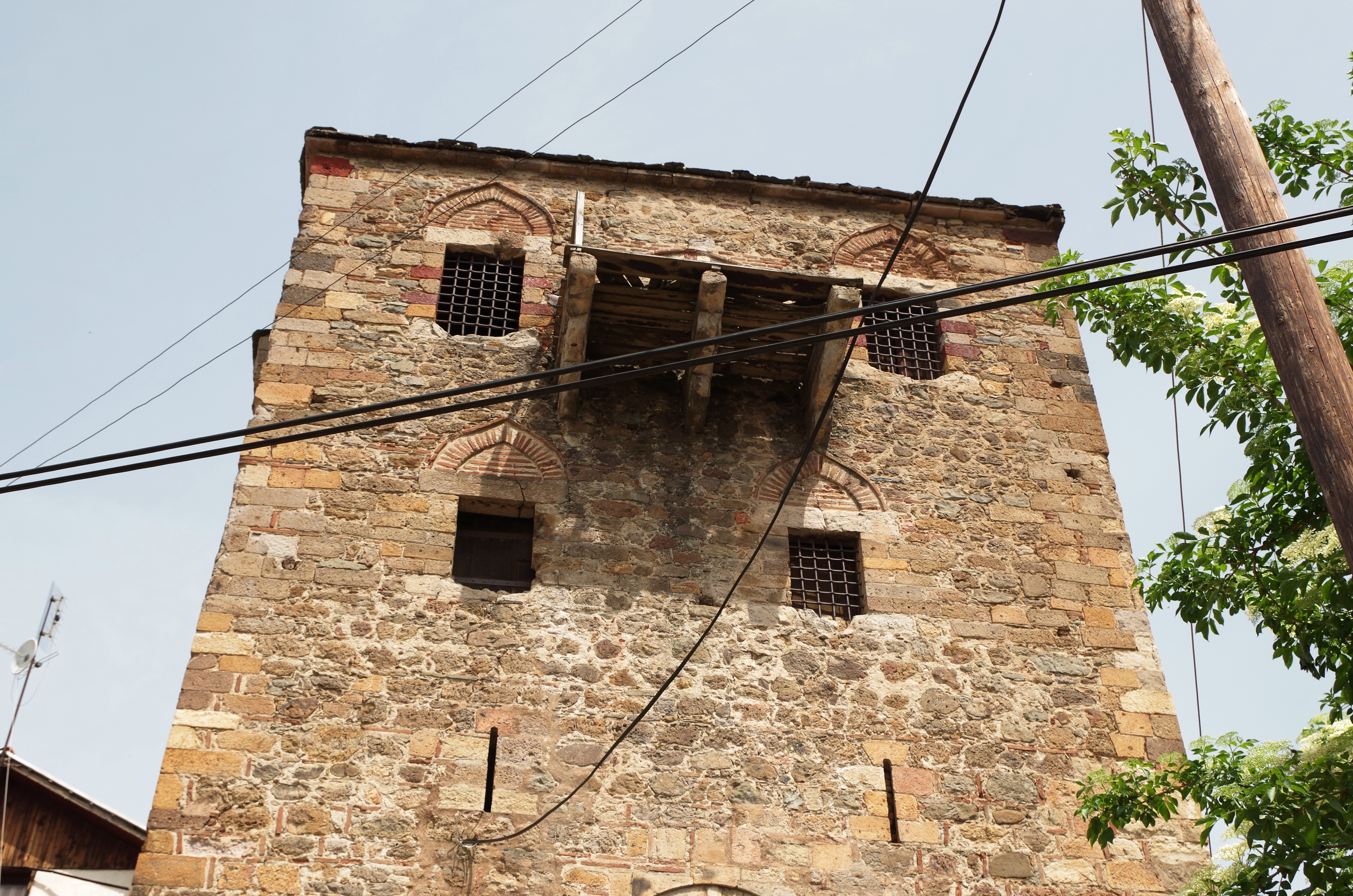
The north-western terrace

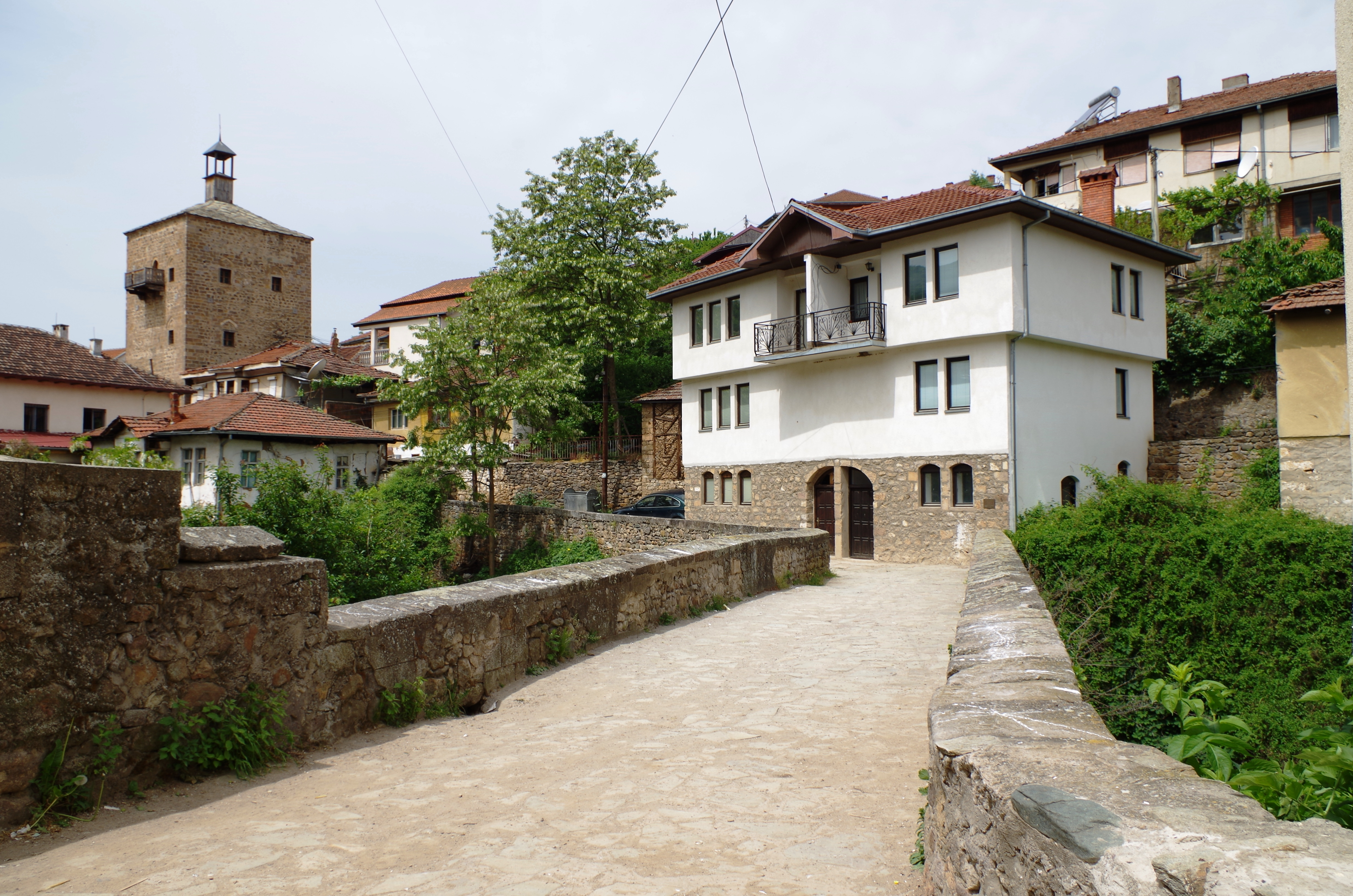
North-eastern view of the tower

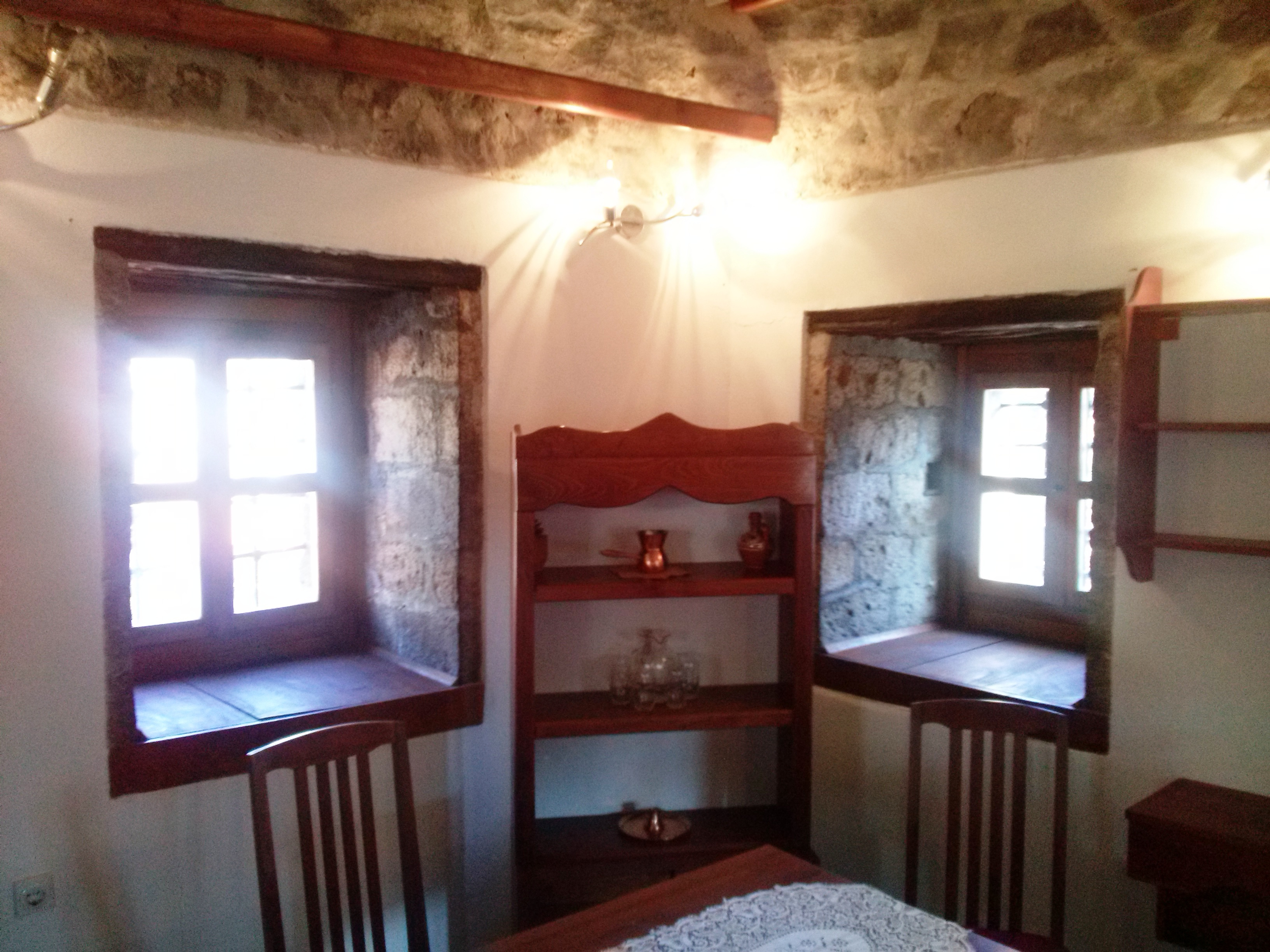
Exhibit in the tower

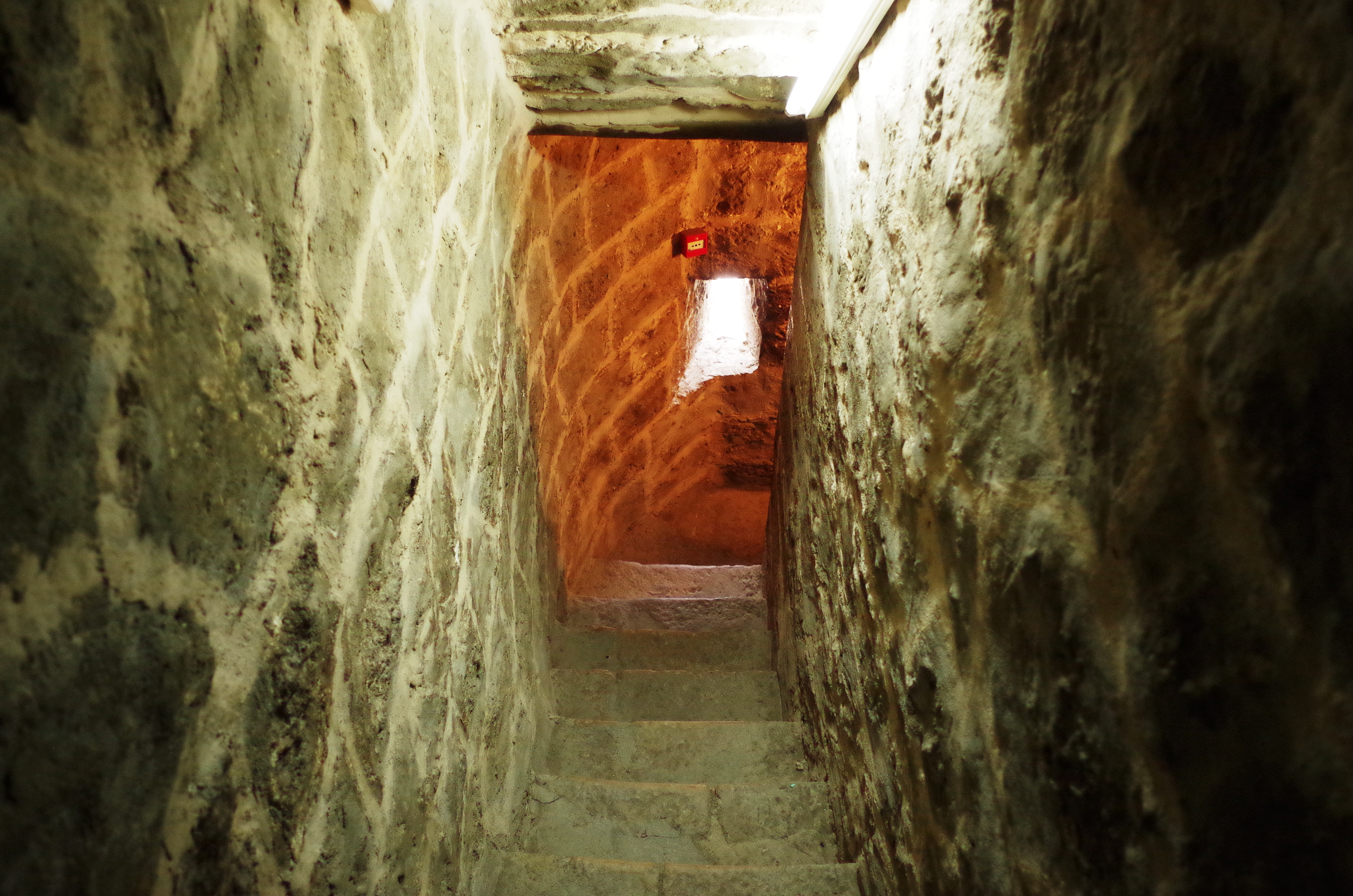
Interior of the entrance to the tunnel below the tower

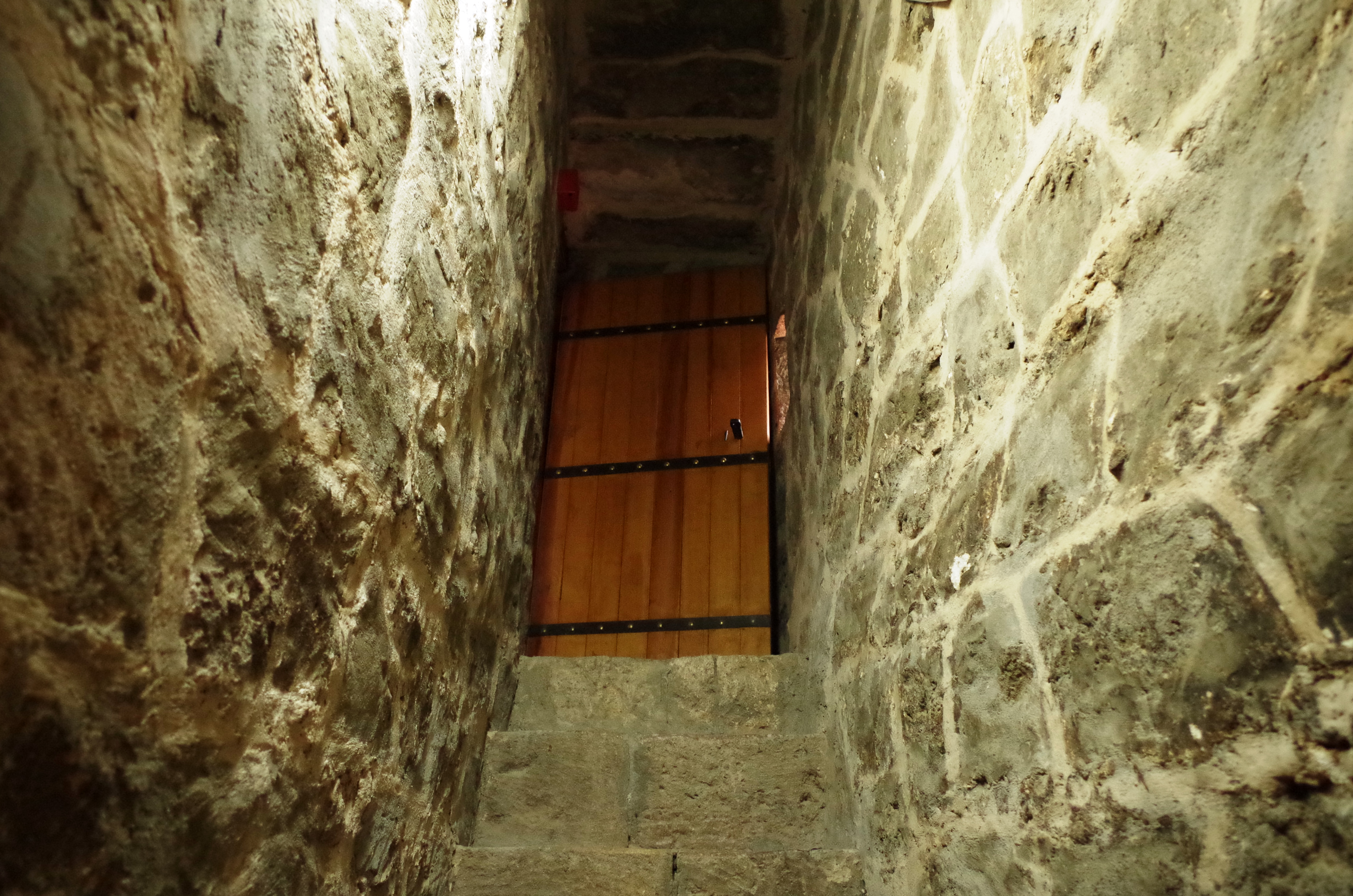
Interior of the entrance to the tunnel below the tower
