= List of Serbs of Croatia =

This is a list of notable Serbs of Croatia.

== Arts ==
- Ratko Adamović, writer
- Dragan Aleksić, poet, author, and journalist
- Stojan Aralica, painter
- Nikola Arsenović, designer and illustrator
- Slavka Atanasijević, pianist and composer
- Vojin Bakić, sculptor
- Lujo Bakotić, writer
- Matija Ban, poet and playwright
- Zoran Bognar, poet
- Marko Car, writer
- Ivo Ćipiko, novelist
- Bora Ćosić, writer
- Dragomir Čumić, actor
- Arsen Dedić, singer
- Vladan Desnica, writer
- Arsen Diklić, writer and screenwriter
- Bogdan Diklić, actor
- Jovan Došenović, philosopher, poet, and translator
- Dušan Džamonja, sculptor
- Božidarka Frajt, actress
- Jovan Isailović, Jr., painter
- Vojin Jelić, poet
- Ignjat Job, painter
- Đorđe Kadijević, film director
- Pero Kvrgić, actor
- Miljen Kljaković, production designer
- Boris Komnenić, actor
- Joakim Marković, painter
- Simo Matavulj, novelist
- Danilo Medaković, writer, journalist, and publisher
- Ljubomir Micić, poet and writer
- Veljko Milićević, writer, translator, publicist, and journalist
- Milan Milišić, writer
- Boris Miljković, film director
- Marko Murat, painter
- Stefan von Novaković, writer and publisher
- Petar Omčikus, painter
- Zaharije Orfelin, polymath
- Milorad Pavić, writer
- Božidar Petranović, author, scholar, and journalist
- Branka Petrić, actress
- Suzana Petričević, actress
- Branko Ve Poljanski, poet
- Medo Pucić, writer and politician
- Branko Radičević, poet
- Jovan Radulović, writer
- Simeon Roksandić, sculptor
- Toma Rosandić, sculptor
- Josif Runjanin, composer
- Slobodan Selenić, writer
- Živko Stojsavljević, painter
- Rade Šerbedžija, actor
- Nikola Škorić, comedian
- Marko Tajčević, composer
- Renata Ulmanski, actress
- Neda Ukraden, singer
- Vladimir Velmar-Janković, writer
- Grigorije Vitez, poet and novelist
- Ivo Vojnović, writer
- Mihailo Vukdragović, composer

== Medieval nobility ==
- Katarina Branković, princess
- Jelena Nemanjić Šubić, princess

== Military ==
- Miloš Božanović, military commander and Serbian Minister of Army
- Rade Bulat, Yugoslav Partisan
- Emanuel Cvjetićanin, Austro-Hungarian Field Marshal Lieutenant
- Simo Dubajić, Yugoslav Partisan
- Momčilo Đujić, Chetnik commander
- Đura Horvatović, Serbian general and Minister of Army
- Stojan Janković, uskok
- Stjepan Jovanović, military commander
- Veljko Kadijević, Yugoslav admiral
- Filip Kljajić, Yugoslav Partisan
- Rade Končar, Yugoslav Partisan
- Branko Mamula, Yugoslav admiral and Minister of Defence
- Vuk Mandušić, harambaša
- Janko Mitrović, harambaša
- Mile Mrkšić, Yugoslav colonel and general of the Serbian Army of Krajina
- Mile Novaković, general of the Serbian Army of Krajina
- Omar Pasha, Ottoman field marshal
- Zdravko Ponoš, Serbian general and the Chief of the General Staff of the Serbian Armed Forces
- Dragutin Prica, Austro-Hungarian and Yugoslav admiral
- Stevo Rađenović, Chetnik commander
- Gavrilo Rodić, Austrian and Austro-Hungarian general
- Raoul Stojsavljevic, Austro-Hungarian flying ace
- Cvijan Šarić, harambaša
- Stevan Šupljikac, Duke of Serbian Vojvodina
- Vasilije Trbić, Chetnik commander in Macedonia

== Politics ==
- Božidar Adžija, communist activist
- Milan Babić, President of the Republic of Serbian Krajina
- Sava Bjelanović, politician
- Jovanka Broz, First Lady of Yugoslavia
- Goran Hadžić, President of the Republic of Serbian Krajina
- Željko Jovanović, politician
- Nikola Krestić, Speaker of the Croatian Sabor
- Miodrag Linta, activist
- Mirko Marjanović, Prime Minister of Serbia
- Milan Martić, President of the Republic of Serbian Krajina
- Aleksandar Martinović, Serbian Minister of Agriculture and State Administration and Local Self-Government
- Bogdan Medaković, Speaker of the Croatian Sabor
- Boris Milošević, the vice-president of the Government of Croatia
- Gojko Nikoliš, diplomat
- Milanka Opačić, politician
- Kata Pejnović, politician
- Adam Pribićević, politician
- Milan Pribićević, politician
- Svetozar Pribićević, politician
- Milorad Pupovac, politician
- Jovan Rašković, politician
- Vojislav Stanimirović, politician
- Stanko Stojčević, president of the League of Communists of Croatia
- Petar Škundrić, Serbian Minister of Energy
- Savo Štrbac, activist
- Ognjeslav Utješenović, politician and writer
- Slobodan Uzelac, the vice-president of the Government of Croatia
- Vladimir Velebit, diplomat
- Beloš Vukanović, Serbian prince, Ban of Croatia

== Religion ==
- Nikodim Busović, Metropolitan of Krka
- Nikanor Ivanović, Metropolitan of Montenegro
- Petar Jovanović, Metropolitan of Belgrade
- Nikodim Milaš, bishop of Dalmatia
- Bishop Nikolaj, Metropolitan of Dabar-Bosna
- German Opačić, Bishop of Bačka
- Pavle, Serbian Patriarch
- Jovan Pavlović, Metropolitan of Zagreb and Ljubljana
- Josif Rajačić, Metropolitan of Sremski Karlovci
- Gerasim Zelić, archimandrite

== Science ==
- Lujo Adamović, botanist
- Vicko Adamović, pedagogue and historian
- Smilja Avramov, legal scholar
- Danilo Blanuša, mathematician and physicist
- Spiridon Brusina, zoologist
- Miloš N. Đurić, philologist
- Antun Fabris, journalist and essayist
- Jovan Gavrilović, historian
- Nikola Hajdin, construction engineer
- Jevrem Jezdić, historian
- Dejan Jović, political science scholar
- Jovan Karamata, mathematician
- Milan Kašanin, art historian
- Đuro Kurepa, mathematician
- Svetozar Kurepa, mathematician
- Dejan Medaković, art historian
- Mihailo Merćep, aviation pioneer
- Milutin Milanković, geophysicist and civil engineer
- Sava Mrkalj, linguist
- Gajo Petrović, philosopher
- Milan Rešetar, linguist and historian
- Pavle Solarić, linguist, geographer, archaeologist
- Nikola Tesla, inventor, mechanical engineer, and electrical engineer
- Vladimir Varićak, mathematician and theoretical physicist
- Stefan Vujanovski, education reformer
- Vid Vuletić Vukasović, writer
- Dušan Vuksan, pedagogue and historian
- Luko Zore, philologist

== Sports ==
- Dragan Andrić, water polo player
- Vladimir Beara, football player
- Mira Bjedov, basketball player
- Novica Bjelica, volleyball player
- Milan Borjan, football player
- Goran Bunjevčević, football player
- Borislav Cvetković, football player
- Zvjezdan Cvetković, football player and manager
- Nenad Čanak, basketball player and coach
- Slobodanka Čolović, track and field athlete
- Miloš Degenek, football player
- Ognjen Dobrić, basketball player
- Jelena Dokić, tennis player
- Tanja Dragić, paralympic athlete
- Ratomir Dujković, football player and manager
- Zoran Erceg, basketball player
- Ivan Ergić, football player
- Milan Gajić, football player
- Đorđe Ivanović, football player
- Goran Jagar, rower
- Branko Kokir, handball player
- Đorđe Lavrnić, handball player
- Danijel Ljuboja, football player
- Milan Mačvan, basketball player
- Božidar Maljković, basketball player and coach
- Predrag Manojlović, water polo player
- Aleks Marić, basketball player
- Dragana Marinković, volleyball player
- Siniša Mihajlović, football player and manager
- Damir Mikec, shooter
- Vladimir Milić, athlete
- Petar Nadoveza, football player and manager
- Milan Nenadić, sports wrestler
- Milan Neralić, fencer and olympian
- Radivoje Ognjanović, football player and manager
- Sandra Paović, table tennis player
- Kosta Perović, basketball player
- Ilija Petković, football player and manager
- Nikola Plećaš, basketball player
- Dado Pršo, football player
- Duško Savanović, basketball player
- Peja Stojaković, basketball player,
- Jasna Šekarić, shooter
- Dragan Travica, volleyball player
- Ljubomir Travica, volleyball player and coach
- Petar Trifunović, chess player
- Dušan Vemić, tennis player and coach
- Vladimir Vujasinović, water polo player and coach
- Nemanja Zelenović, handball player

== Other ==
- Lazar Bačić, merchant and philanthropist
- Slavko Ćuruvija, journalist
- Miroslav Lazanski, journalist
- Vladimir Matijević, industrialist and philanthropist
- Mirjana Rakić, journalist

== See also ==
- List of Serbs
- List of Serbs of Bosnia and Herzegovina
- List of Serbs of Montenegro
- List of Serbs of North Macedonia

== Sources ==
- Slavko Gavrilović (1993). Iz istorije Srba u Hrvatskoj, Slavoniji i Ugarskoj: XV-XIX vek. Filip Višnjić. ISBN 9788673631264.
- Бујадин Рудич (1993). Срби у Хрватској: насељаване, број и територијални размешта. Ун-т у Београду. ISBN 978-86-419-0128-3.
- Лујо Бакотић (1939). Срби у Далмацији, од пада млетачке републике до уједињења. Издавачко и књижарско предузеће Г. Кон.
- Одбор САНУ за историју Срба у Хрватској (1989). ЗБОРНИК О СРБИМА У ХРВАТСКОЈ. Vol. 1. Belgrade: SANU.
- Vasilije Đ Krestić (2010). Историја Срба у Хрватској и Славонији 1848-1914. Zavod za Udžbenike. ISBN 978-86-17-17047-7.
- Jačov, Marko (1990). Srbi u mletačko-turskim ratovima u XVII veku. Sveti arhijerejski sinod Srpske pravoslavne crkve.
- Škiljan, Filip (2009). "Znameniti Srbi u Hrvatskoj" (PDF). Zagreb. Archived from the original (PDF) on 2018-09-27.
