= Dimitrije Pepić =

Duke Dimitrije Pepić (died 1566), was a 16th-century endower and benefactor from what is today, modern day Kratovo, North Macedonia.

== Dukes of Kratovo ==
Dimitrije Pepić belonged to the most famous family of mid 16th century Kratovo. The vicinity of the town was very rich in various ores and had famous mines. The exploitation of these mines was leased by the Ottoman authorities and in 16th century we find the Pepić family as the renters of Kratovo mines. The most famous men in family were brothers Nikola, Dimitrije and Grigorije. The wealthy Dimitrije Pepić bore the title of knez (duke) and was the most important person in the town, lord to its Christian inhabitants with a wide jurisdiction in things not of direct concern to the Ottomans (family, Church etc.). This is best seen from an inscription of an evangeliary written in 1563 „in the days of most honored and Christ-loving master Duke Dimitrije“ (u danima blagočastivog i hristoljubivog gospodara kneza Dimitrija).

After Pepićs the next family of Kratovo Dukes was Mihailo Bojčić, of whom brothers Andrija and Nikola are mentioned in 1581.

== Donations to the Church ==
Duke Dimitrije, together with his brothers, was among the biggest donors of the Ohrid Archbishopric. In 1550 Dimitrije became the oeconomus of the Archbishopric, a prestigious duty reserved only for the most influential men.

Dimitrije renovated or donated many Orthodox monasteries, such as Lesnovo (together with his brother Nikola), Saint Nicholas in Toplica, Slepče (1543), Treskavec, Prečista (near Kičevo) and Saint Panteleimon on Mount Athos. A portrait of Dimitrije Pepić as the endower of the monastery can be seen in the monastery of Prečista (Sveta Bogorodica Prečista Kičevska).
