= Konjuh, Kratovo Municipality =

Konjuh Коњух
- Village
- Location within North Macedonia
- Coordinates: 42.081708°N 21.959191°E
- Country: North Macedonia
- Region: Northeastern
- Municipality: Kratovo

Population (2002)
  - Total: 150
- Time zone: UTC+1 (CET)
  - Summer (DST): UTC+2 (CEST)

Konjuh (Macedonian: Коњух) is a village in the municipality of Kratovo, North Macedonia.

== Demographics ==
According to the 2002 census, the village had a total of 150 inhabitants. Ethnic groups in the village include:

- Macedonians 150
