= Vakuf, Kratovo Municipality =

Vakuf Вакуф
- Village
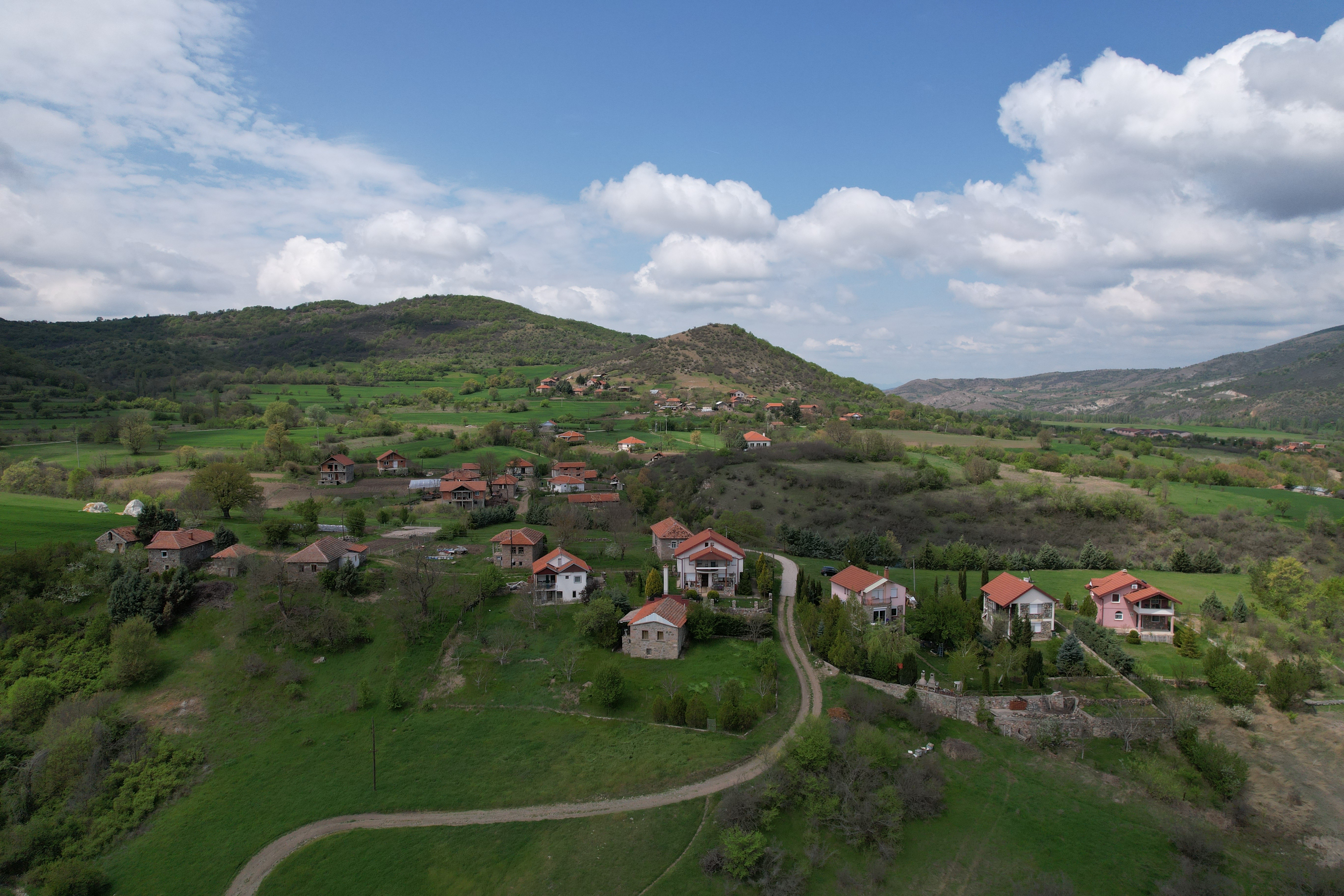
- View of the village

- Location within North Macedonia
- Coordinates: 42.068810°N 22.044222°E
- Country: North Macedonia
- Region: Northeastern
- Municipality: Kratovo

Population (2002)
  - Total: 122
- Time zone: UTC+1 (CET)
  - Summer (DST): UTC+2 (CEST)
- Website: .

Vakuf (Macedonian: Вакуф) is a village in the municipality of Kratovo, North Macedonia.

== Demographics ==
According to the 2002 census, the village had a total of 122 inhabitants, all of whom are ethnic Macedonians.
