= Milorad Simić =

Milorad Simić (Serbian Cyrillic: Милорад Симић; born 5 June 1946) is a Serbian philologist, linguist, lexicographer and computer scientist. He was born in Obadi (Bosnia and Herzegovina) and finished gymnasium in Srebrenica, College of Pedagogy in Šabac, and Faculty of Philology and magister studies in Belgrade. Since 1972 he is employed at the Institute of Serbian Language at the Serbian Academy of Science and Arts (SANU). He is an editor of the SANU Dictionary, and founder of the Srbosof agency specialized in linguistical computer science. He is a member of the council of Project Rastko since 1997. He has authored digital dictionaries and linguistical software. He was awarded the Order of Despot Stefan Lazarević by the Serbian Orthodox Church in March 2015.
