= Pelagonitissa =

Type of depiction of the Virgin Mary

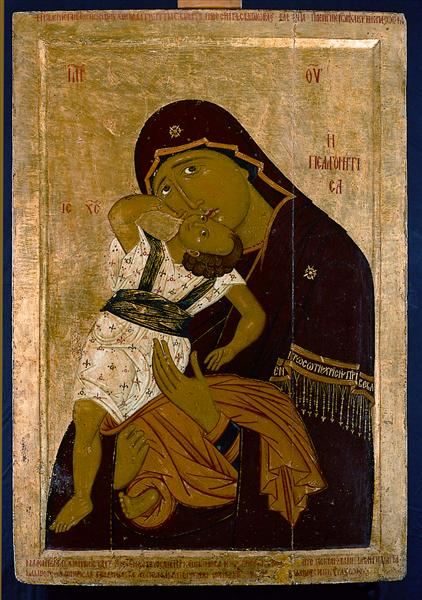
Pelagonitissa painting formerly in Zrze Monastery

The Pelagonitissa (also known as "The Virgin with the Playing Child") is a type of depiction of the Virgin Mary (often in icons) in which the Virgin holds an infant Jesus in an abrupt movement, his head back and grabbing onto her.

Pelagonitissa was developed in the twelfth and thirteenth centuries in the Byzantine Empire, particularly in Macedonia. The name Pelagonitissa refers to the city of Bitola, previously known as Pelagonia.

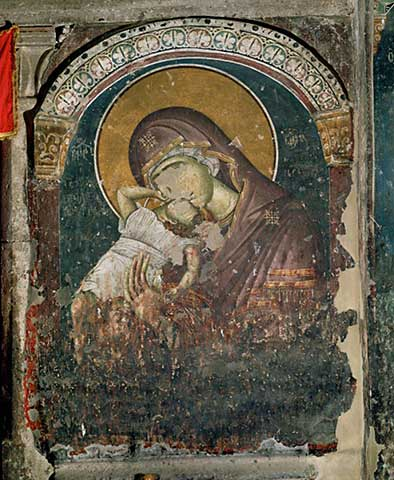
Pelagonitissa painting in the Church of St. George, Staro Nagoričane

Pelagonitissa is often seen as a variant of the Eleusa icon in which the infant Jesus rests. One of the best-known examples is in the Church of St. George, Staro Nagoričane, restored by the Serbian king Milutin in the 13th century.

== See also ==
- List of Theotokos of St. Theodore icons
- Marian devotions
- Marian art
