= Zrze Monastery =

Monastery in North Macedonia

Coordinates: 41°31′17″N 21°20′30″E

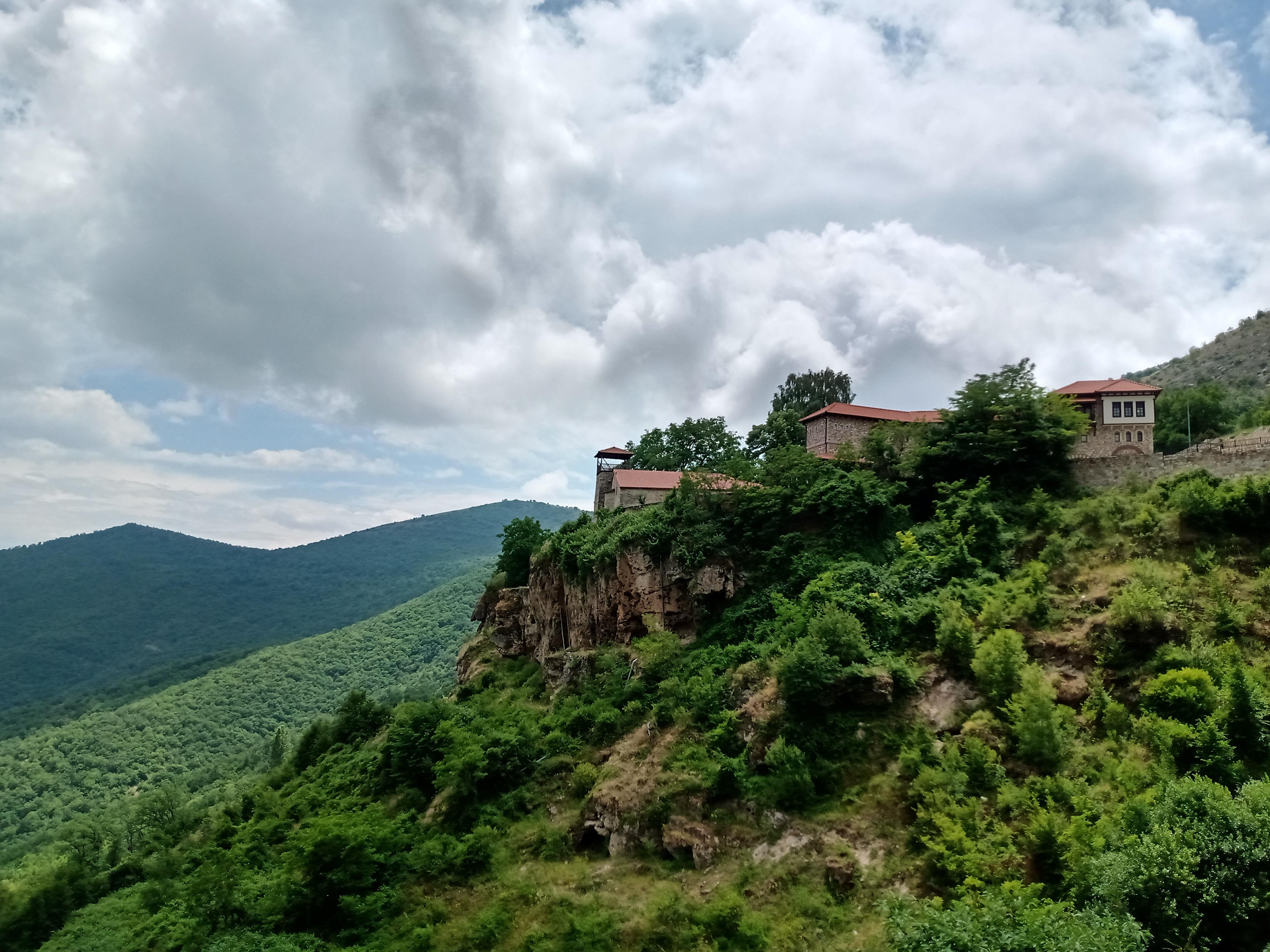
View from below

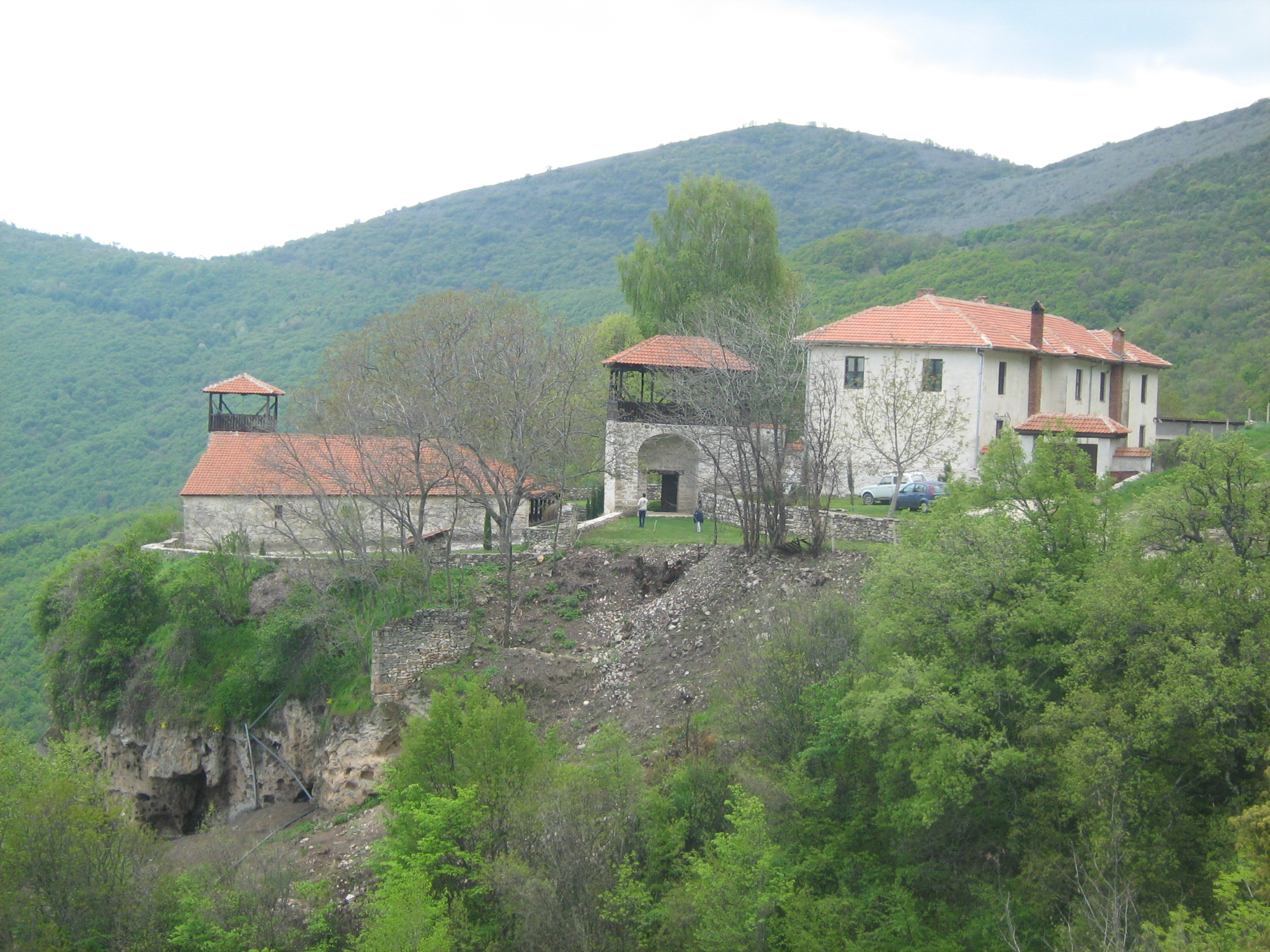
View to the whole complex

Zrze Monastery is located near the village of Zrze, approx. 25 km north-west of Prilep (Macedonian: Прилеп), Republic of North Macedonia.

The numerous remnants of the ancient period-pillars, basilica remains, and other exponents speak of the rich cultural tradition, of this area. Traditionally the monks lived in carved-out stone hollows, from the mountainside cliffs. This is believed to date back to the 3rd and 4th centuries.

Today, the Zrze monastery complex consists of the church "St. Petar and Pavle", the inns, and several accessory rooms. The church has been renovated several times, and the painting is preserved only in fragments. In the 14th century, the church walls were painted with paintings of extraordinary artistic value.

Dated from 1421, the icon of the Holy Virgin Pelagonitissa, now part of the iconostasis inside the Church of Saints Peter and Paul, is considered one of the last outstanding achievements of icon painting, a representation of the then still-living Byzantine iconography. Its author Makarije Zograf worked on the icon in the monastery of the village of Zrze. Makarije Zograf and his brother Metropolitan Jovan Zograf cared for the monastery endowment until it was transferred to Constantine, the village head (kmet).

Under the monastery are the monk cells, and their high number indicates the rich life of the monks, who belonged to the highest monastical order.

Zrze is a fully functioning monastery, in line with the faith of the Macedonian Orthodox Church.

== Gallery ==
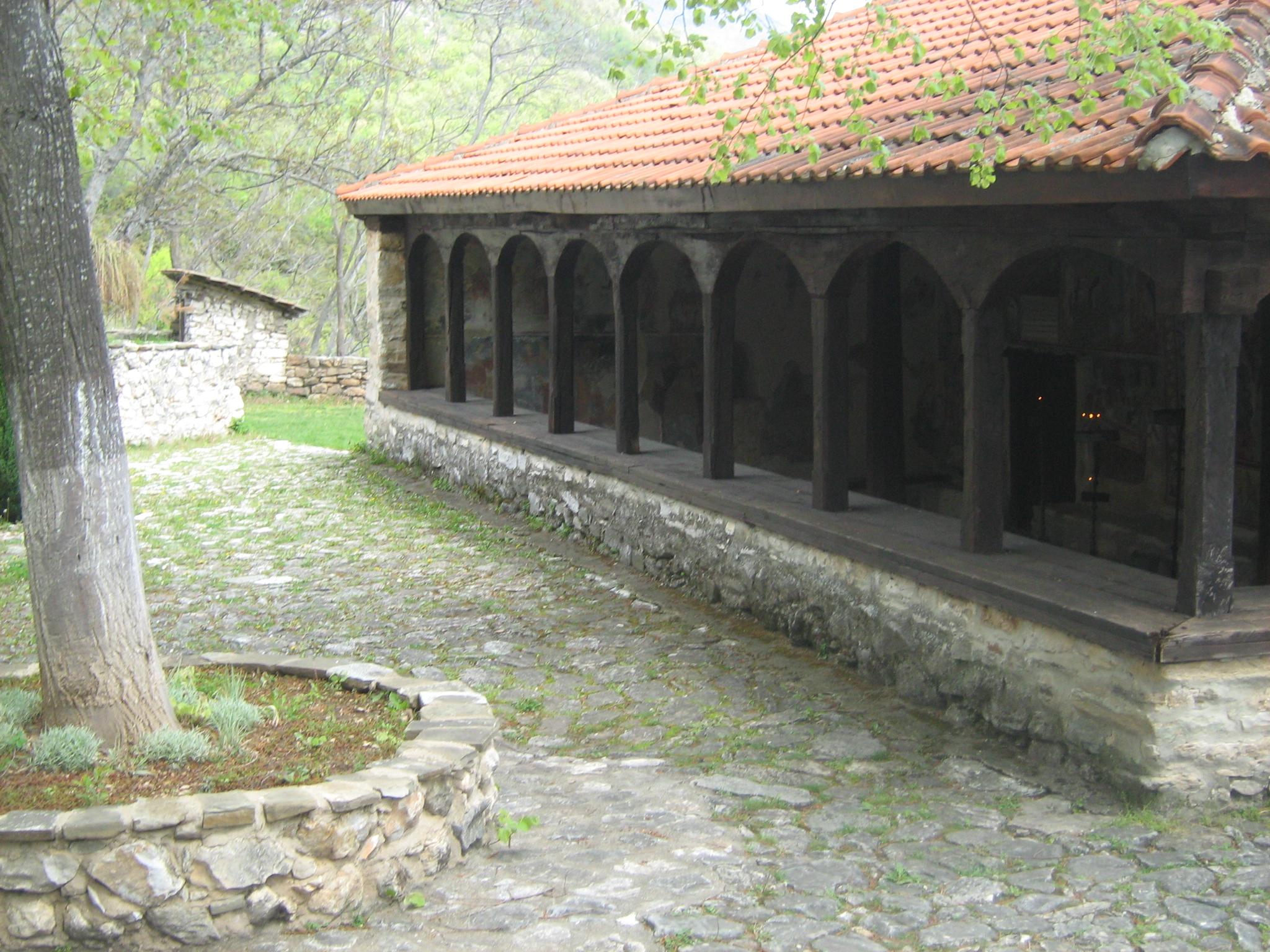
Church of the Transfiguration

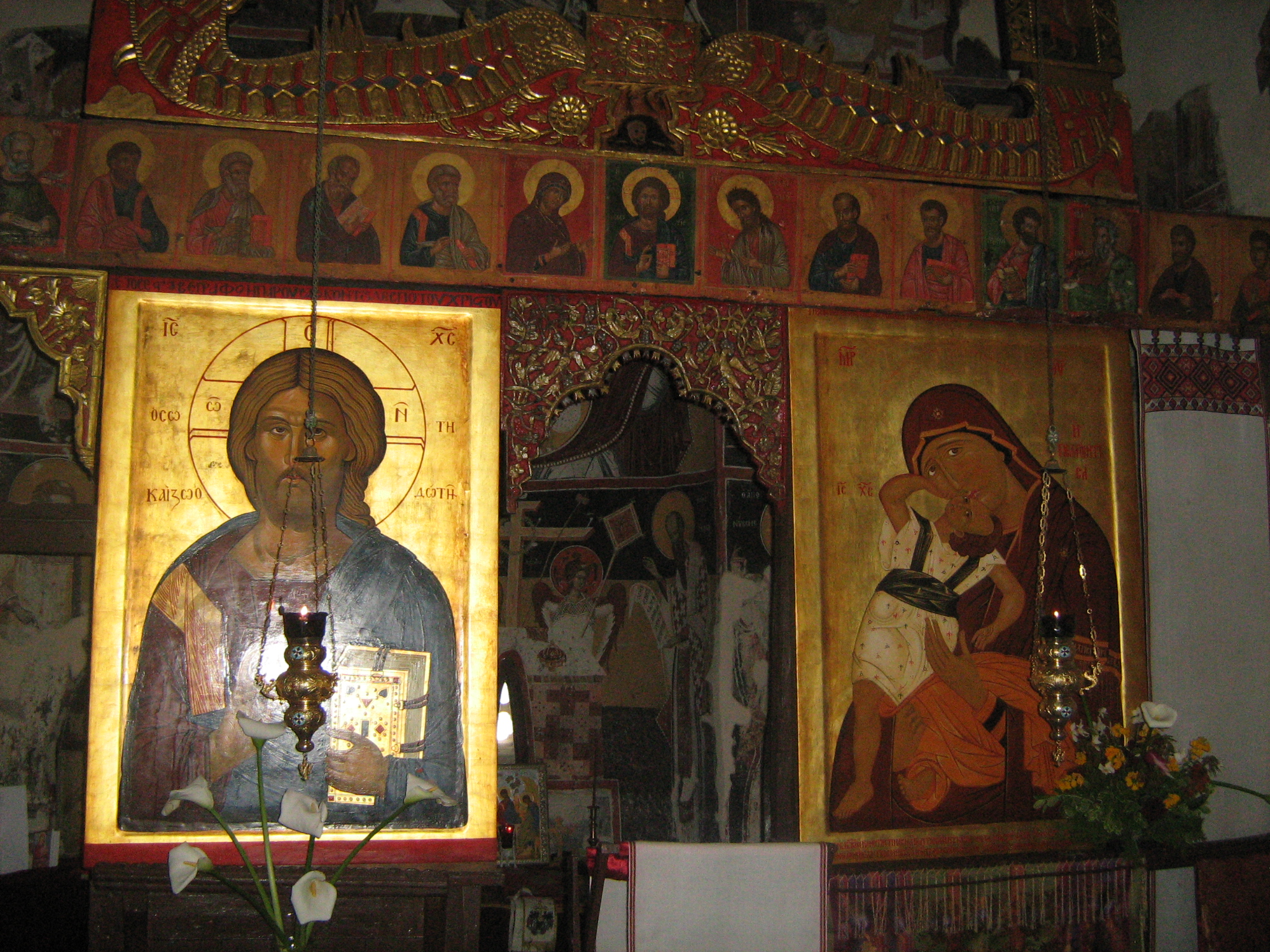
Sts. Peter and Paul Church

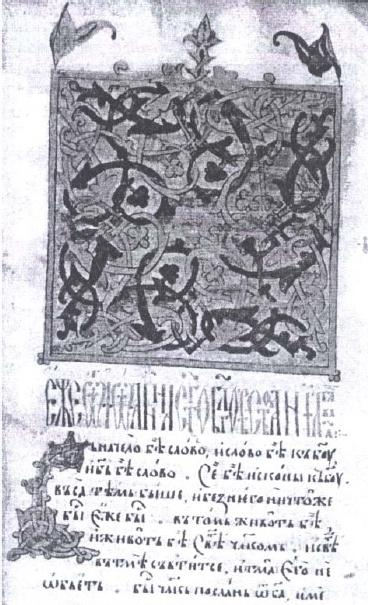
Fragment of Four Gospels book from Zrze, 16-17th century

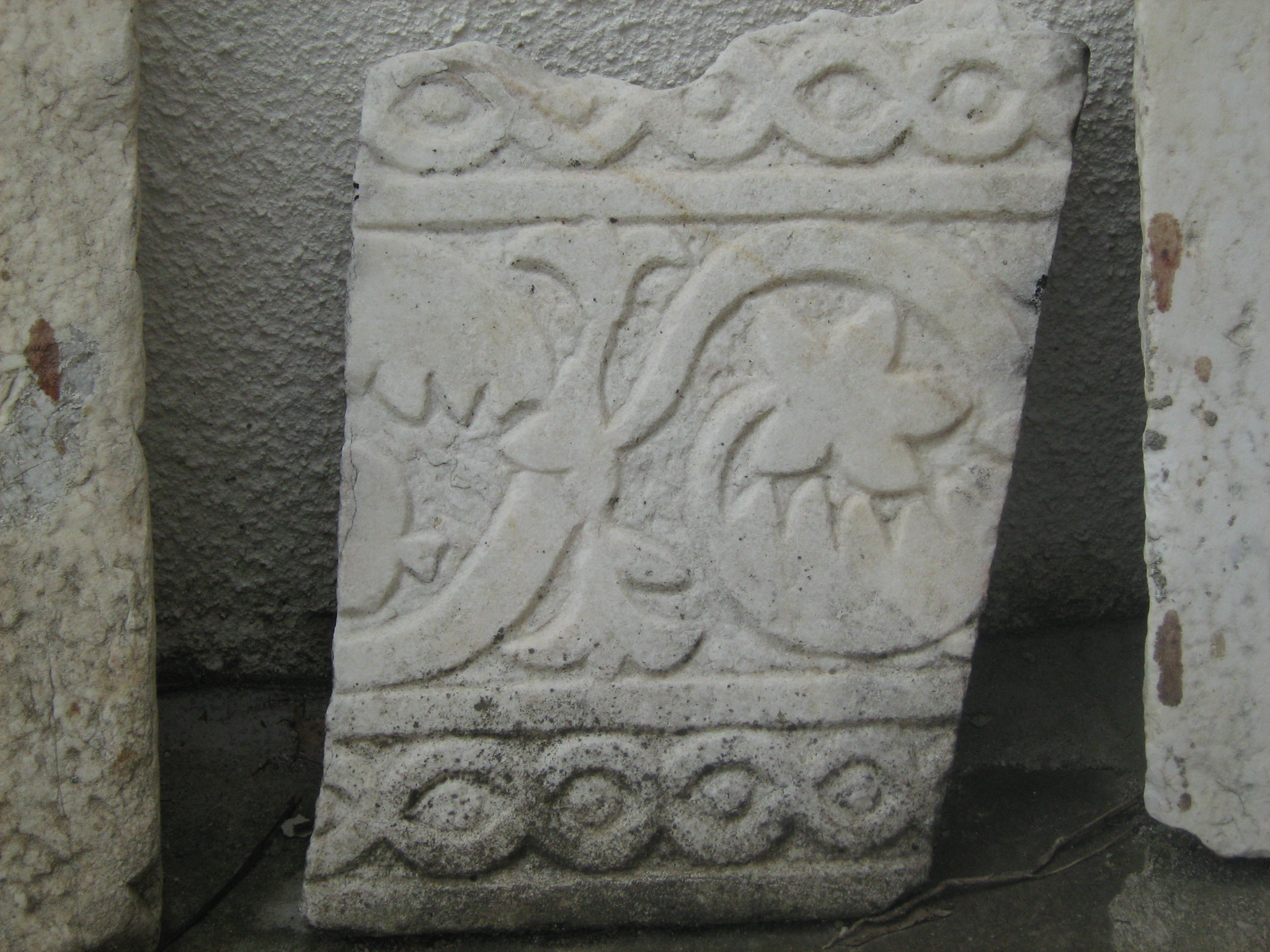
Artifacts from the complex
