= Metropolitan Jovan Zograf =

Medieval Serbian painter

Metropolitan Jovan Zograf was a Serbian monk who lived and worked in the 14th and early 15th centuries in what was then Medieval Serbia, now North Macedonia. He is known only by his baptismal name, Pribila. His father, a builder named Hajko, became a monk and took the name Hariton at the Monastery of Zrze, not far from Prilep. Like his father, Pribila and his brother Prijezda were tonsured as monks in the same monastery. Pribila became known as Jovan, and Prijezda took the name Makarije, later becoming known as Makarije Zograf. Both brothers gained recognition as notable icon painters during their lifetimes.

Monk Jovan was elevated to the rank of Metropolitan in the Serbian Orthodox Church, yet he continued to paint frescoes and icons. His most famous work, "Jesus Christ, Saviour and Life Giver," was painted in 1383 at Zrze, during the rule of Marko Mrnjavčević (1371-1395). Today, the original painting is housed in the Museum of the Republic of North Macedonia in Skopje.

Metropolitan Jovan Zograf lived during the time of Lazar of Serbia and Stefan Lazarević. He had two assistants, monk-painters Grigorije and Aleksije. The latter, Aleksije, signed his work at the Church of the Virgin in the village of Globoko, near Prespa Lake, as "Aleksije, the pupil of Jovan Zograf" at the end of the 14th century.

== See also ==
- Zrze monastery
