= Eleusa icon =

Icon type with the Child pressing cheek of Mary

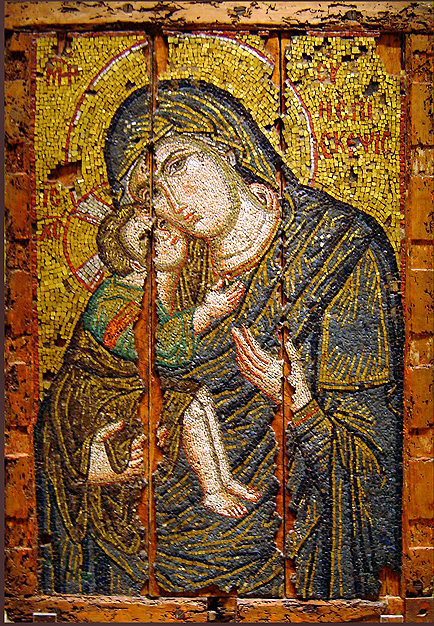
13th-century Byzantine Eleusa mosaic, Athens

The Eleusa (or Eleousa; Greek: Ἐλεούσα – tenderness or showing mercy) is a type of depiction of the Virgin Mary in icons in which the Christ Child is nestled against her cheek. In the Western Church the type is often known as the Virgin of Tenderness.

== Depictions ==
Such icons have been venerated in the Eastern Church for centuries. Similar types of depiction are also found in Madonna paintings in the Western Church where they are called the Madonna Eleusa, or the Virgin of Tenderness. By the 19th century examples such as the Lady of Refuge type (e.g. the Refugium Peccatorum Madonna by Luigi Crosio) were widespread and they were also used in retablos in Mexican art.

In Eastern Orthodoxy the term Panagia Eleousa is often used. The Theotokos of Vladimir and Theotokos of Pochayiv are well-known examples of this type of icon. Eleusa is also used as epithet for describing and praising the Theotokos (Virgin Mary) in the Eastern Orthodox tradition.

While the Eastern Church does not generally create three-dimensional religious art, Eleusa-style reliefs and sculptures, as well as icons, have also been used in the Western Church.

The Pelagonitissa is a variant in which the infant Jesus makes an abrupt movement.

== Gallery ==
=== Eastern icons ===
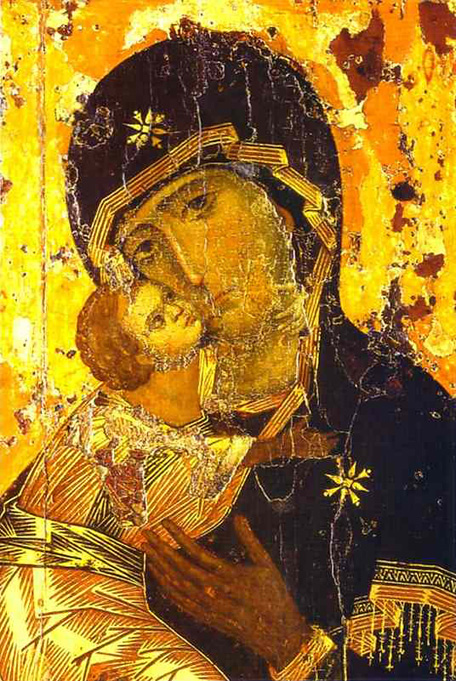
Vladimirskaya

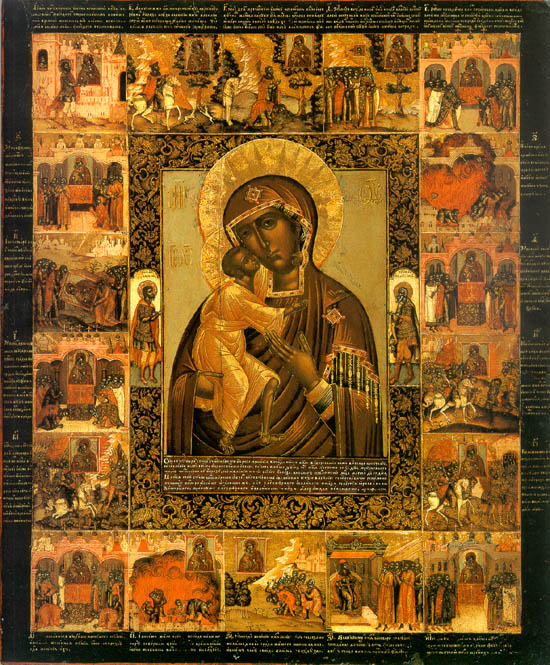
Fyodorovskaya

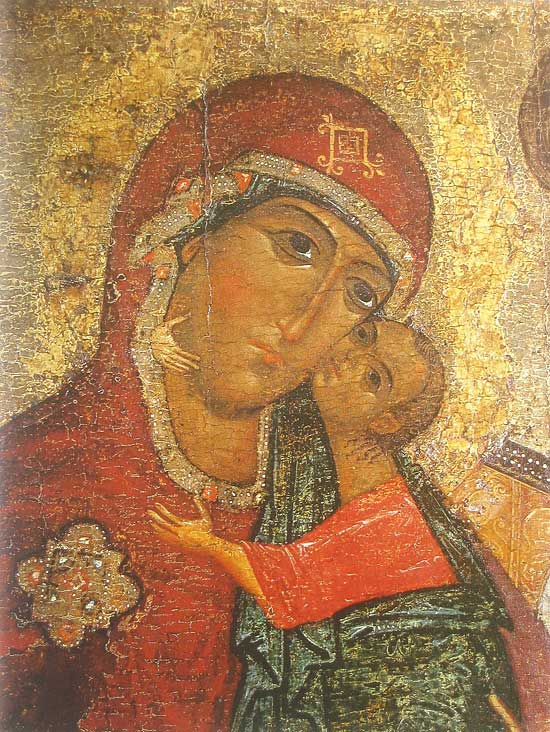
Tolgskaya

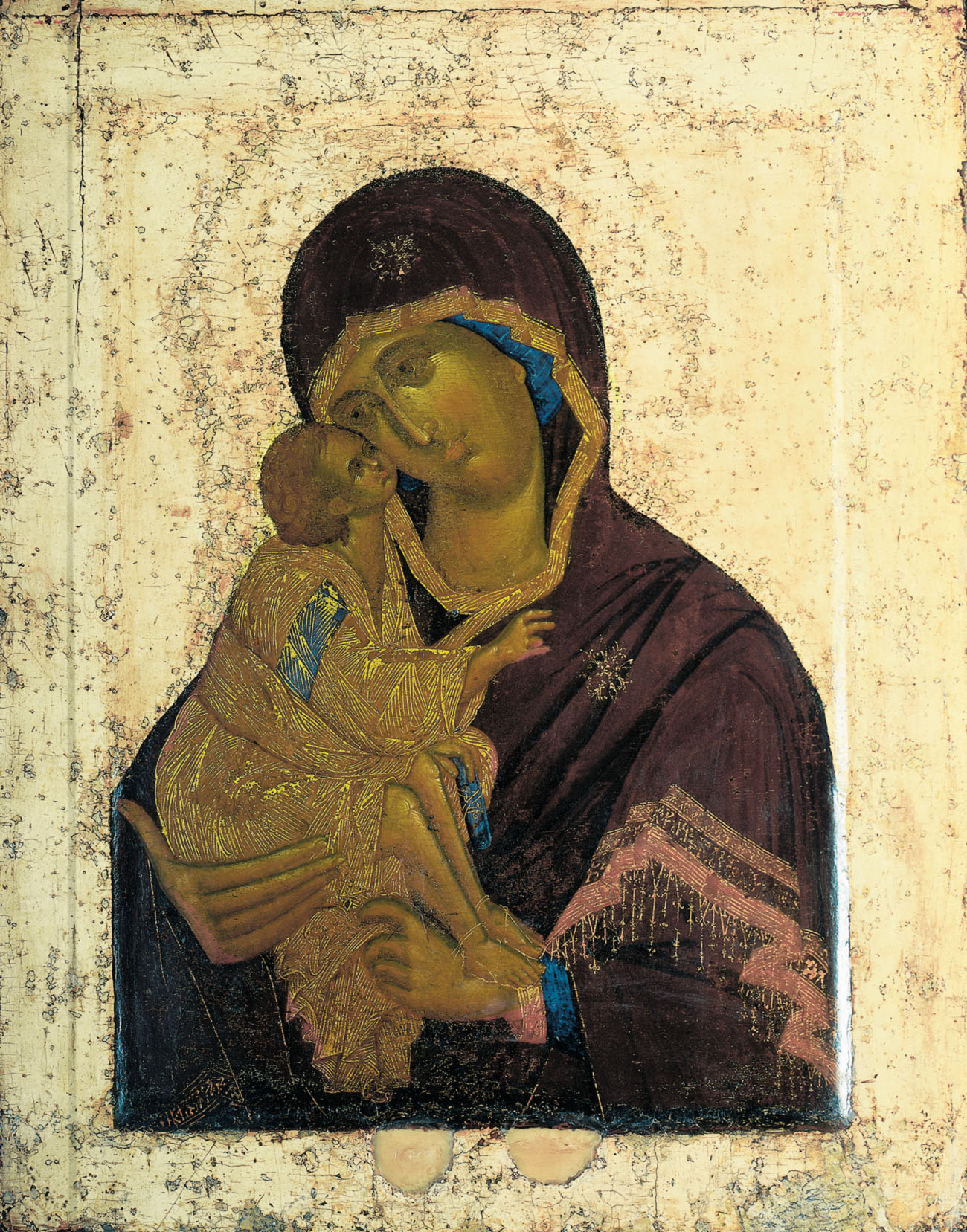
Donskaya

The Virgin Eleousa, Crete, c. 1425, Cleveland Museum of Art

=== Western icons ===
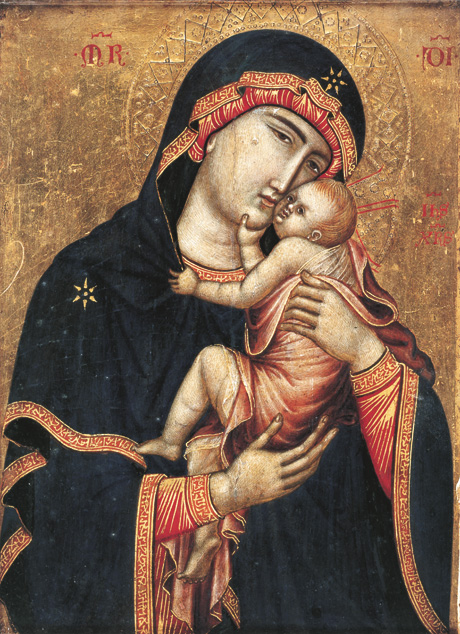
Cambrai Madonna, Italo-Byzantine, c. 1340, Cambrai Cathedral

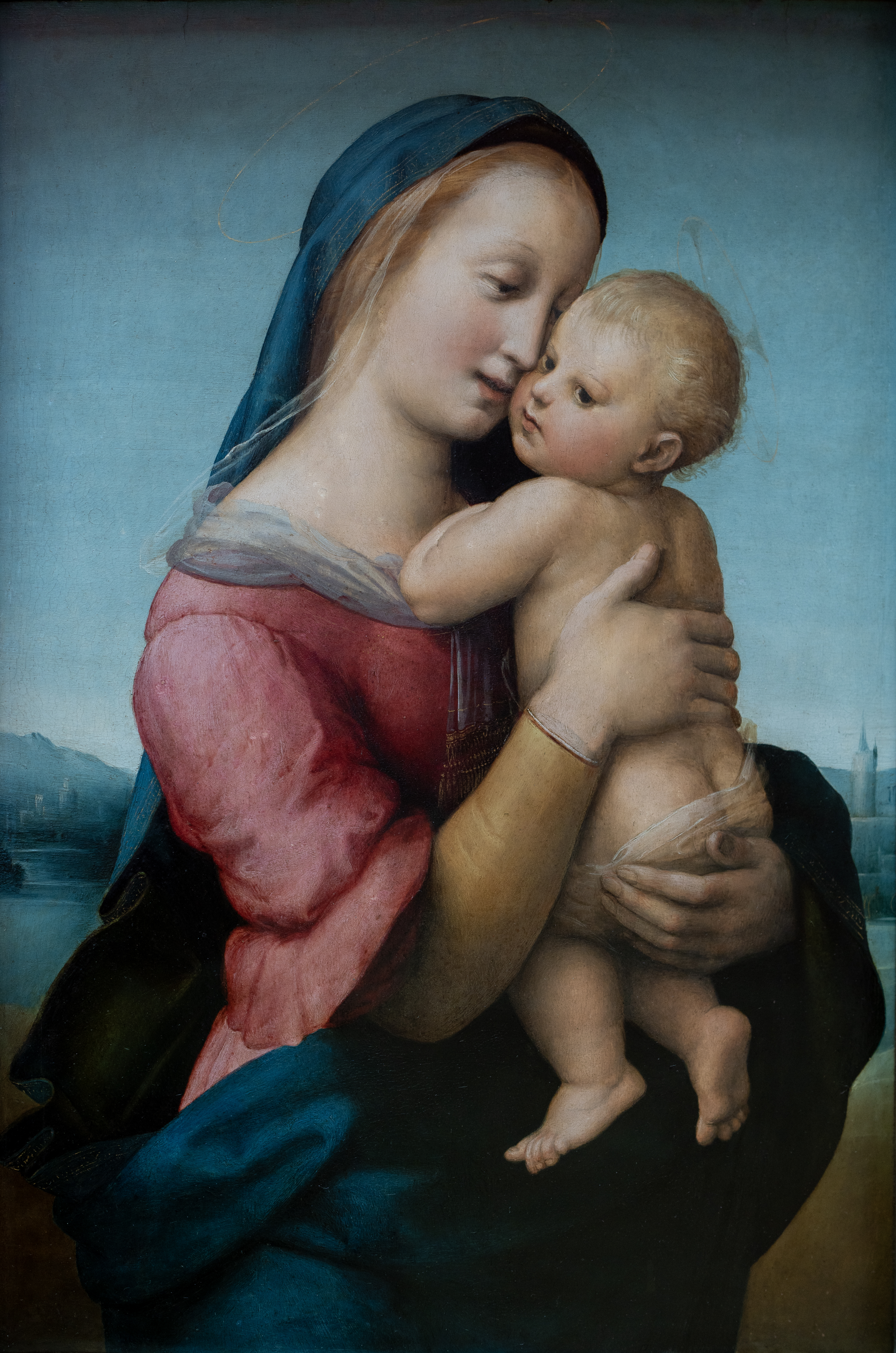
Tempi Madonna, Raphael, 1508, Alte Pinakothek

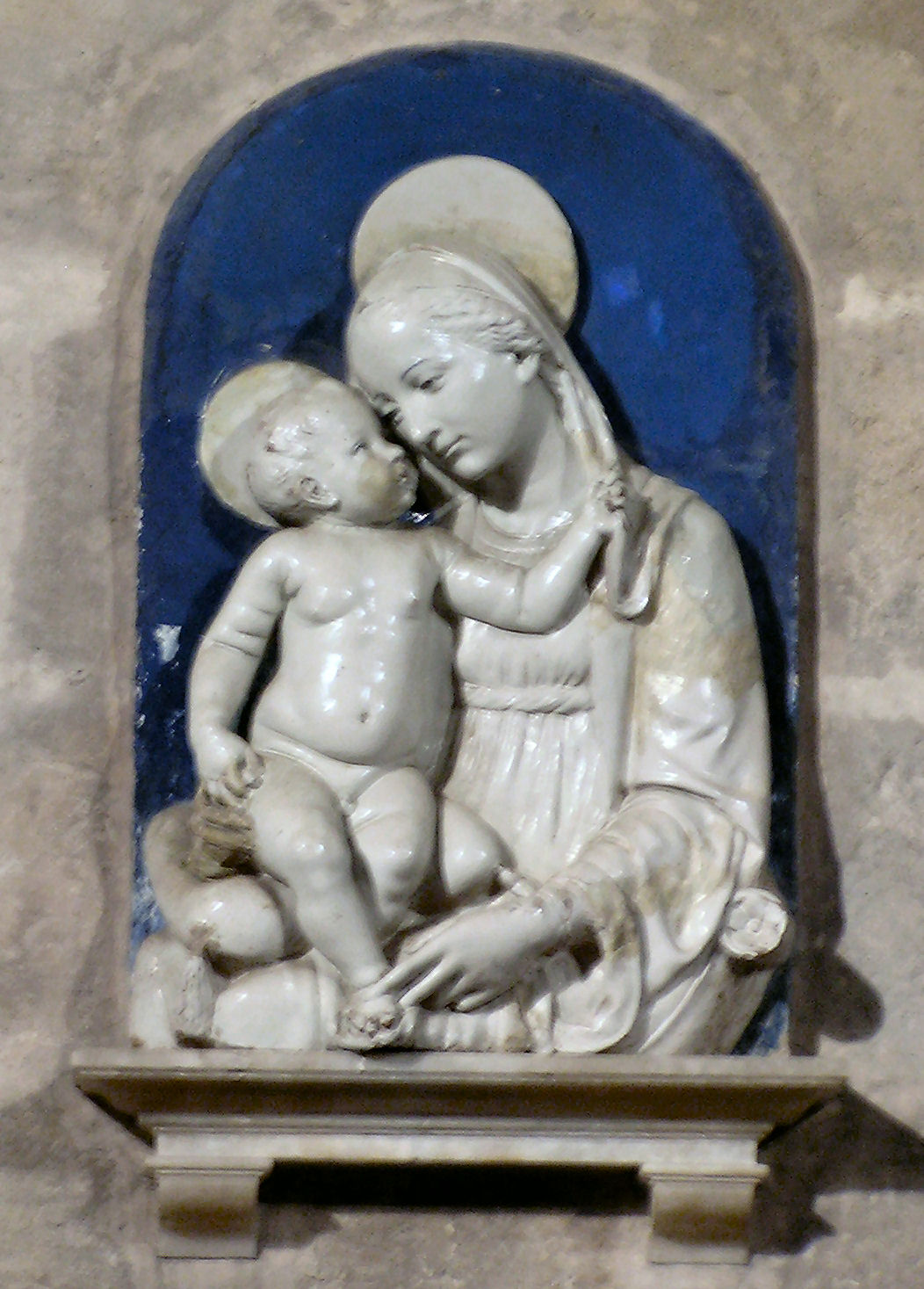
"Eleusa style" Relief by Andrea della Robbia in Seville

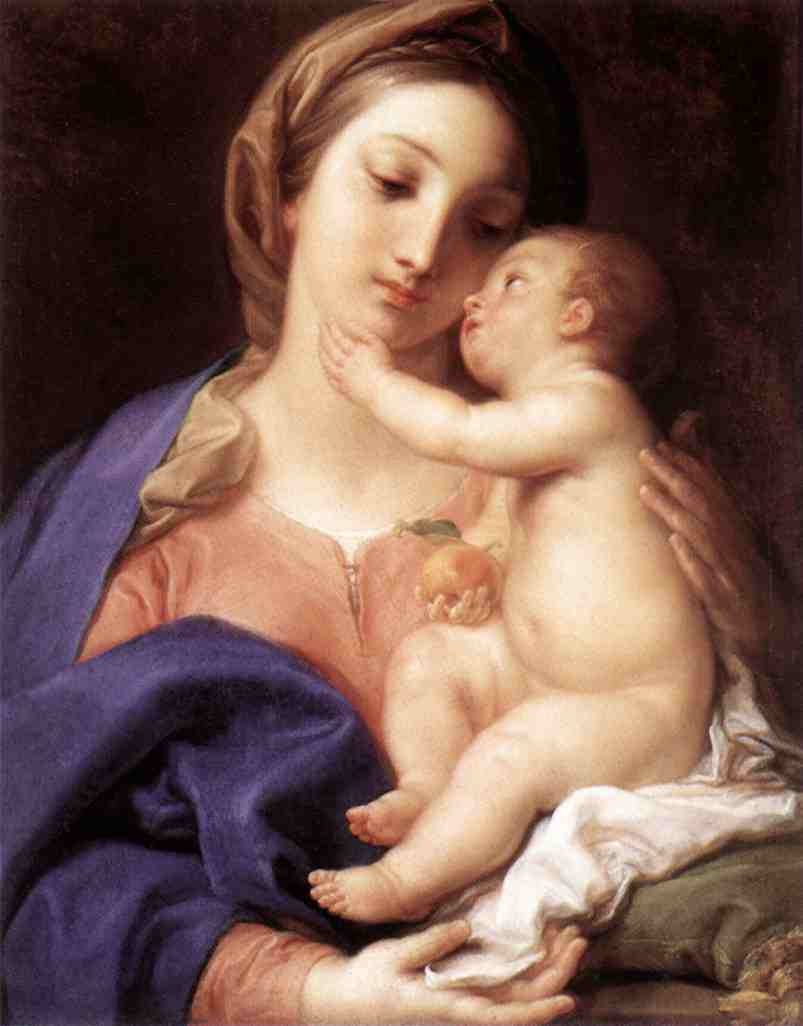
Pompeo Batoni, c. 1742

== See also ==
- List of Theotokos of St. Theodore icons
- Marian devotions
- Marian art
