= Theotokos of Tolga =

Russian Orthodox icon

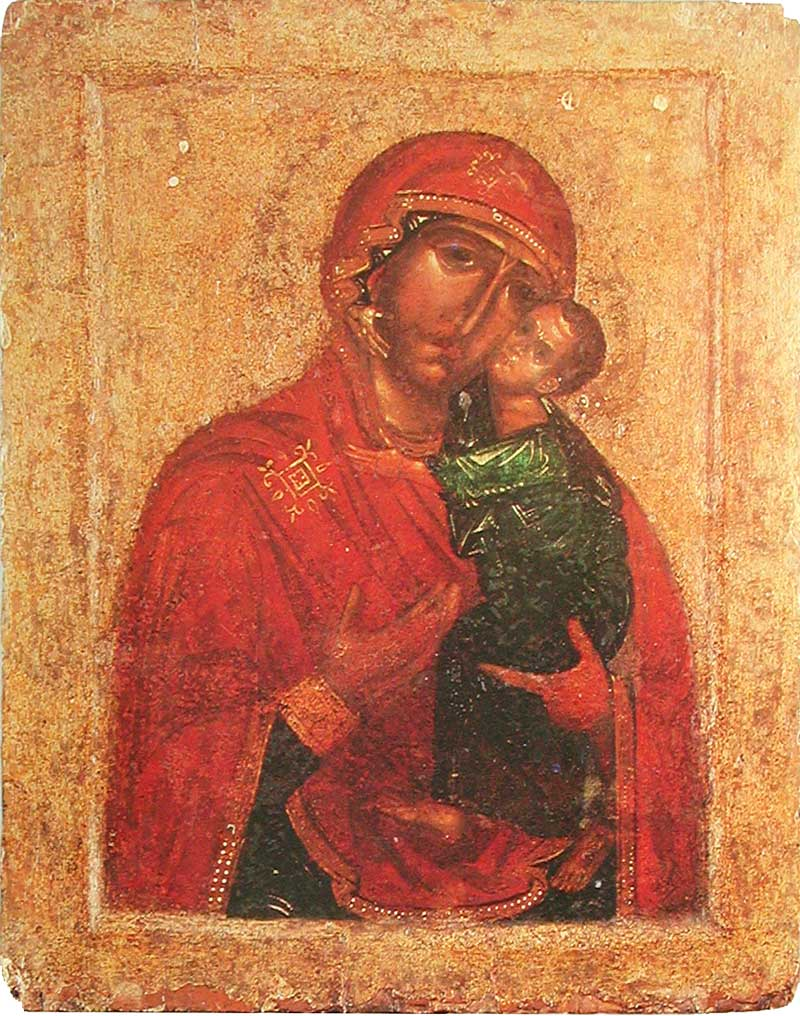
Theotokos of Tolga

The Theotokos of Tolga (Russian: Толгская икона Божией Матери) is a Russian Orthodox icon representing the Virgin Mary (Theotokos) with the infant Jesus Christ. The Theotokos of Tolga, named after the Tolga river in Yaroslavl, is known in three copies created between the end of the 13th and the beginning of the 14th century. They were painted in the Eleusa type. One of them, traditionally called a "Manifested" icon, was manifested to Prokhor, the Bishop of Rostov in 1314.

The icon version of the end of 13th-century (Throne icon or Tolgskaya I) is held in the Tretyakov Gallery, while the Manifested one (also known as Tolgskaya II) is in the Tolga Monastery. Tolgskaya III was created circa 1327. It is currently held in the Russian Museum.

Theotokos of Tolga is referred to as the patroness of the Yaroslavl land.
