= Church of St. George, Staro Nagoričane =

- Црква „Св. Великомаченик Георгиј“
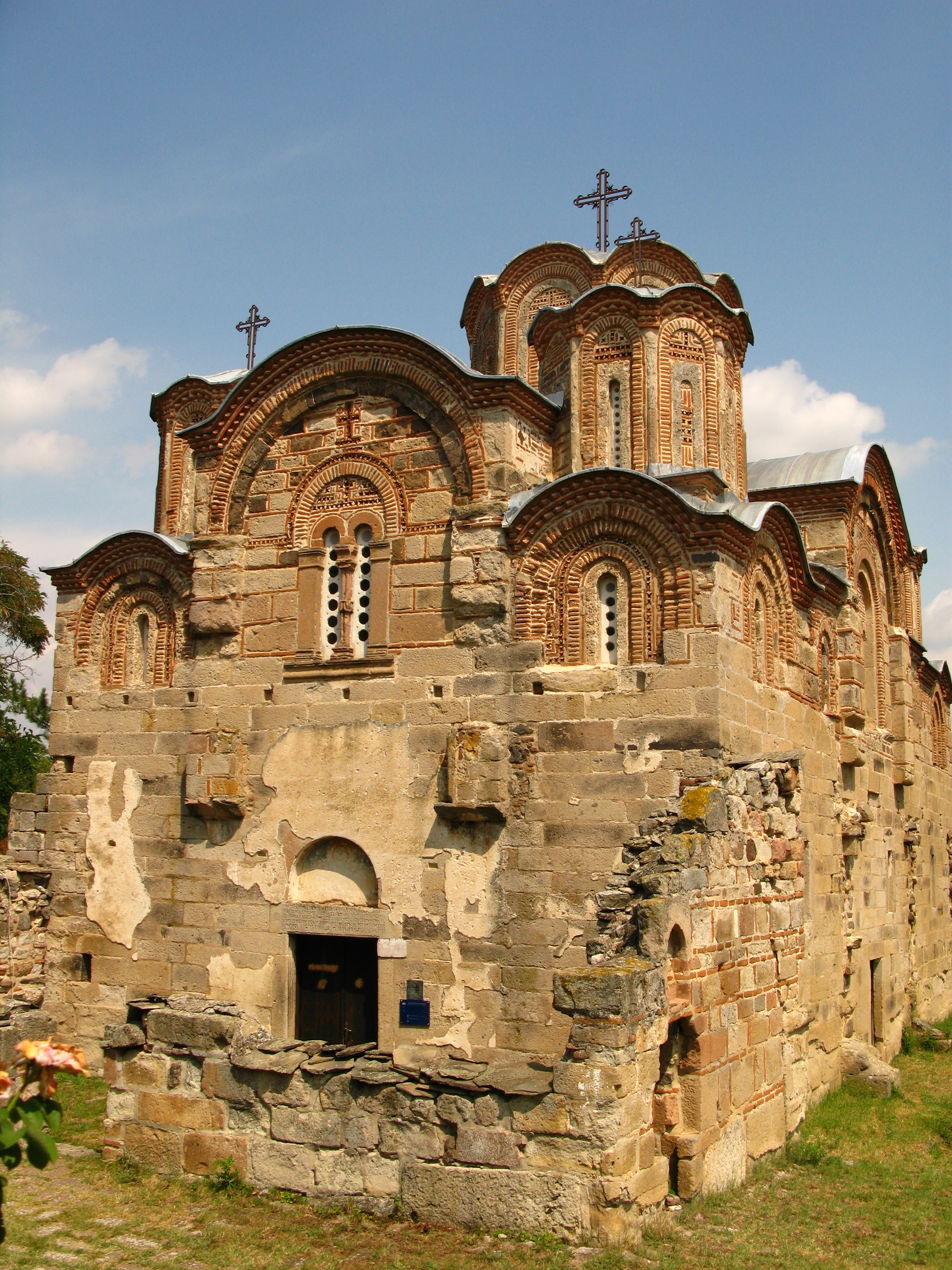
- Church of St. George, Staro Nagoričane
- 42°11′54″N 21°49′43″E
- Location: Kumanovo, Staro Nagoričane
- Country: North Macedonia
- Denomination: Macedonian Orthodoxy

History
- Status: Church
- Founded: 1071
- Founder(s): Romanos IV Diogenes, Stefan Uroš II Milutin of Serbia
- Dedication: St. George

Architecture
- Functional status: Active
- Style: Serbo-Byzantine
- Completed: 1071 _{Reconstruction 1313-1318}

Specifications
- Materials: Brick

Administration
- Province: Kumanovo
- Diocese: Diocese of Polog and Kumanovo

The Church of St. George (Macedonian: Црква "Св. Великомаченик Георгиј", Crkva "Sv. Velikomačenik Georgij" or simply Црква "Свети Ѓорѓи" / Crkva "Sv. Gjorgji"; Serbian: Црква Светог Ђорђа / Crkva Svetog Đorđa) is a Macedonian Orthodox church in the village of Staro Nagoričane, near Kumanovo in North Macedonia, built by medieval Serbian king Stefan Milutin. It is noteworthy both for its architecture and its frescoes. It is considered a 14th-century masterpiece of the Palaiologan era and a key example of Christian heritage in this area.

== Donor ==
An inscription above the western entrance of the church mentions Stefan Uroš II. Milutin (1253-1321) as its donor. His building conversions and donations are also confirmed by archbishop and biographer Danilo II. The donor portrait on the northern wall shows Milutin next to the patron saint George and is characterized by the symbolic exchange of gifts: the emperor presents a model of the church, while George hands over a sword for Milutin's military services. The latter is also addressed in the inscription which refers to the victory over the Turks and therefore gives a hint about the edification of the church in the year 1312/13.

== Architecture ==
The cross-in-square church is complemented by a narthex, while the bema and naos are divided by a stony iconostasis. The sanctuary is flanked by a prothesis (north) and a diaconicon (south). The main dome is supported by an octagonal tambour, whereas pendentives form the transition between those two elements. Another four smaller domes, one at each corner of the church, add to the decoration. The outer narthex is in a very bad condition, meaning just the lower parts of the walls remain. This component was added later, as the church was probably part of an expanding monastery, which faced the problem of lack of space. But there has already existed an inner narthex, separated by two columns with lower arcs than the rest in the monument and by a different iconographic program.

An alternating building design can be noticed at the facade from a height of 5m. The lower part consists of big sandstone blocks, while the upper part is composed of alternating rows of stone and brick, held together by mortar. The brick elements are also used to highlight niches and windows. Another difference can be seen by the shape of the screens. Those in the lower zone are completed by an arc, while those in the upper part have a lintel. This underlines that the church belongs to two different construction phases. The older structures can be dated to the 11th century and, according to legend, were erected by Roman IV Diogenes (reigned 1068-1071), whereas Milutin used this construction for his donation, only adding the upper part of the church. It is still unclear how the first building looked like. It could have had three aisles, but churches with just one room and one central dome have been also popular during the 10th to the 12th century. The Bulgarian emperor, Michael Shishman, was buried in the wall of this building after he died at battle of Velbazhd, against Serbian king Stefan Uroš III Dechanski in 1330.

In the south-western corner, fragments of a staircase can be found, which could have led to a pulpit. During the reign of Milutin, the entrance was blocked by bricks and plaster with frescos was added. On the north and south facade exist remains of pilasters, ending at a height of 4,10m. A fragment of a pillar was found in a distance of 3,90m to the south wall, assuming porticos for those two walls, today lost. They seem to have been maintained by Milutin as they can be seen on the model of the church, which is presented to saint George by the king.

== Frescos ==
A second donor's inscription on the southern part of the western wall of the inner narthex gives the year 1317/18 as the completion date of the frescos under the reign of bishop Benjamin of Nagoričane. But they could have been started a year earlier as the building is rather big. Its painters were Michael Astrapas and Eutychios, who led the most productive artist's studio of the palaiologan time for three decades. The frescos of Staro Nagoričane are considered their masterpiece. Two dedications of Michael Astrapas can be found - one on a shield of a warrior saint on the northern wall of the naos, the other one on the clothing of a saint on the south-western pillar.

The scenes are arranged in up to seven stripes lying on top of each other, whereby this design only accounts for the naos. The lowest zone is represented by geometrical patterns. Saintly figures (warriors, martyrs, monks, apostles, ascetics) like Pachomius, Cosmas of Jerusalem and John of Damascus are arranged in the second stripe. Only this register can also be found in the inner narthex. The next zone consist of scenes out of the life of saint George, especially his torture. The passion of Christ is depicted one level higher, above that his appearance after the resurrection, followed by his miracles. The last register, mainly stretching across arch areas and barrel vaults, is ending in the cycle of the great feasts like the annunciation, the nativity, the baptism, the entry into Jerusalem and so on. The apse is divided into six stripes: geometrical patterns, church fathers, bishop busts, communion of the apostles, bishop busts and the enthroned Mary with the Christ Child on her lap, flanked by the angels Michael and Gabriel. Apocryphal scenes out of the life of Mary can be seen on the walls of the prothesis, while those of saint Nicholas are displayed in the diaconicon. The iconographic program in the inner narthex consists of the menologium, a directory of Memorial Days and religious holidays. Above the western entrance is a depiction of the Dormition.

The style of the frescos is that of the Palaiologan Renaissance, which came up in the 13th century and is characterised by the revival of ancient forms with iconographic innovations. One feature is the extension of the colour spectrum by warmer shades like red and the use of white as a highlighter to increase the dimensionality of the clothing. Furthermore, the number of cycles enhances, simultaneously resulting in the miniaturization of the figures. This and poorly lit rooms are the reason for more animated scenes and intensified gestures. The style as just described was especially used in churches of king Milutin.

The church contains a series of images of saints and feasts presented in the order in which they are celebrated during the year, which is one of early Serbian calendars, painted during the rule of king Stefan Milutin.

== State of preservation ==
The frescos are in bad condition, especially those in the upper parts and in the domes. The north-western one shows deprivation of pigments in particular. Humidity was detected in the main dome in fall 2011, which destroys the frescos increasingly. A conservation project, funded by the European Union, was decided in summer 2013, but is unfortunately not carried out yet. Two students of the Georg-August-University of Göttingen started the project "Macedonian Frescos 360 (Masco)" in April 2016. Its goal is to point towards the endangered cultural asset by taking 360-degree panorama pictures of the interior, thus providing a virtual tour of the church.

== Gallery ==
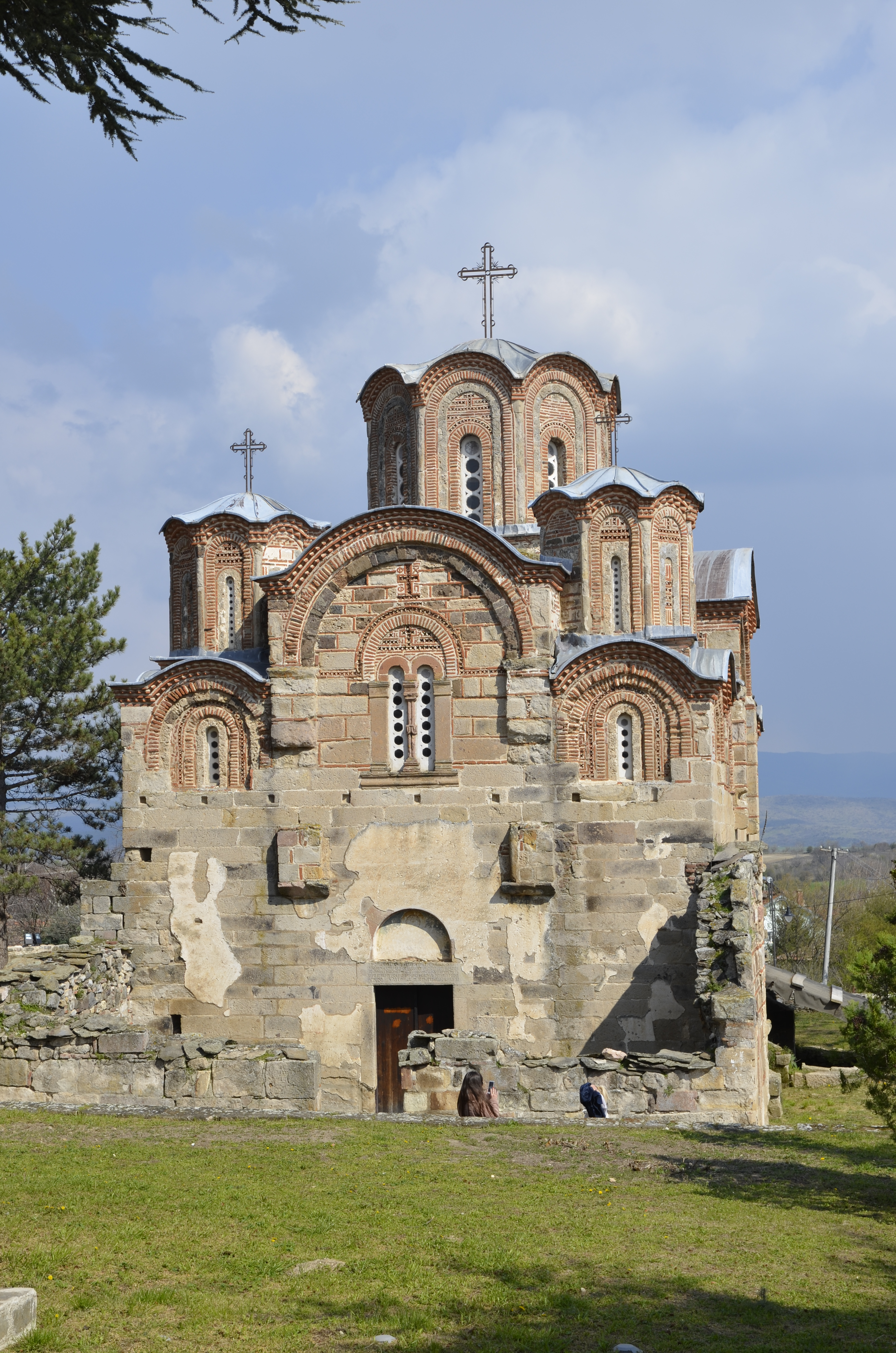
East side of the church

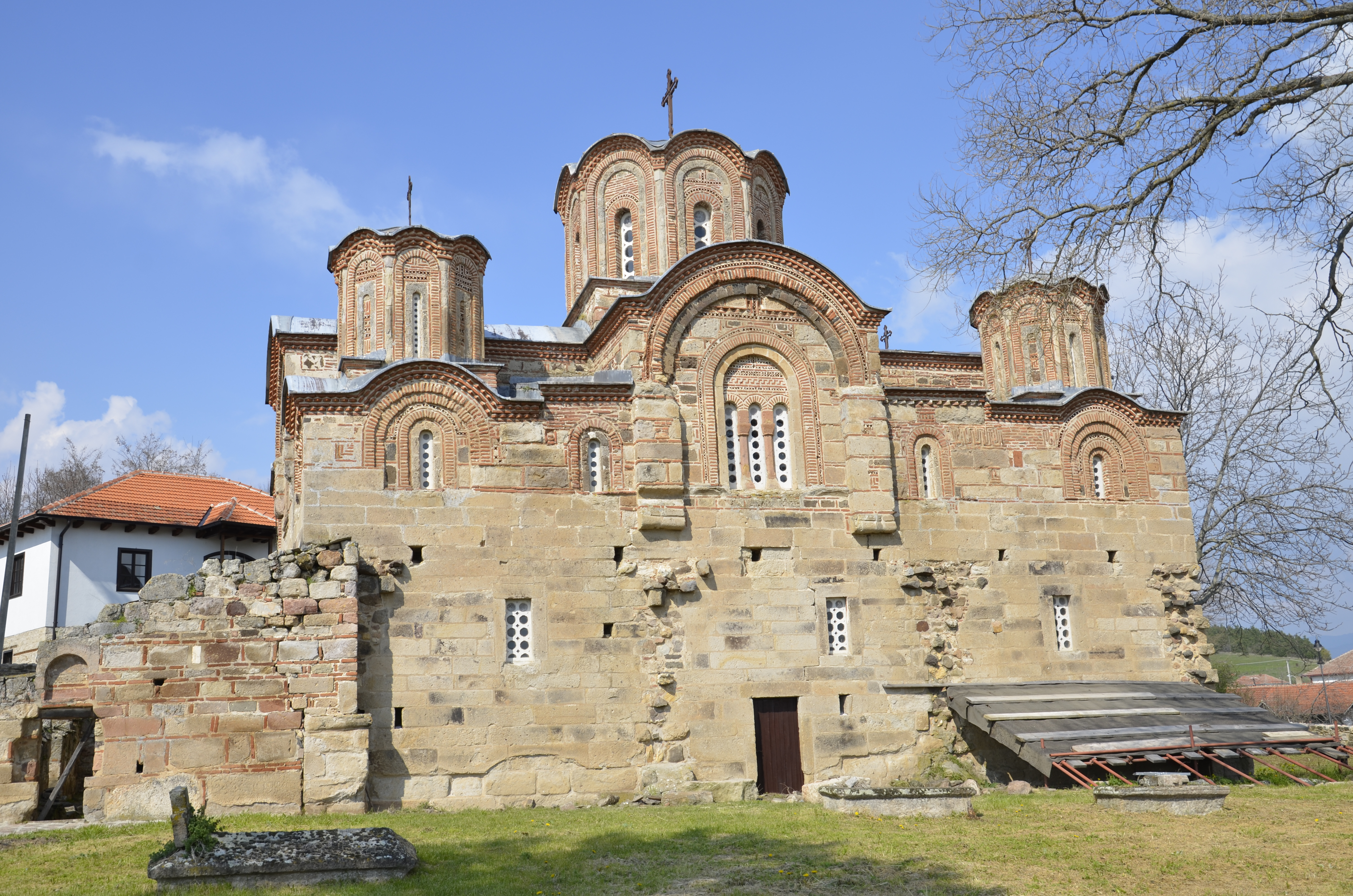
South side of the church

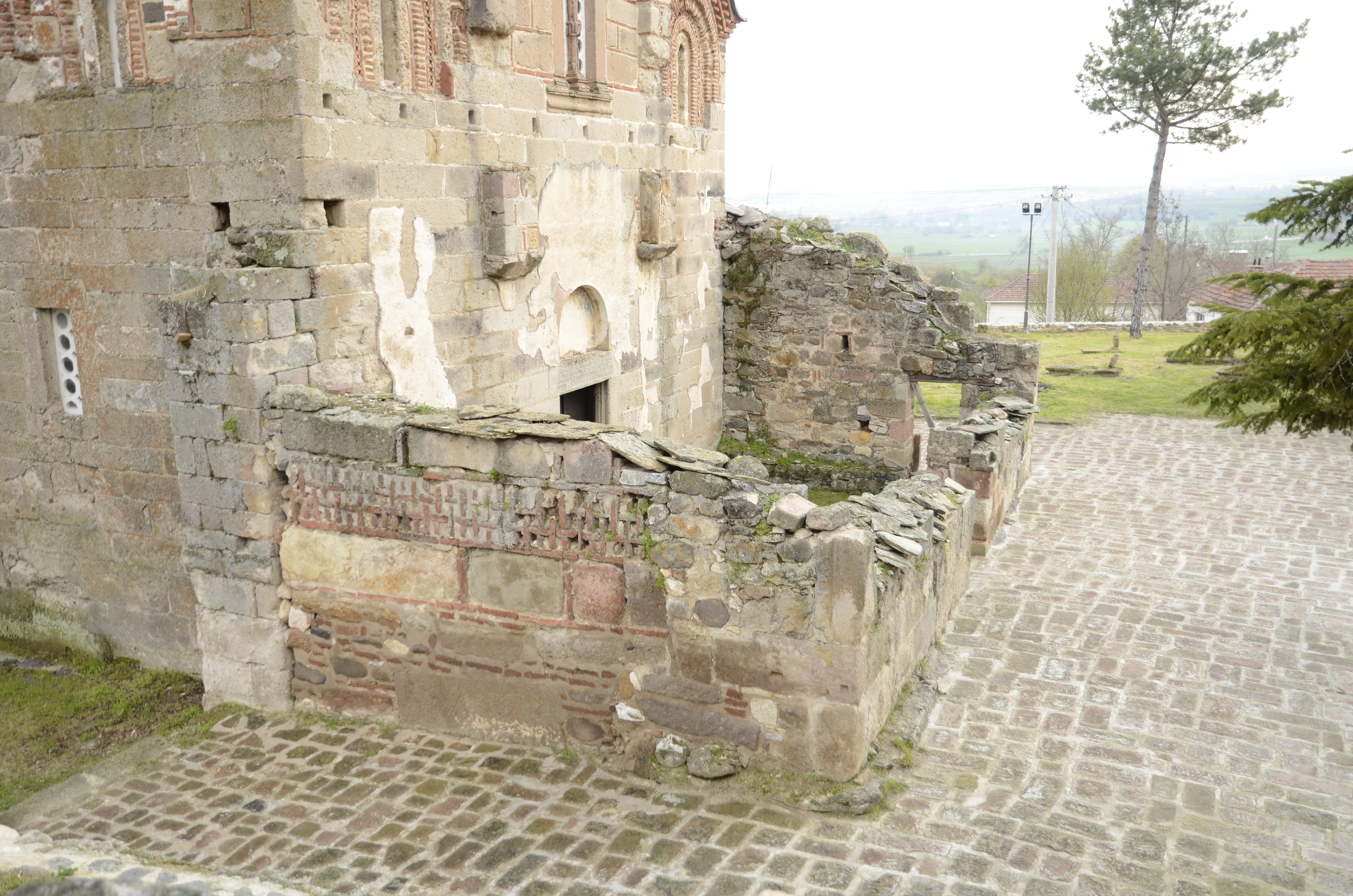
Remains of the outer narthex

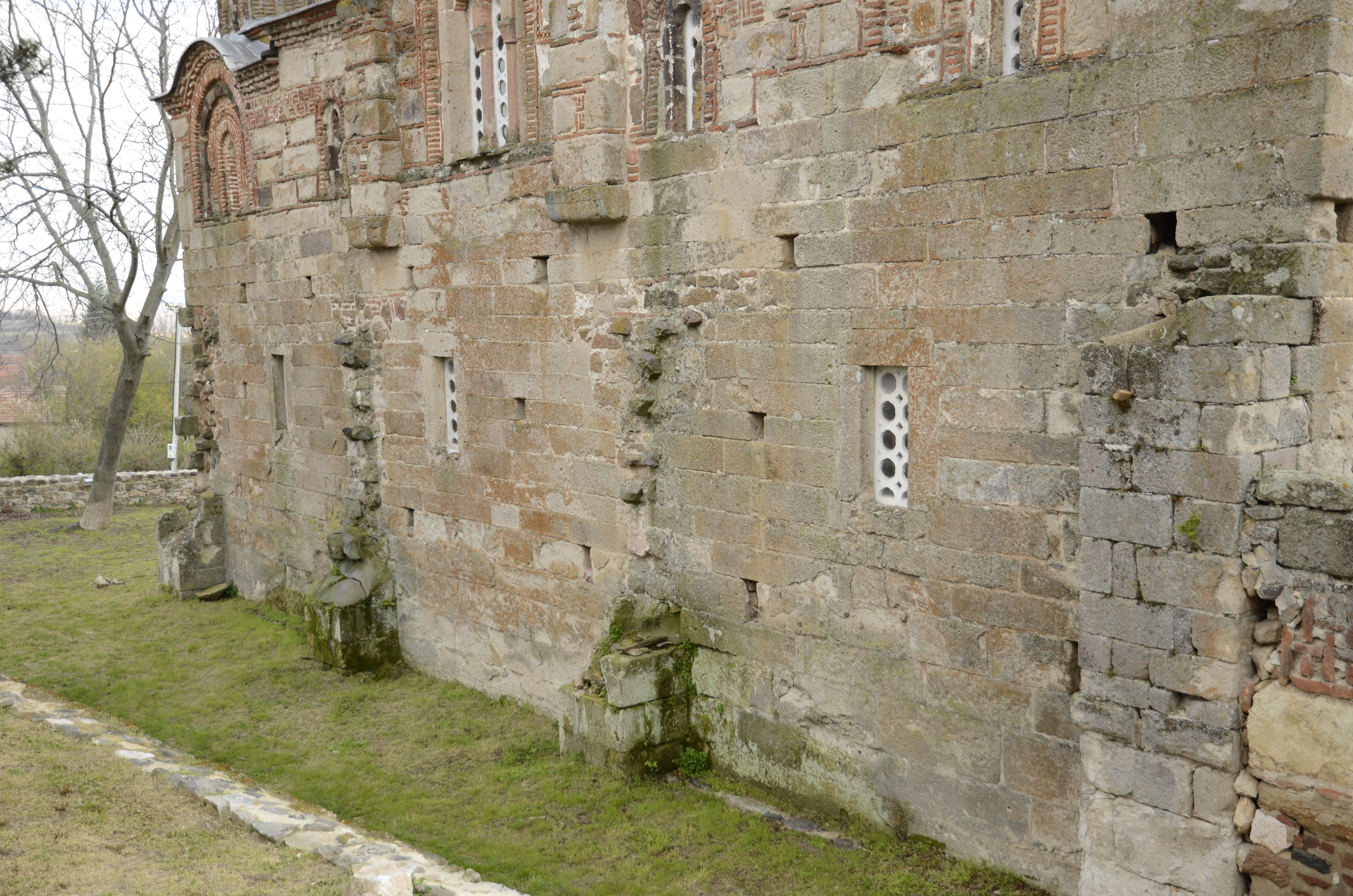
North side, remains of pilasters

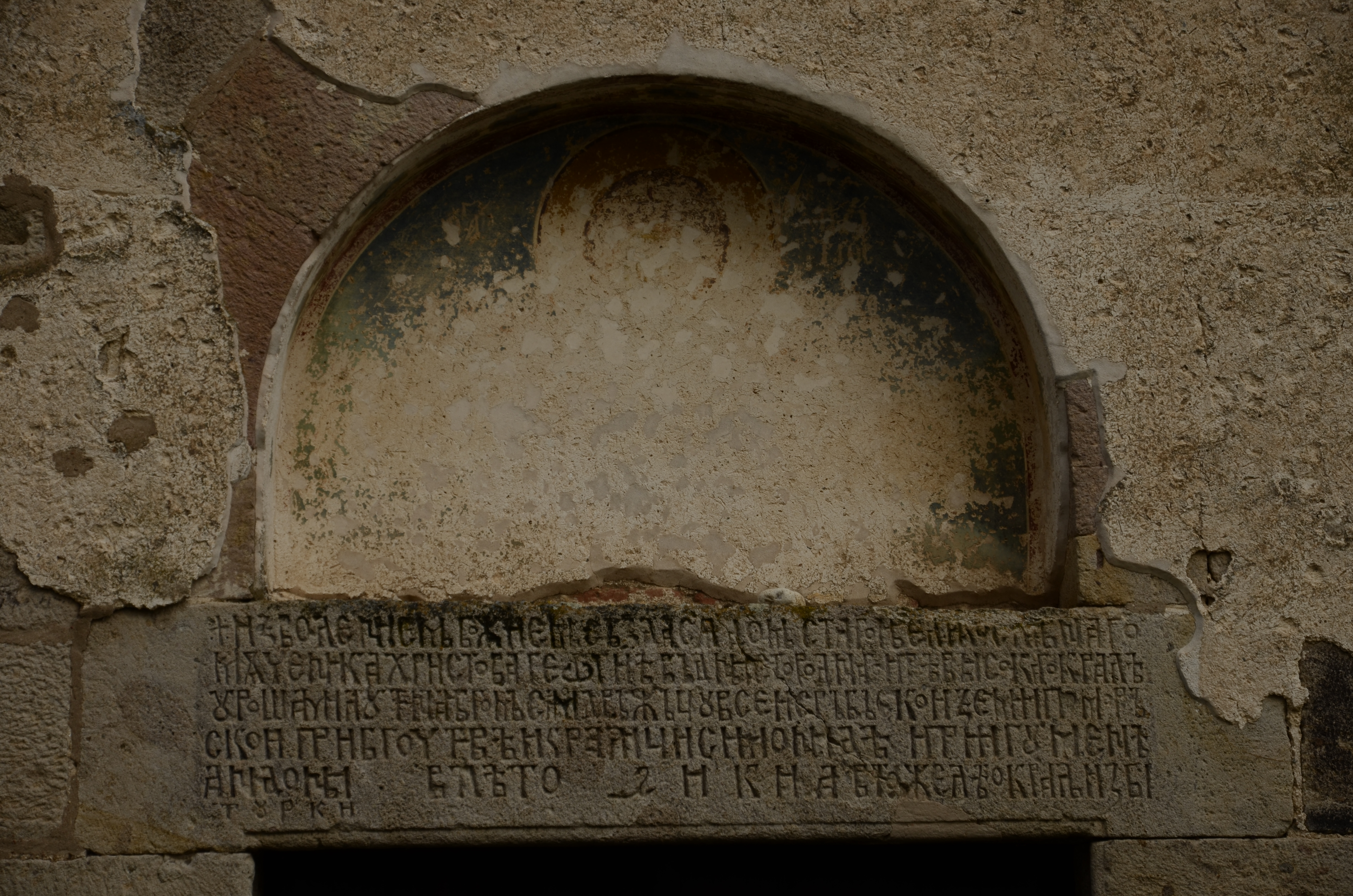
Inscription and fresco of Saint George above the western entrance

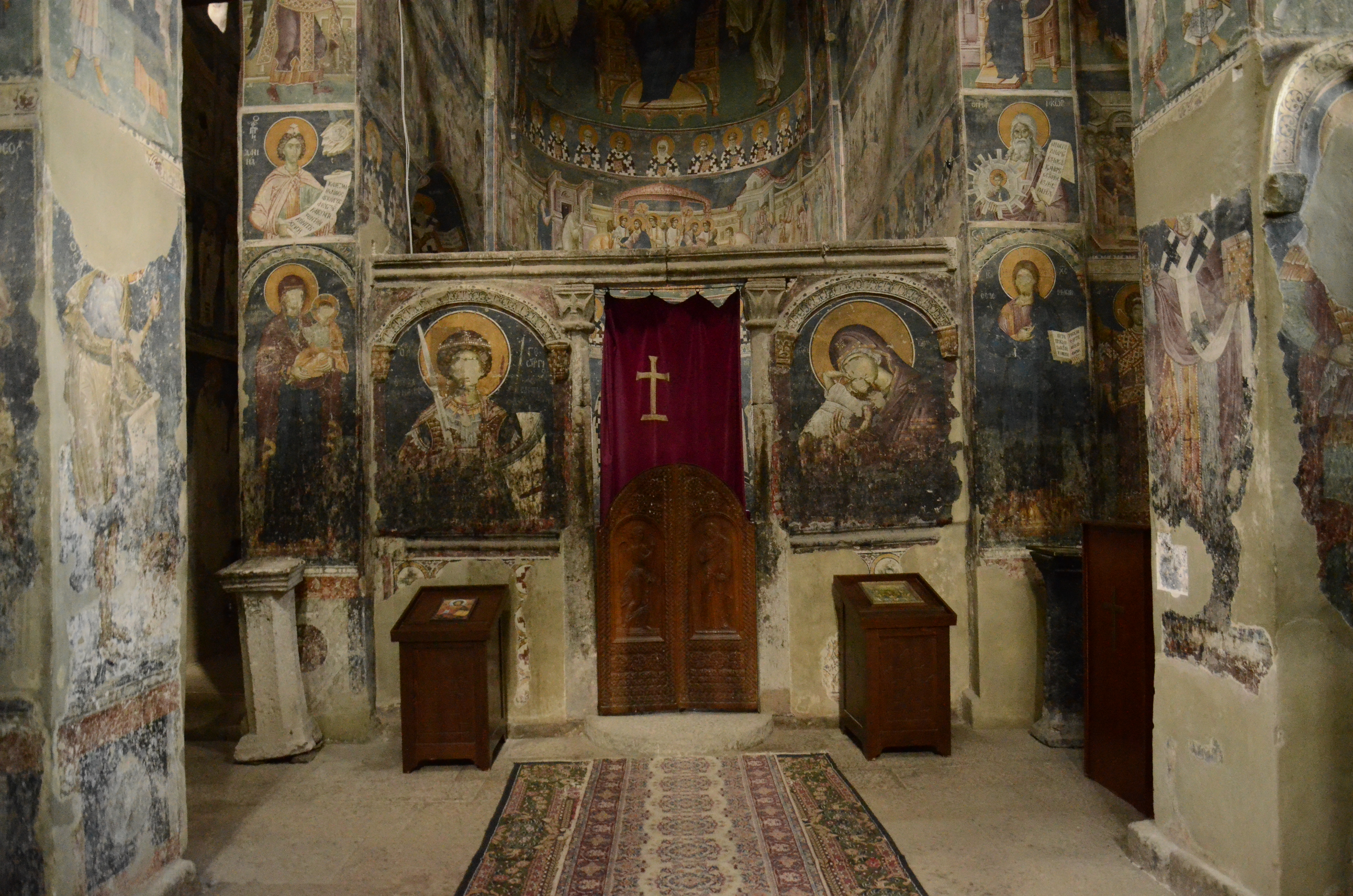
Iconostasis with Mary and Saint George

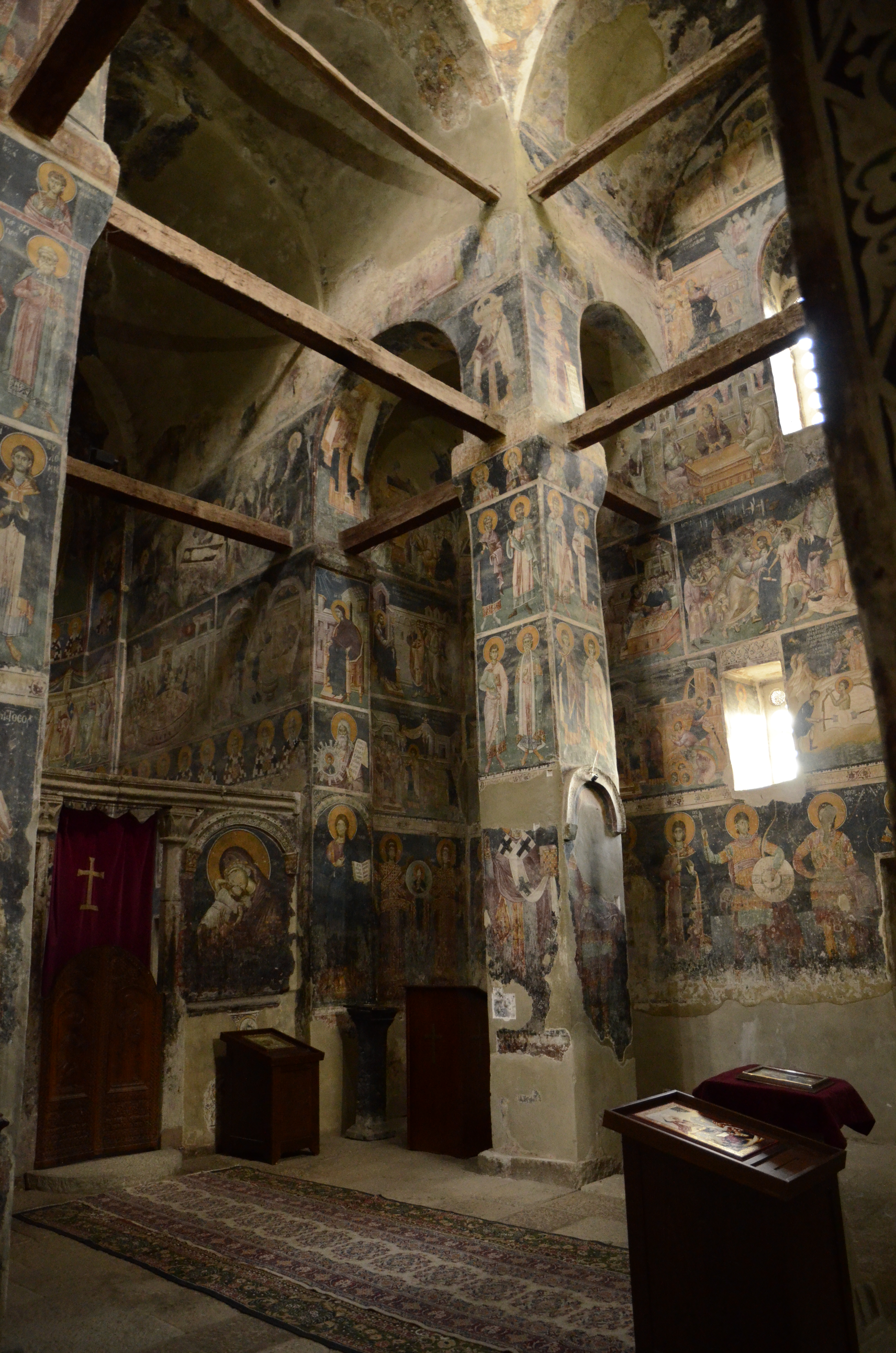
Southeastern corner of the church

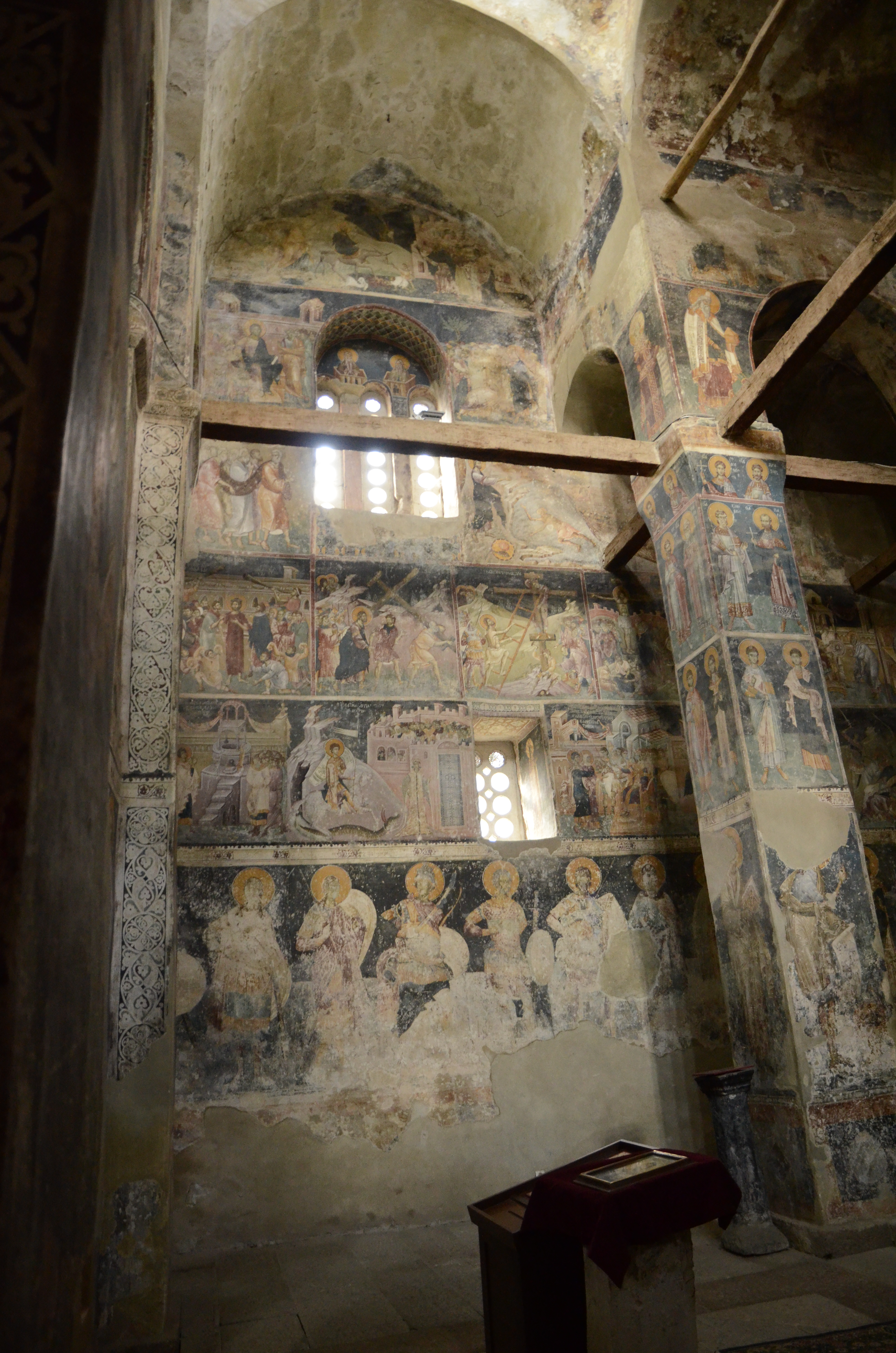
Frescos on the northern wall

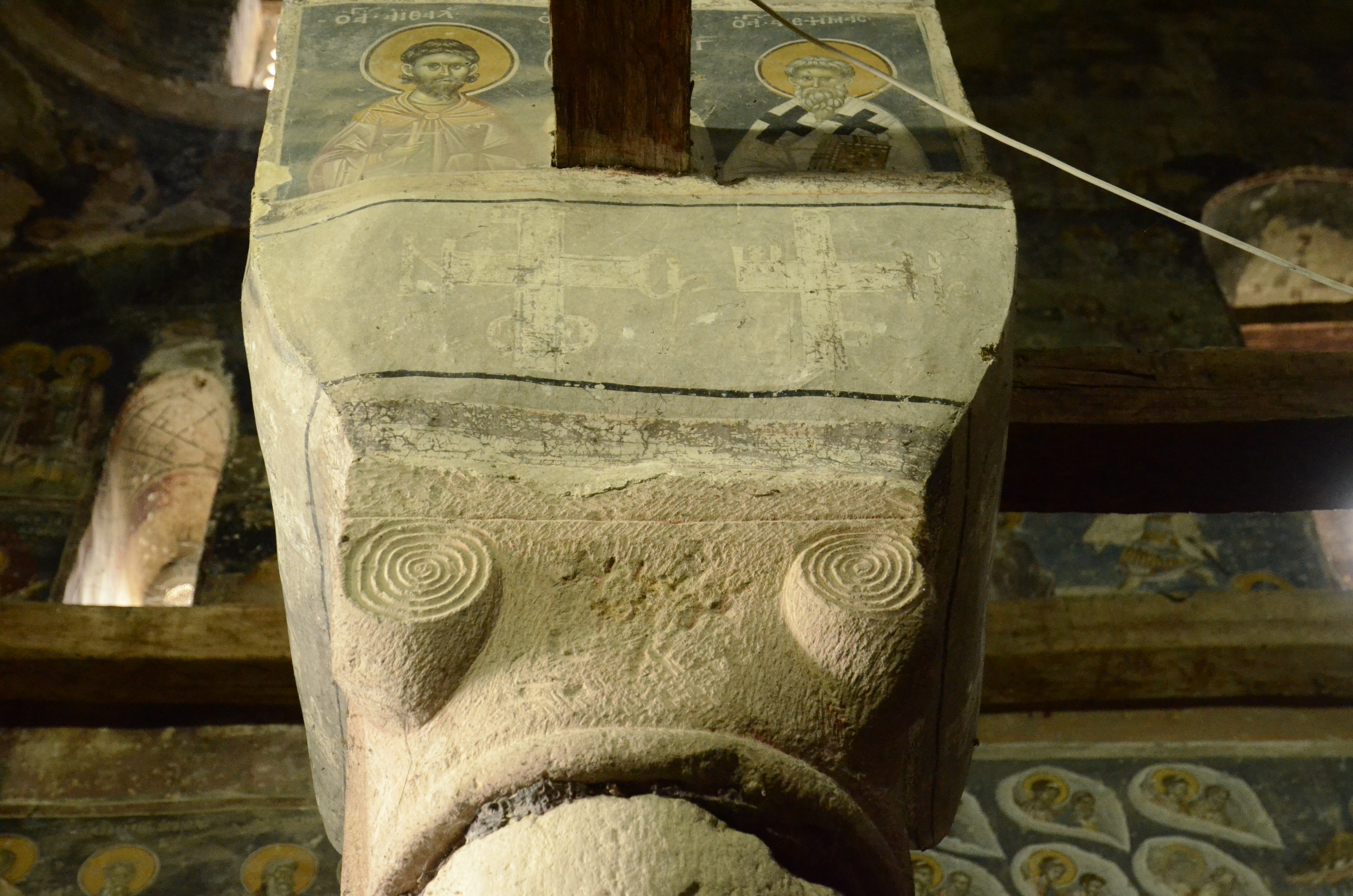
Capital in the inner narthex

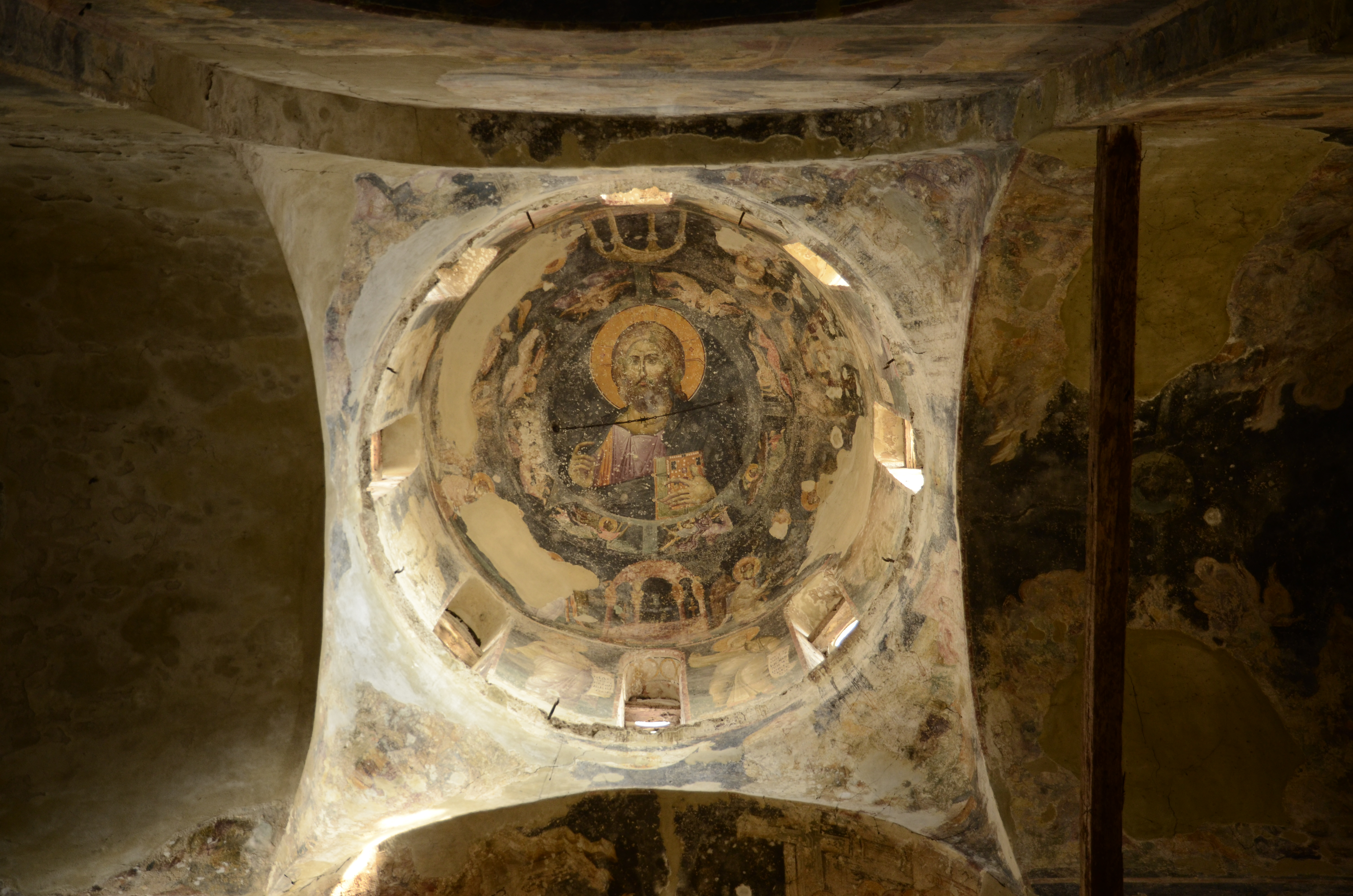
Christ Pantocrator in the main dome

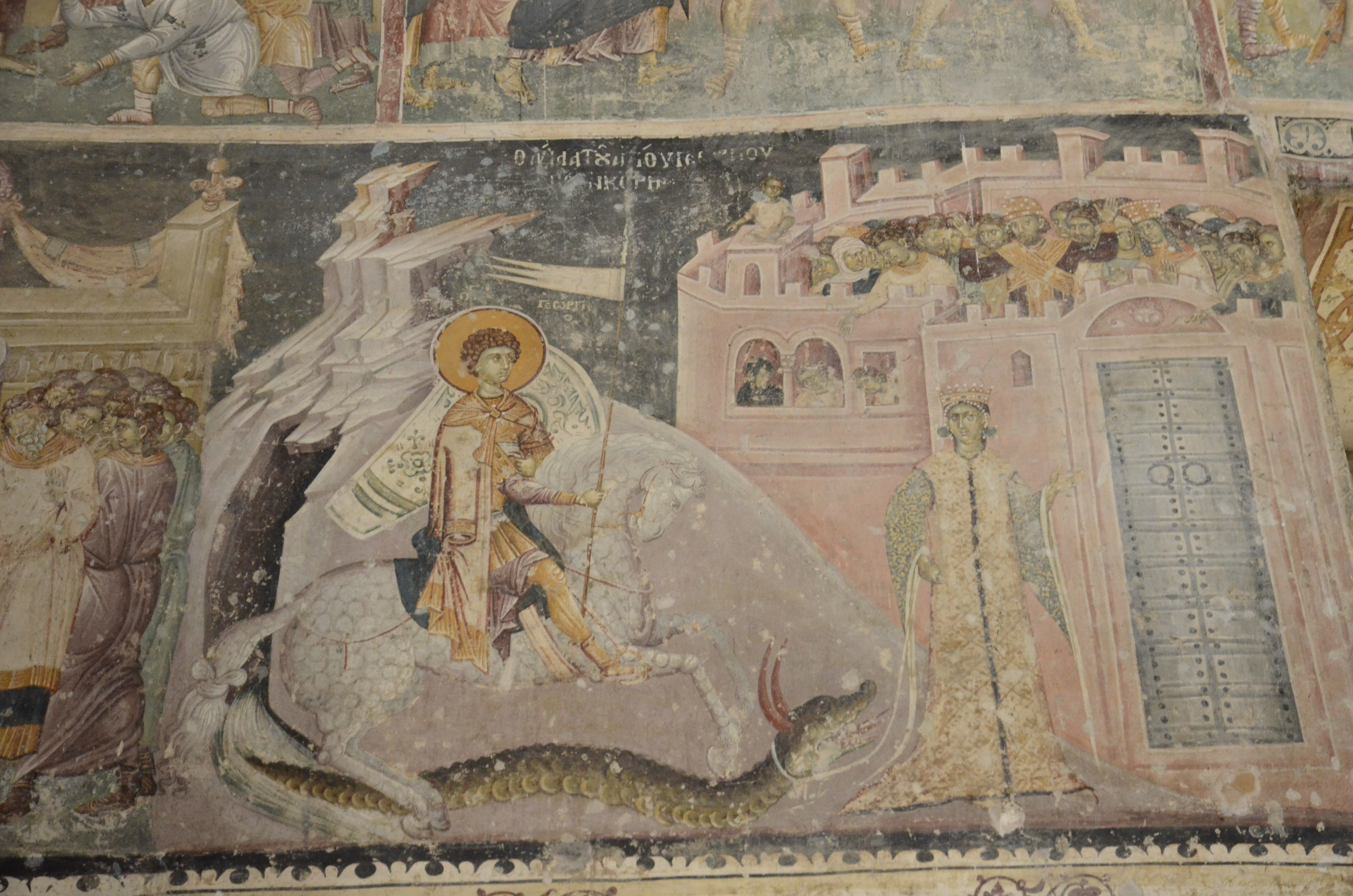
Saint George slaying the dragon

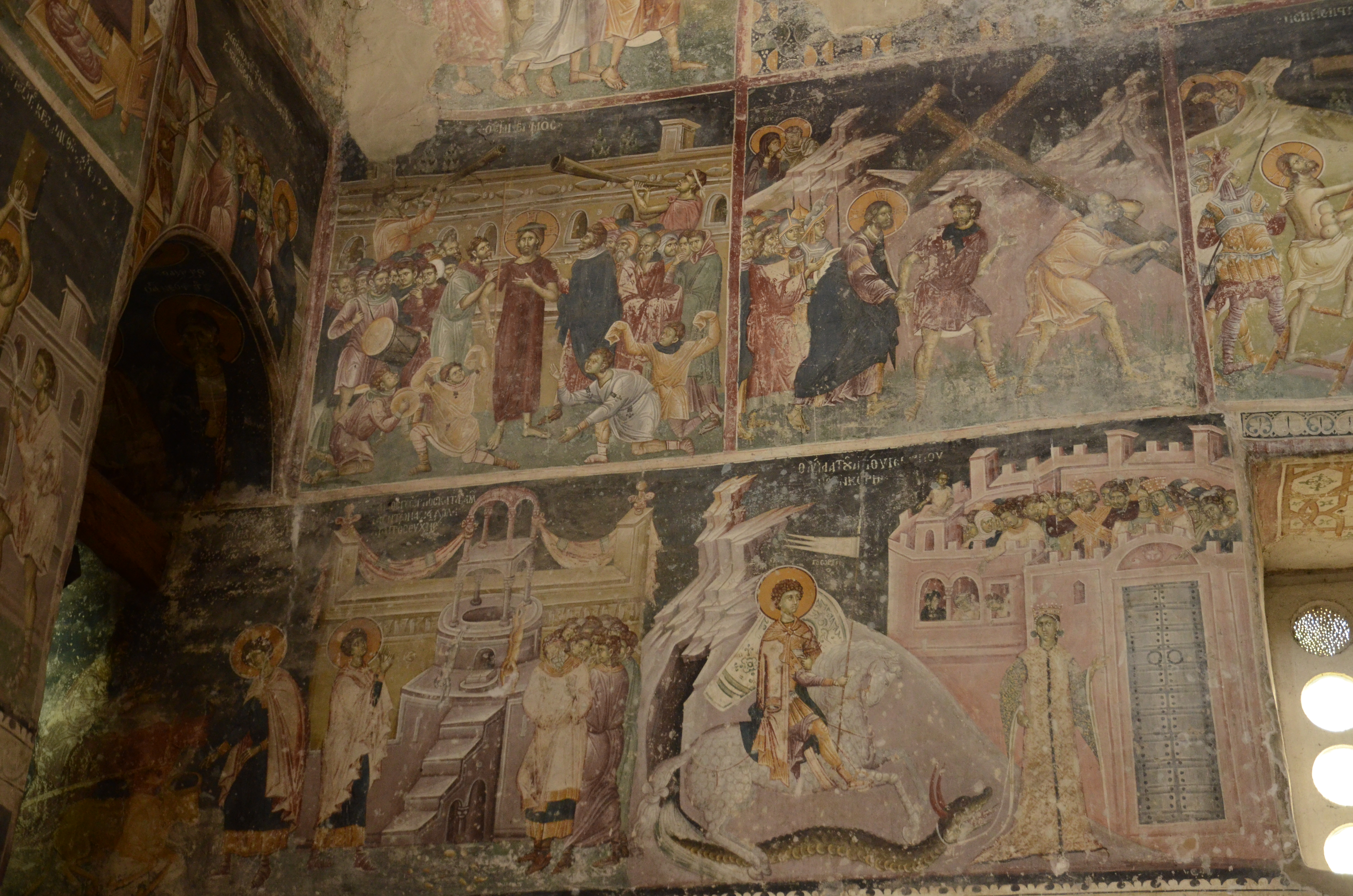
Northern wall, Mocking, Road to Golgotha, George destroying idols, George slaying the dragon

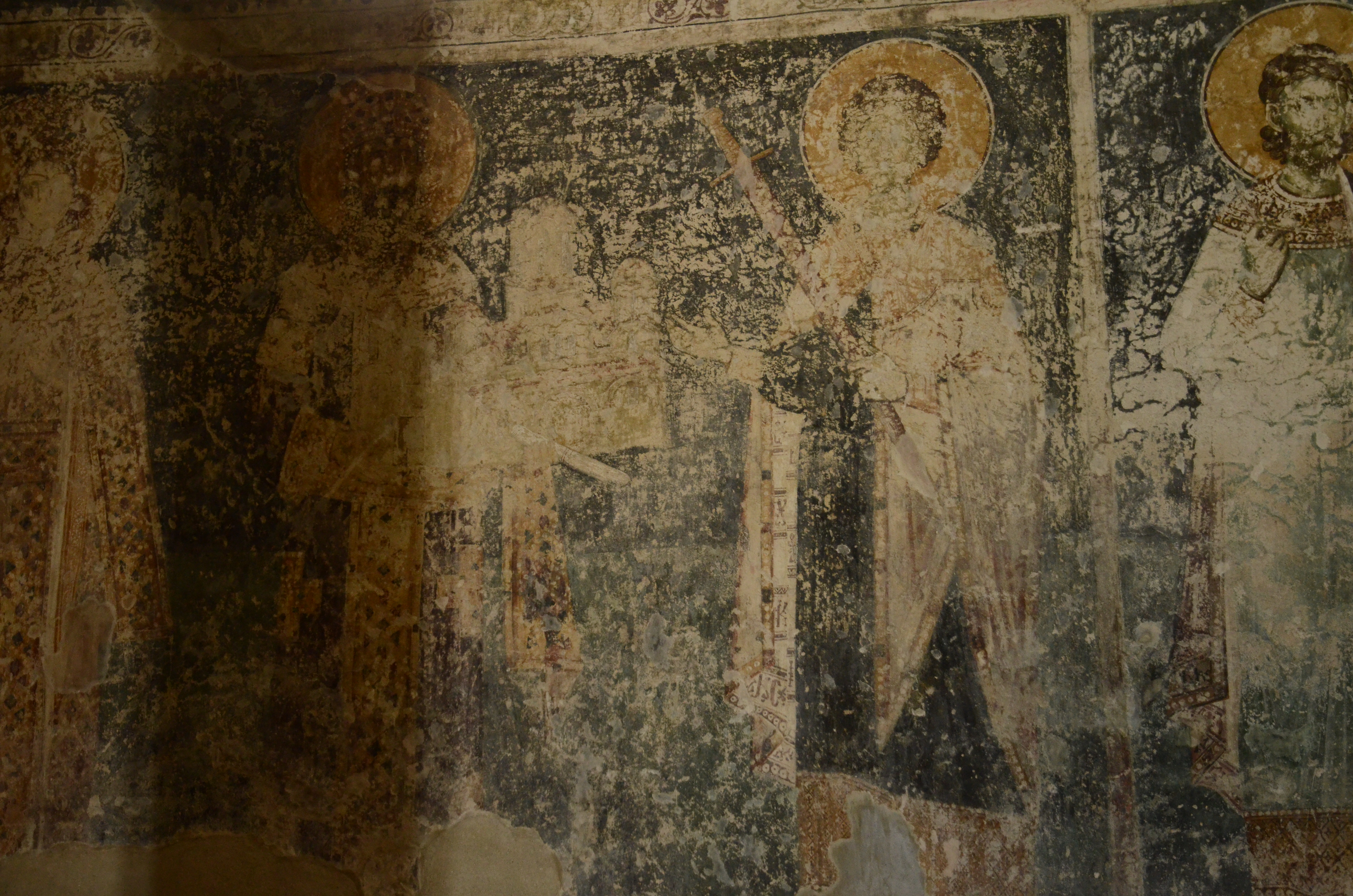
Donor's composition, King Milutin, Saint George

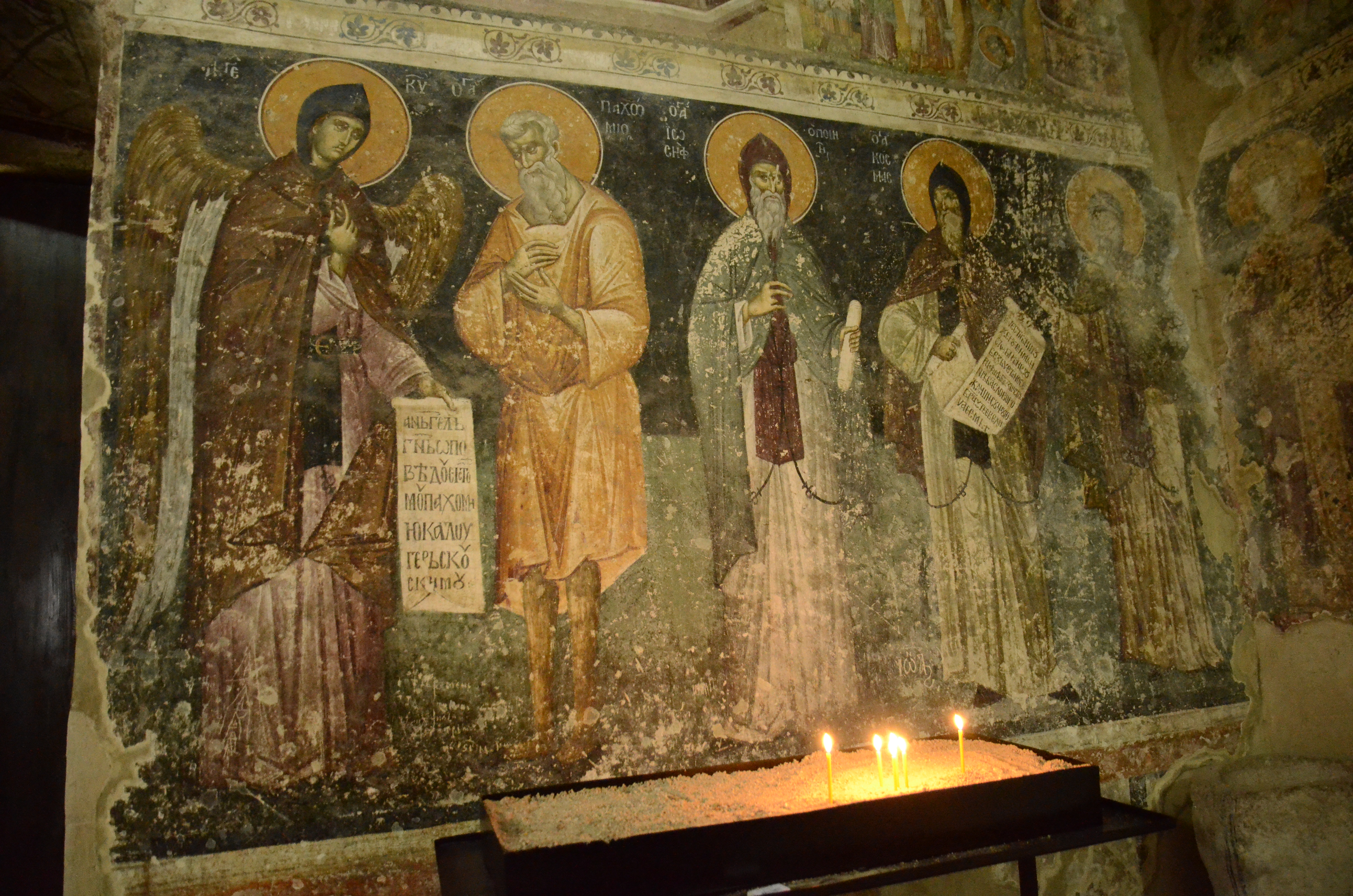
Saints on the western wall

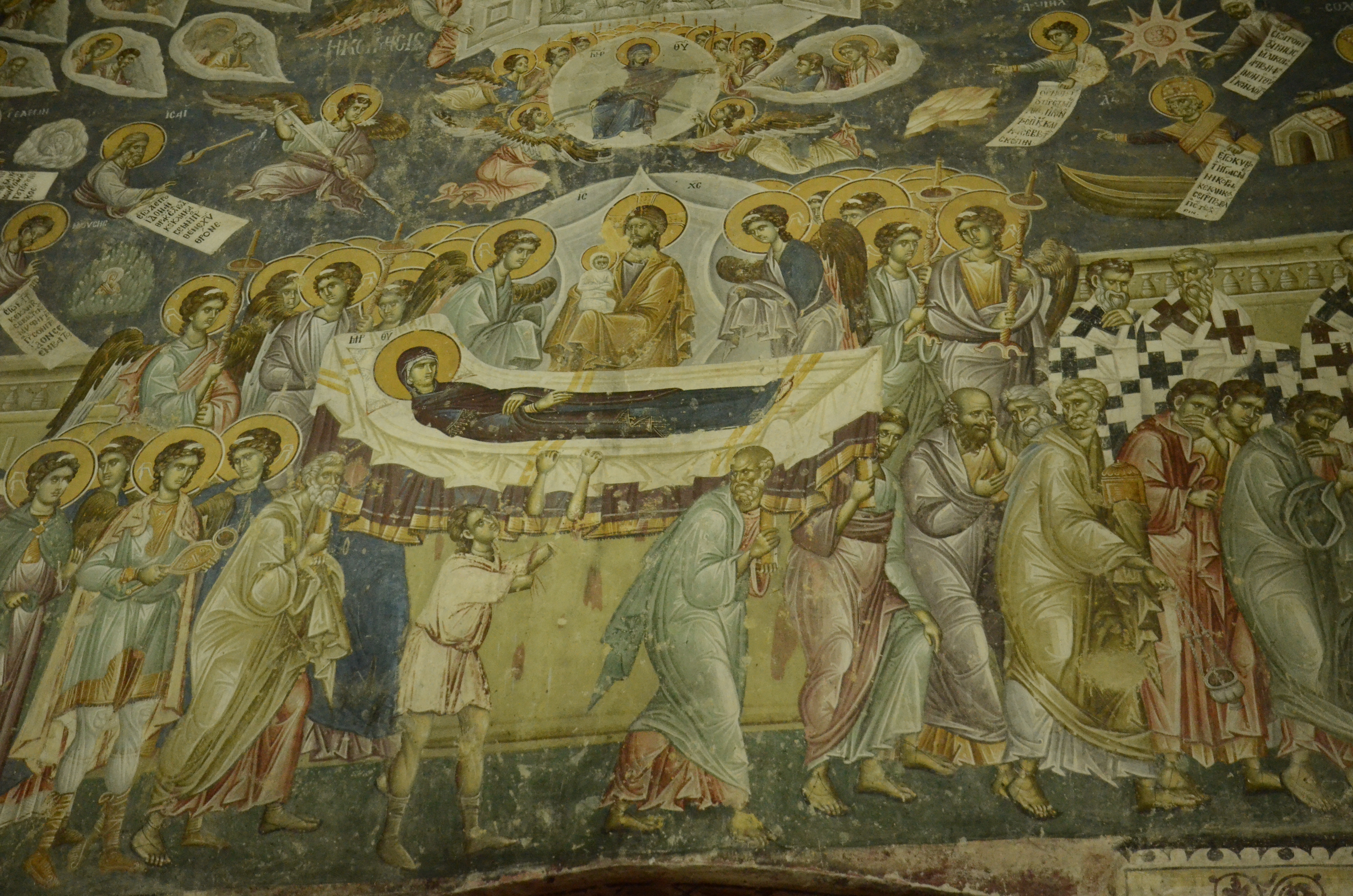
Dormition on the western wall

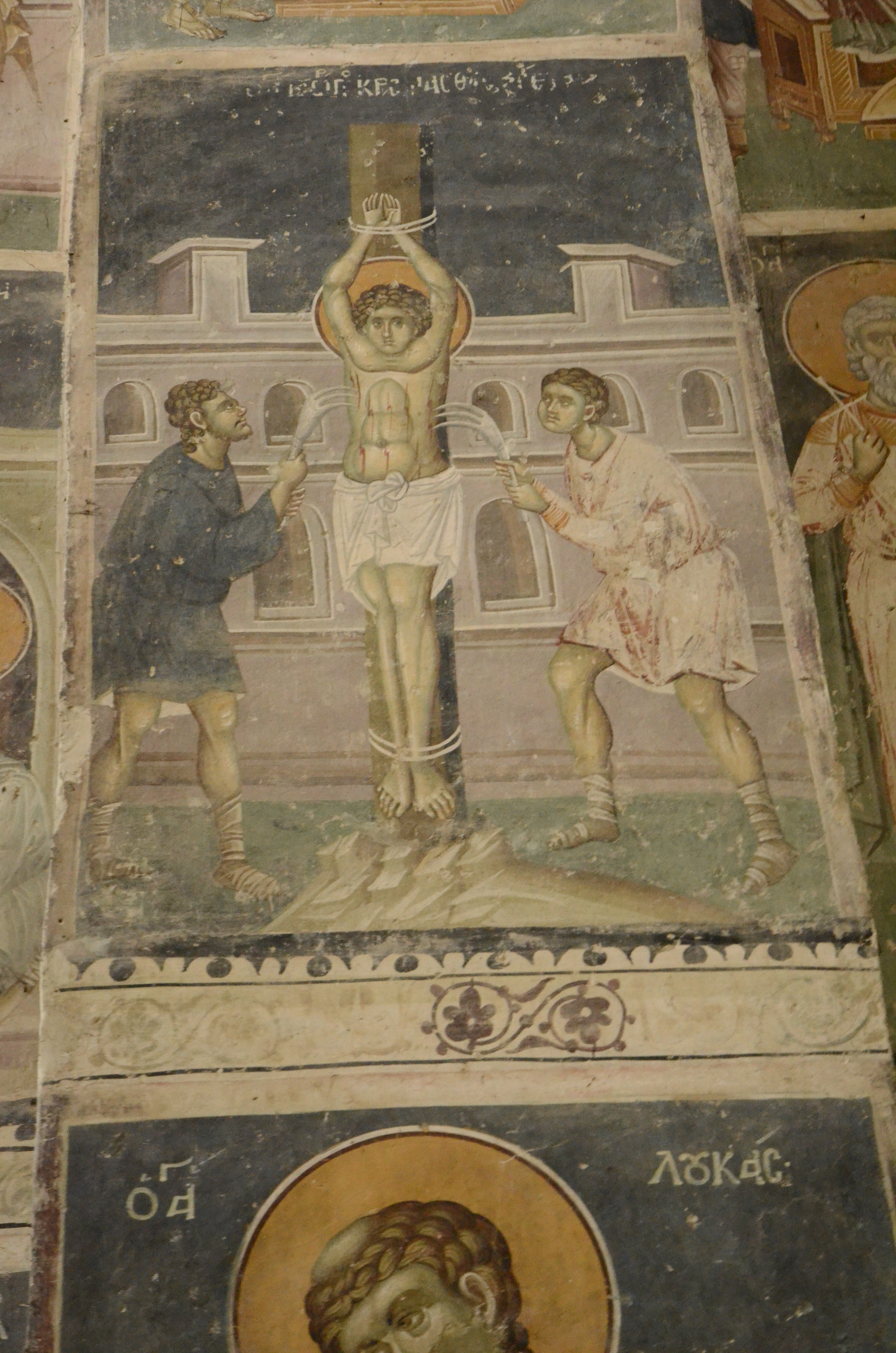
Torture of Saint George

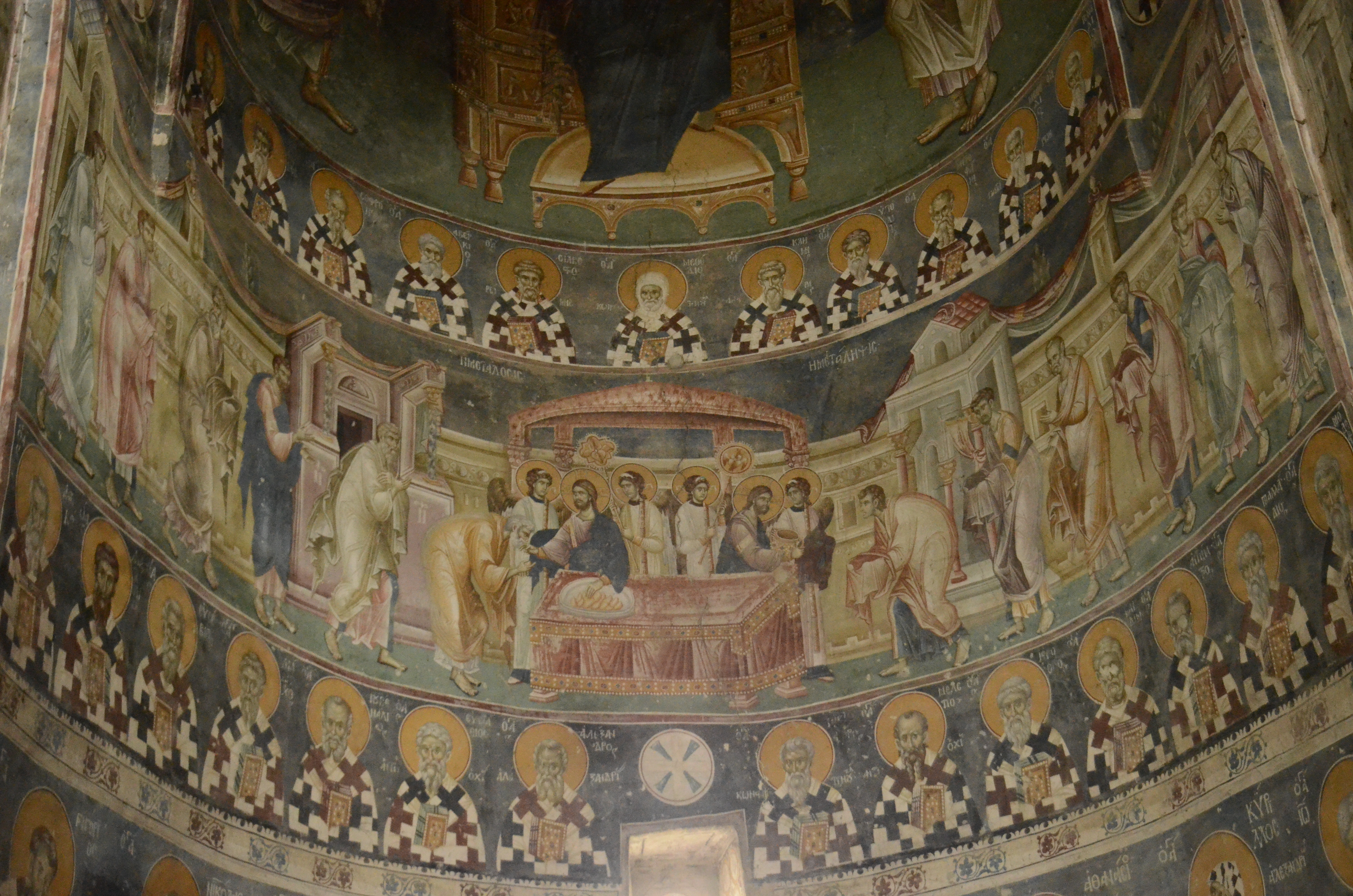
Communion of the Apostles in the apse

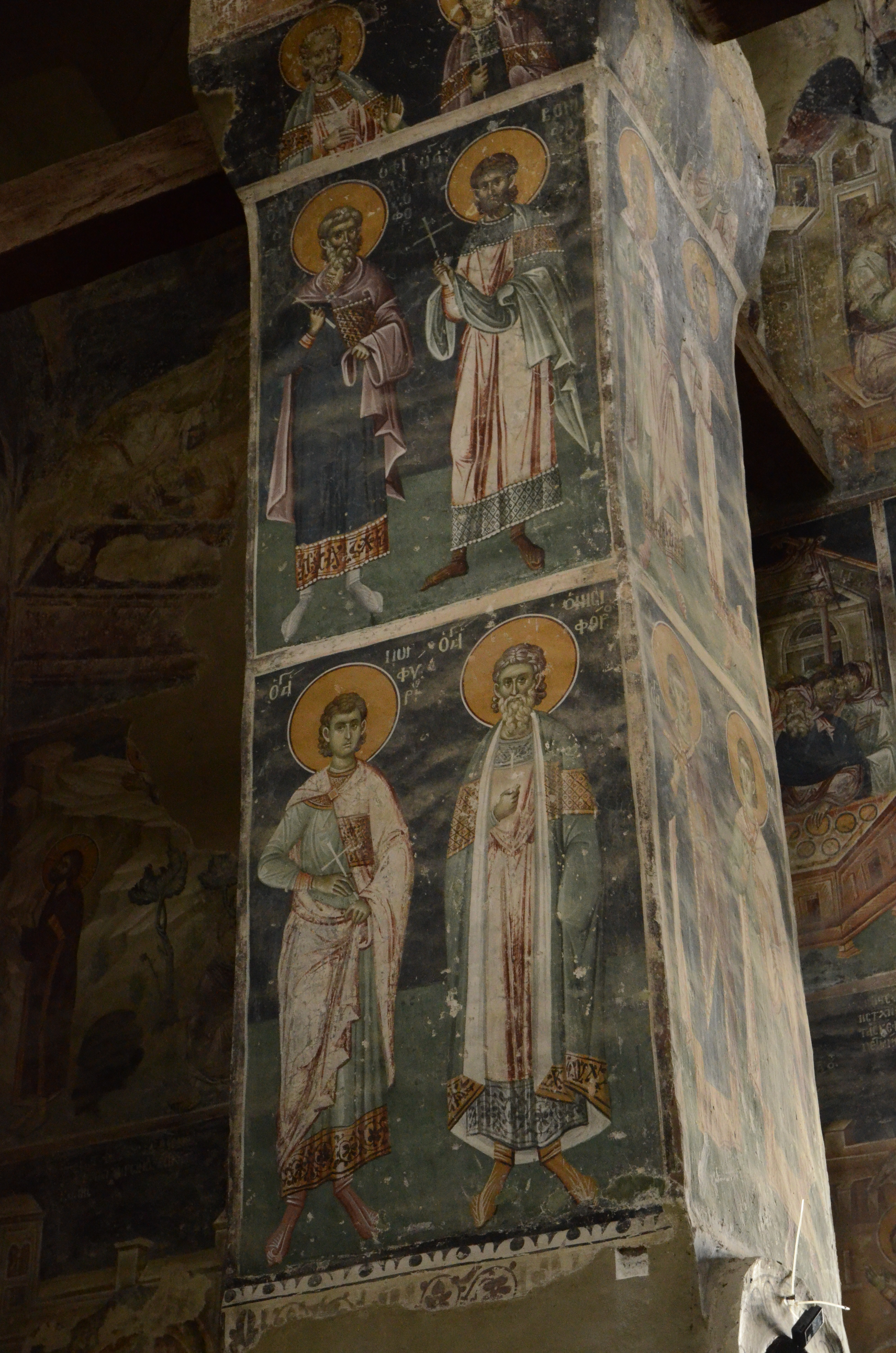
Pillar with saints

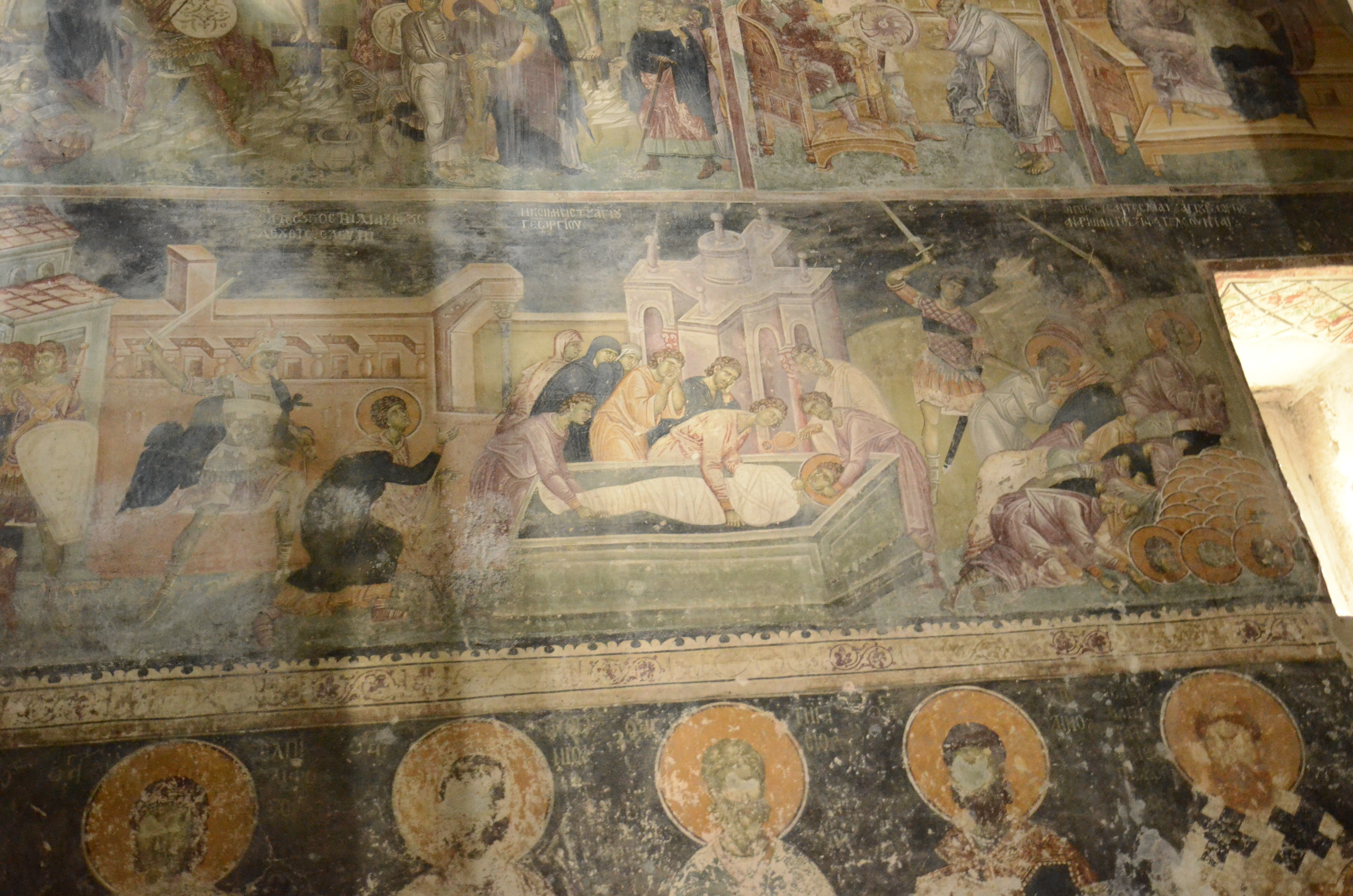
Beheading and entombment of Saint George

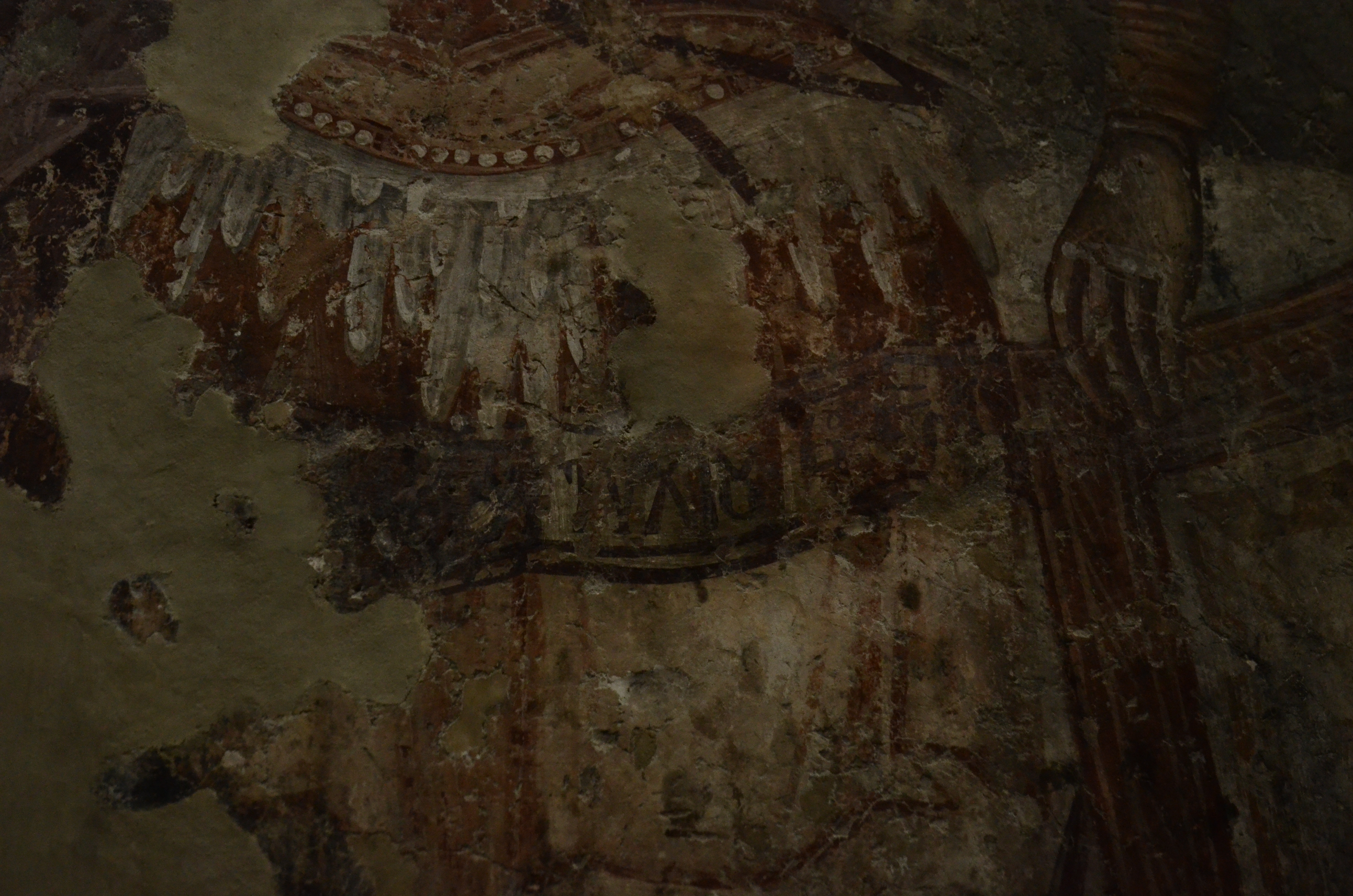
Inscription of Michael Astrapas

== See also ==
- Saint George: Devotions, traditions and prayers

== Sources ==
- Todić, Branislav (1999). Serbian Medieval Painting: The Age of King Milutin. Belgrade: Draganić.
