= Zrze =

Zrze Зрзе
- Village
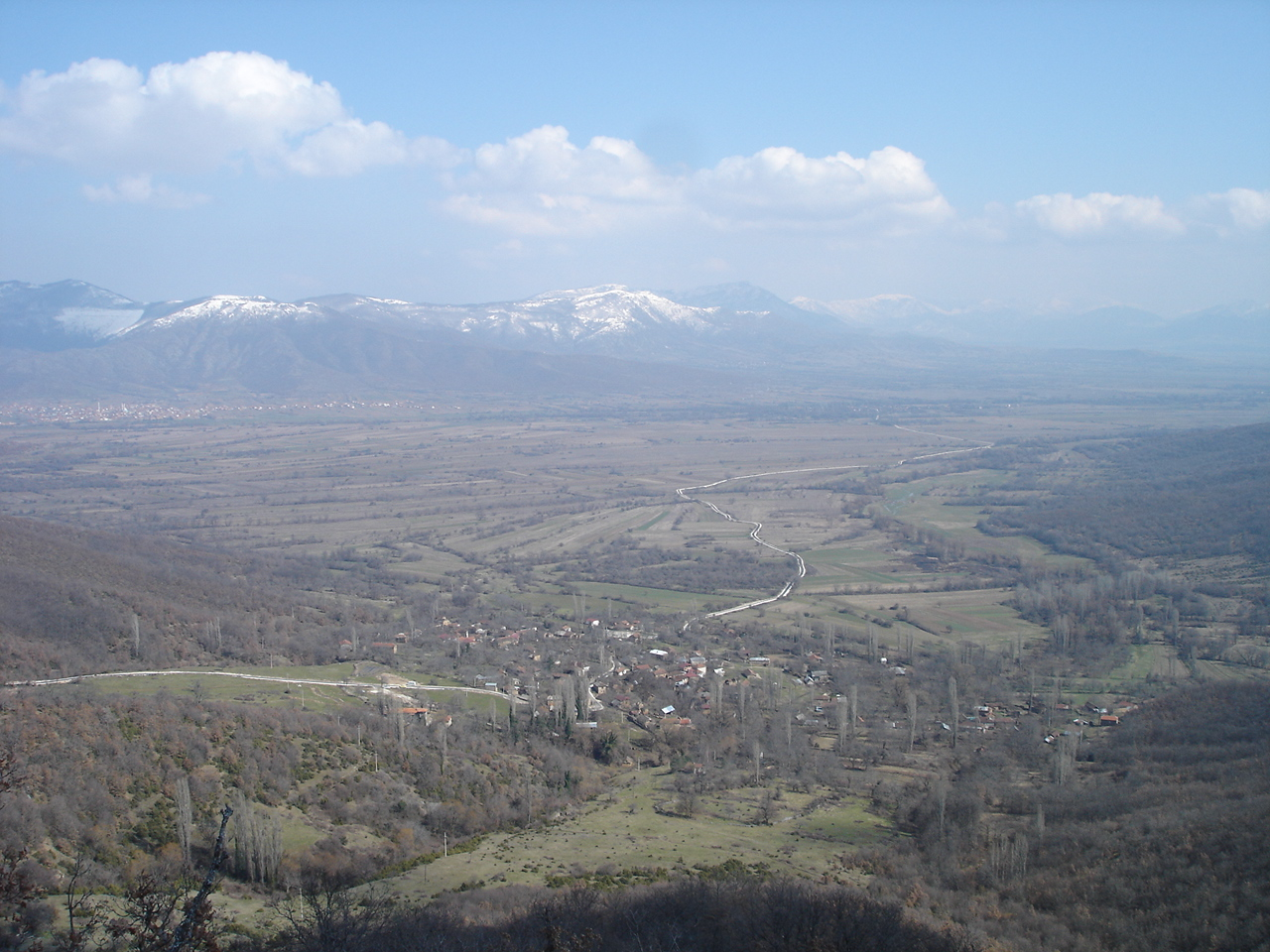

- Location within North Macedonia
- Country: North Macedonia
- Region: Pelagonia
- Municipality: Dolneni
- Elevation: 653 m (2,142 ft)

Population (2021)
  - Total: 39
- Time zone: UTC+1 (CET)
- Area code: +38948

Zrze (Macedonian: Зрзе) is a village in the municipality of Dolneni, North Macedonia.

== Demographics ==
According to the statistics of Vasil Kanchov ("Macedonia. Ethnography and Statistics") from 1900, Zrze was inhabited by 400 Bulgarian Christians. According to the 2021 census, the village had a total of 39 inhabitants. Ethnic groups in the village include:

- Macedonians 64

Year	Macedonian	Albanian	Turks	Romani	Vlachs	Serbs	Bosniaks	Persons for whom data are taken from admin. sources	Total
2002	64	...	...	...	...	...	...	...	64
2021	36	...	...	1	...	...	...	2	39
