= List of Theotokos of St. Theodore icons =

This article lists icons of the Theotokos of St. Theodore having historical or cultural value, or housed in scholarly museums or collections.

Title	Place of creation (city, state)	Date	Medium	Size	Location before 1917	Current Location	Image
Theotokos of St. Theodore from Nikolay Gostinsky Cruch	Russia (most likely Moscow)	End of 17th century	Wood, Primer, Tempera	42.0 cm (16.5 in) х 34.5 cm (13.6 in)	Nikolay Gostinsky Cruch, Moscow Kremlin, Russia	Moscow Kremlin, collection J-384, number 2754	Theotokos of St. Theodore from Nikolay Gostinsky Cruch
Theotokos of St. Theodore	Russia	18th century	Wood, Primer, Tempera	31.5 cm (12.4 in) х 27.5 cm (10.8 in)	Unknown	Unknown; through Sotheby's	Theotokos of St. Theodore through Sotheby's
Theotokos of St. Theodore from Kostroma	Russia, Kostroma, iconographer is Georgy Avraamov	1703	Wood, Primer, Tempera	64.3 cm (25.3 in) х 49.0 cm (19.3 in)	in Kostroma	State Historical Museum, Russia number 58271 i VIII 3740	Theotokos of St. Theodore from Kostroma
Theotokos of St. Theodore from workroom of Chichikovs	Russia, Moscow, workshop of Chichikovs	1904	Wood, Primer, Tempera	31.0 cm (12.2 in) х 28.5 cm (11.2 in)	Unknown	Unknown	Theotokos of St. Theodore from workroom of Chichikovs
Theotokos of St. Theodore from Yaroslavl	Russia, Yaroslavl	First half of 19th century	Wood, Primer, Tempera	66.4 cm (26.1 in) х 51.3 cm (20.2 in)	Unknown	Yaroslavl Art Museum	Theotokos of St. Theodore from Yaroslavl
Theotokos of St. Theodore from Russian Icons museum	Russia	1850	Wood, Primer, Tempera		Unknown	Russian Icons museum	Theotokos of St. Theodore from Russian Icons museum
Theotokos of St. Theodore from Tsarskoye Selo	Russia, Moscow, iconographer is Nemirov-Kolodkin's workroom	1903, Begin of 20th century	Wood, Tempera, Silver, Repoussé and chasing	31.4 cm (12.4 in) х 27.0 cm (10.6 in)	Alexander Palace's Cruch in Tsarskoye Selo	State Hermitage Museum, St. Petersburg, store number ERO-8754	Theotokos of St. Theodore from Tsarskoye Selo
Theotokos of St. Theodore in a silver frame	Russia, Yaroslavl	First half of 18th century	Wood, Tempera, Silver, Gilding, Repoussé and chasing	69.0 cm (27.2 in) х 50.0 cm (19.7 in)	Unknown, has arrived from the Russian Museum of Ethnography in 1941	State Hermitage Museum, St. Petersburg, store number ERO-7139	Theotokos of St. Theodore from workroom of Chichikovs
Embroidered Theotokos of St. Theodore	Russia	18th century	Canvas, Embroidery (silk and metal threads)	26.0 cm (10.2 in) х 19.0 cm (7.5 in)	Ivan A.Galnbek's collection of icons	State Hermitage Museum, St. Petersburg, store number ERP-922	Embroidered Theotokos of St. Theodore
Theotokos of St. Theodore in the gold salary	Russia	17th century	Wood, Tempera, Silver, Gold, Sapphires, Diamonds, Rubies, Emeralds, Pearls	36.0 cm (14.2 in) х 27.7 cm (10.9 in)	Alexander Palace's Cruch in Tsarskoye Selo	State Hermitage Museum, St. Petersburg, store number ERO-8846	Theotokos of St. Theodore from Tsarskoye Selo
Theotokos of St. Theodore found in 1239	Russia, under the legend it is wonderfully found	1239	Wood, Primer, Tempera		Uspensky cathedral in Kostroma	Revival church on the Jungle in Kostroma. The icons riza is in other place	Theotokos of St. Theodore found in 1239
Theotokos of St. Theodore found in 1239. Riza	Russia, Kostroma, master Ivan Serebryannikov (1756–1795).	Second half of 18th century	Silver		Uspensky cathedral in Kostroma	Any of the Russian museums, the icon is in other place	Theotokos of St. Theodore from workroom of Chichikovs
Theotokos of St. Theodore of 1759	Russia, Kostroma	1759	Wood, Primer, Tempera	65.0 cm (25.6 in) х 50.0 cm (19.7 in)	Dormition Cruch, Moscow	Tretyakov Gallery, Moscow, store number DR-40	Theotokos of St. Theodore of 1759
Theotokos of St. Theodore with miracles	Russia, Kostroma	Second half of 18th century	Wood, Primer, Tempera	36.0 cm (14.2 in) х 31.0 cm (12.2 in)	Unknown	Kolomenskoye, Moscow, store number J-1454	Theotokos of St. Theodore with miracles
Theotokos of St. Theodore with miracles of 19th century	Russia, Kostroma	19th century	Wood, Primer, Tempera		Unknown	Dmitry Bondarenko's collection of icons	Theotokos of St. Theodore with miracles of 19th century

== Miracles of icon ==
Sacred soldier Feodor Stratilat brings an icon of Theotokos to Kostroma		Kostroma prince Vasily Kvashnja, having left on hunting, sees on a pine an icon of Theotokos	Icon fragment	Prince Vasily Kvashnja tries to get an icon, but it remains motionless	Townsmen of Kostroma pray together with the prince Vasily Kvashnja before the shown icon	Carrying over of an icon to Feodor Stratilat's church in Kostroma. Townspeople learn in it that icon which was born through a city by the soldier similar to sacred Feodor Stratilat
The people who have arrived from Gorodets learn the wonder-working icon in the shown image		Icon fragment Icon, must be sacred Feodor and Andrey Stratilat, and must be also the Legend text				Fire in church
Find of an icon safe on a fireplace		Icon fragment Icon, must be sacred Feodor and Andrey Stratilat, and must be also the Legend text				Icon establishment in again built up church
The prince Vasily Kvashnja prays before an icon for protection of Kostroma city against Tatars		Icon fragment Icon, must be sacred Feodor and Andrey Stratilat, and must be also the Legend text				Carrying out of an icon in the field of fight
Icon fragment	The victory over the enemy has occurred thanks to wonderful protection of an icon of Theotokos of St. Theodore	Icon fragment Icon, must be sacred Feodor and Andrey Stratilat, and must be also the Legend text				Returning in Kostroma city and icon installation on a former place
Returning in Kostroma city and icon installation on a former place		During a heavy fire inhabitants of Kostroma see the icon of Theotokos soaring in air	Prayer before an icon of the Mother of god about its returning in Kostroma city		Building of a stone building of church in honour of a wonder-working icon of Theotokos of St. Theodore	Transferring of an icon to new stone church
