= Church of the Resurrection, Kostroma =

Church in Kostroma Oblast, Russia

Church of the Intercession of the Holy Mother of God
- Церковь Воскресения на Дебре
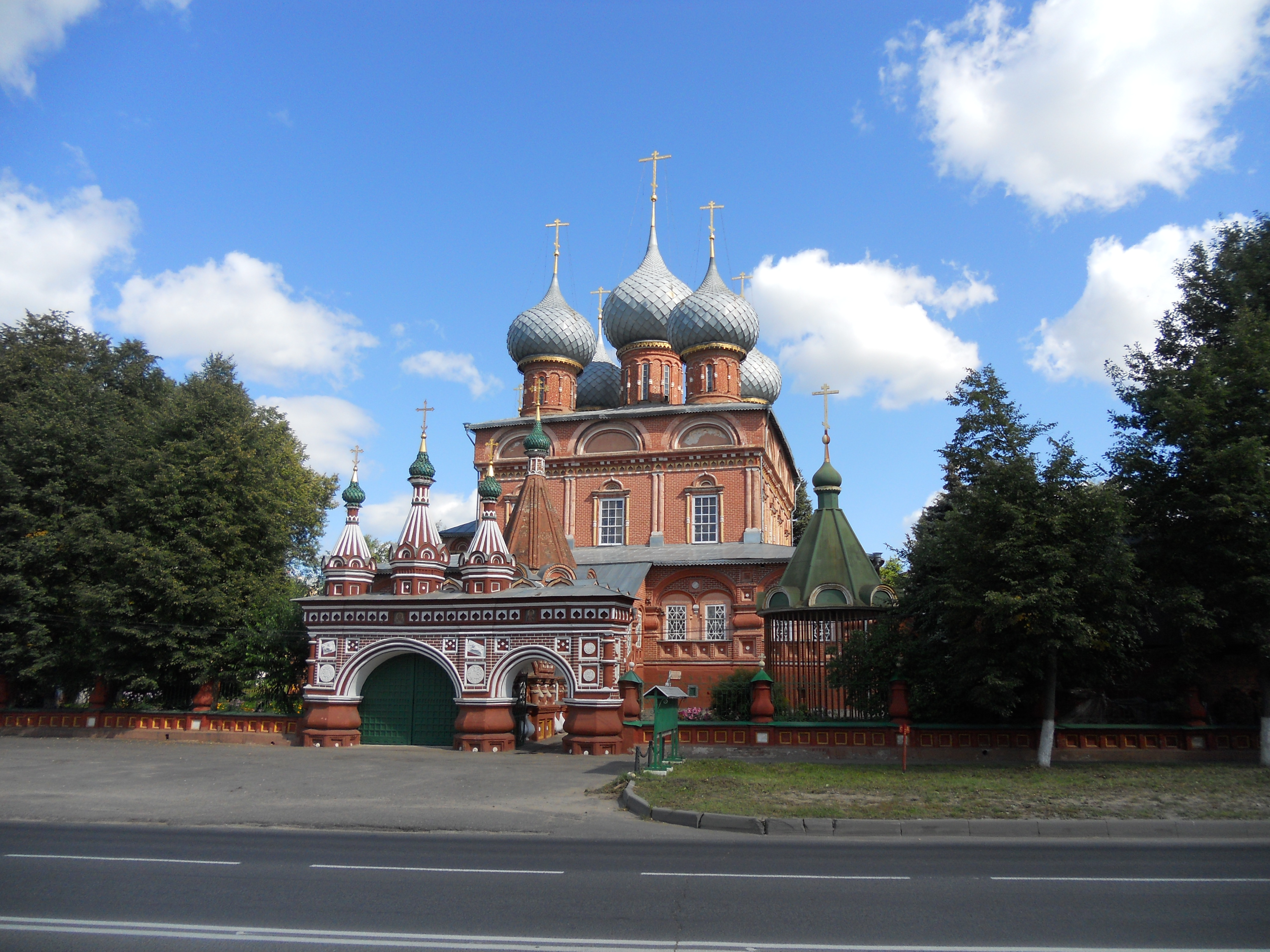
- Church of the Resurrection, Kostroma

Religion
- Affiliation: Russian Orthodox Church
- Region: Russia
- Ecclesiastical or organisational status: active

Location
- Location: Knyzhnyaa Debrya 37; Kostroma, Russia
- Interactive map of Church of the Intercession of the Holy Mother of God
- Coordinates: 57°45′20″N 40°56′55″E

Architecture
- Style: Russian
- Groundbreaking: 1645
- Completed: 1651
- Materials: stone

Church of the Resurrection is church of the Diocese of Kostroma of the Russian Orthodox Church in Kostroma, Russia, near the Volga River.

== History ==
The church was built in the middle of the 17th century, no later than 1652. According to legend, the first church "at the bottom of Debre" (the street where the church is located) was staged by the Prince of Kostroma, Knyaz Vasily Yaroslavich (1248–1276).

The architects who planned the church arrived from Yaroslavl and Veliky Ustyug. The church was painted shortly after the construction in 1650–1652 years. Presumably, paintings made by masters Arteli Vasili Zapokrovsky and frescos of the chape is believed to Gur Nikitin and his team of artists.

In the 1740s the church windows were painted, gallery openings laid and the west porch connected by a covered walkway to the holy gates.

Initially, when the church was built it had a bell tower. But in 1801, when the restructuring of the neighboring "warm" Znamensky temple, constituting a single complex of the Resurrection Church, the bell tower was demolished and in its place built a new one, adjacent to the Church of the Sign.

In Soviet times, the church operated until 1930. Then it was closed, and its walls made a granary, and in the basement there was a military warehouse. In 1946 the church was re-opened. According to the memoirs of contemporaries, the church had no floors and icons and windows were broken.

Over a quarter of a century (since 1964) a small church served as a cathedral of the diocese of Kostroma. Here, until 1991 remained one of the most revered shrines Kostroma - Feodorovskaya Icon of the Mother of God from the ruins in 1934, the Assumption Cathedral. In the years 1967–1969 restoration works were carried out.

In 1993 the Kostroma women's monastery was built next to the Church of the Resurrection in Kostroma.

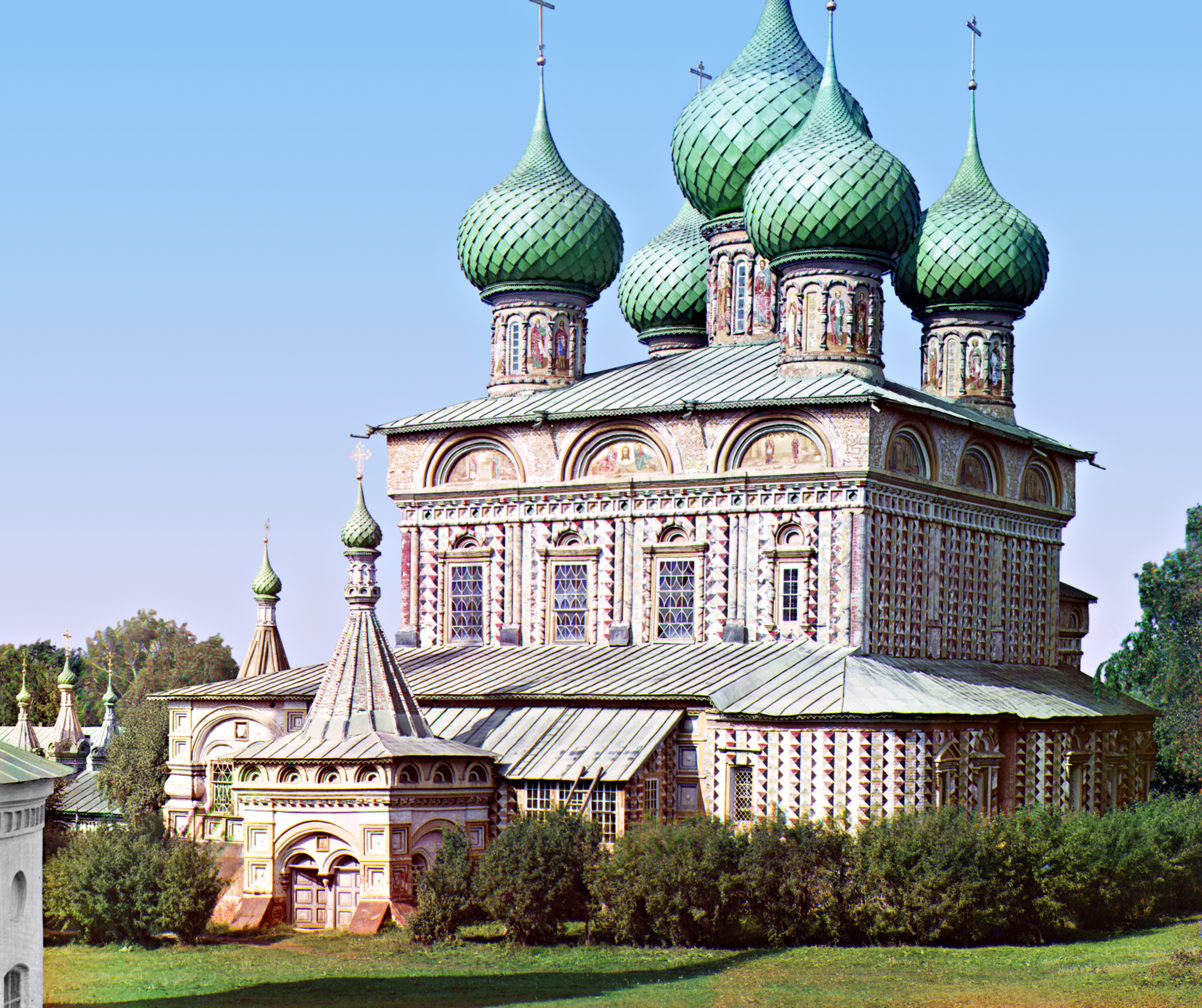
Kostroma: church of the Resurrection in 1910

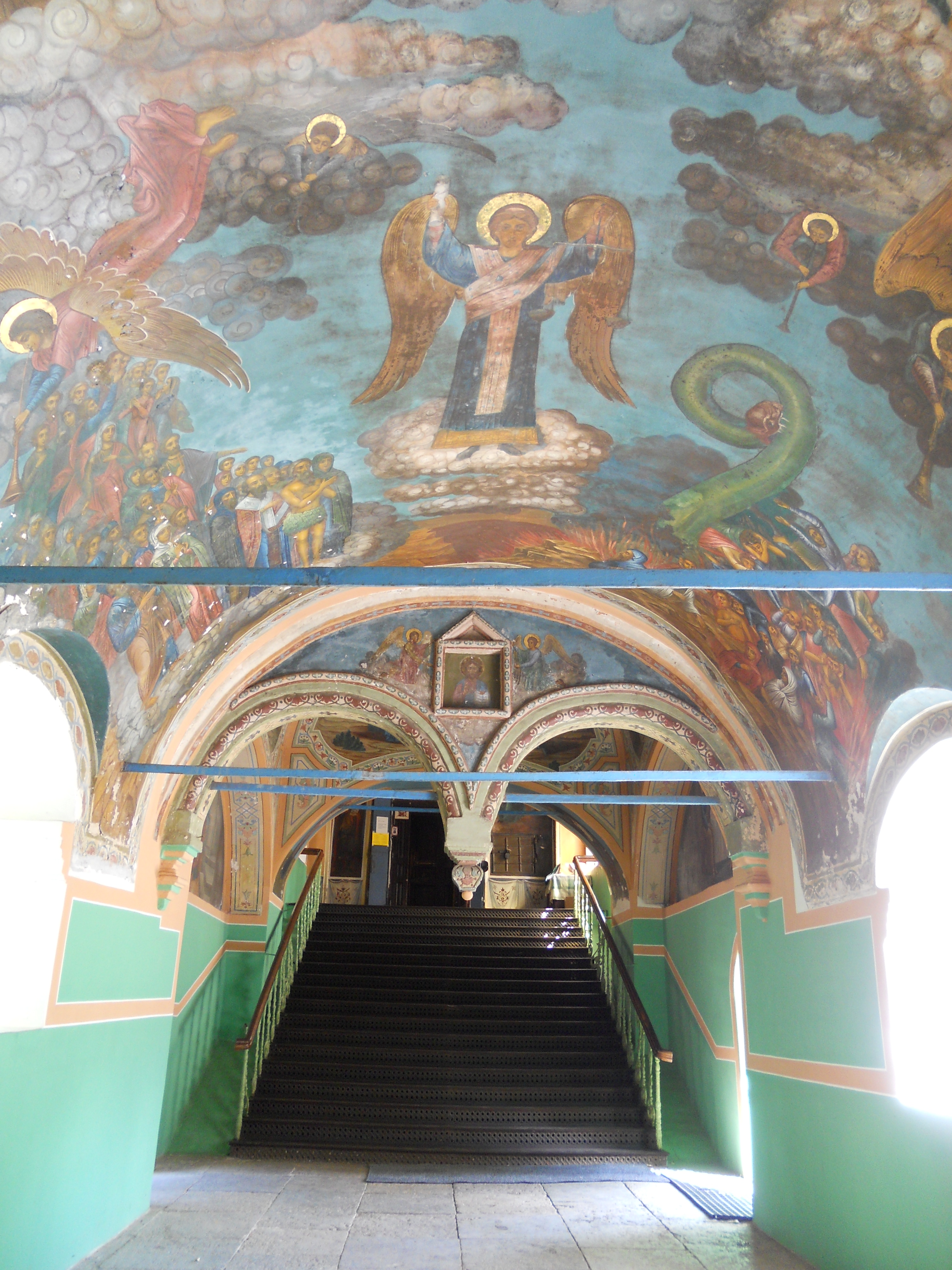
Interior of the church of the Resurrection (Kostroma)

== Architecture ==
The church building, with its cruciform plan, rests on four pillars covered by five domes, covering three apses. The interior is ancient and of a single style.

The interior volume is divided into four squares by pillars, separated by passages between them and stone arches in nine parts.

The "Holy Doors" provide access from the west side of the church and are built of brick with parts of white stone, in the form of two arches, one surmounting a large door and the other a small one opening along their entire length onto the roadway.

== Bibliography ==
- Бочков В. N. (V. N. Bochkov): Старая Кострома: рассказы об улицах, домах и людях- Эврика-М, 1997 - Kostroma (Kostromskai︠a︡ oblast, Russia) - 230 pages — ISBN 5-89362-001-1
