= Fyodorovskaya Church =

Coordinates: 57.60967°N 39.865608°E

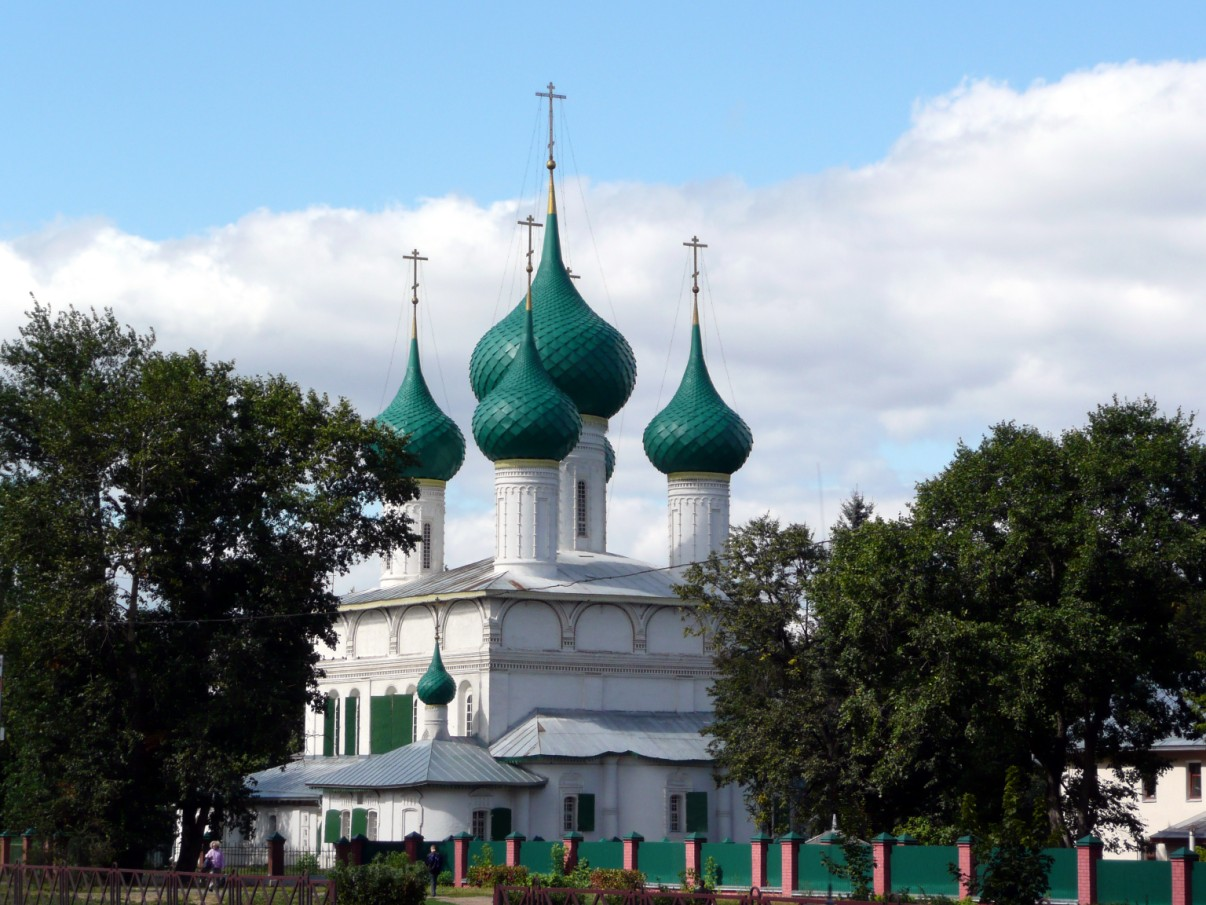
The church, as seen from Bolshaya Fyodorovskaya Street

The Fyodorovskaya Church (Фёдоровская церковь) is a penticupolar parish Russian Orthodox church built by ordinary parishioners on the right bank of the Kotorosl River in Yaroslavl between 1682 and 1687. It is dedicated to Theotokos Feodorovskaya, a miraculous icon from nearby Kostroma.

The building is notable as the first church in the region to be returned by the Soviets to the Russian Orthodox Church (in 1987). It served as the cathedral church of the ancient Yaroslavl-Rostov eparchy until the restored Dormition Cathedral was consecrated in 2010. During this period the relics of St. Theodore the Black and other local saints were kept there.

== History ==
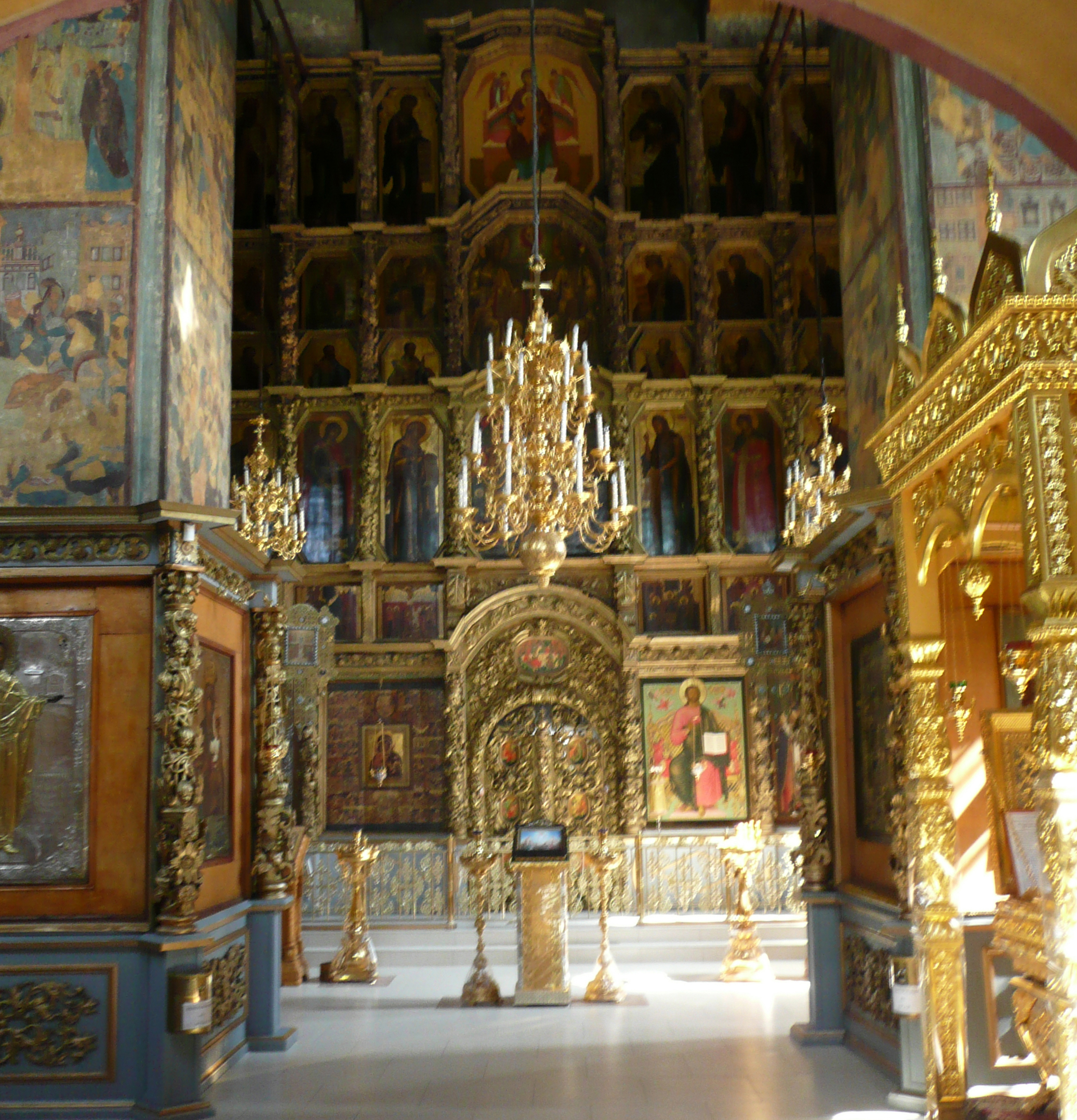
The interior of the church

A parish chronicle from the 18th century survives. It indicates that it was the Mother of God who appeared to a paralyzed parishioner, Ivan, and commanded the building of a church in Her name. Ivan was instructed to sail down the Volga to Kostroma and ask Guriy Nikitin, a famous icon painter, to make a replica of the miraculous icon of the Theotokos. This new image eventually helped cure Ivan, among many others.

The parishioners decided to model the new church on that of the Ascension of Christ. Its exterior ornamentation is basic but proportions are graceful. The elongated drums and domes are considerably higher than the cuboid structure of the church that supports them. An enclosed gallery and a porch were added to the main cube in the first third of the 18th century.

The interior is of traditional design. It has four piers and is entirely covered in frescoes dating from 1716. The intricately carved icon screen was made in 1705. Some of the icons are noted for their complex calendar and cosmological codes.

The church compound is fenced and has a smaller church with a belfry on the north side. This single-dome Penskaya church is dedicated to St. Nicholas, a patron saint of merchants. There is also a baptistery of recent construction on the grounds.

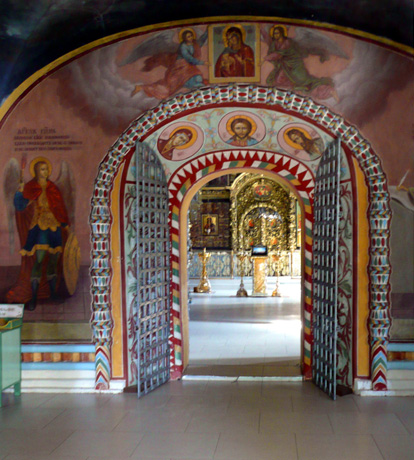
The main door

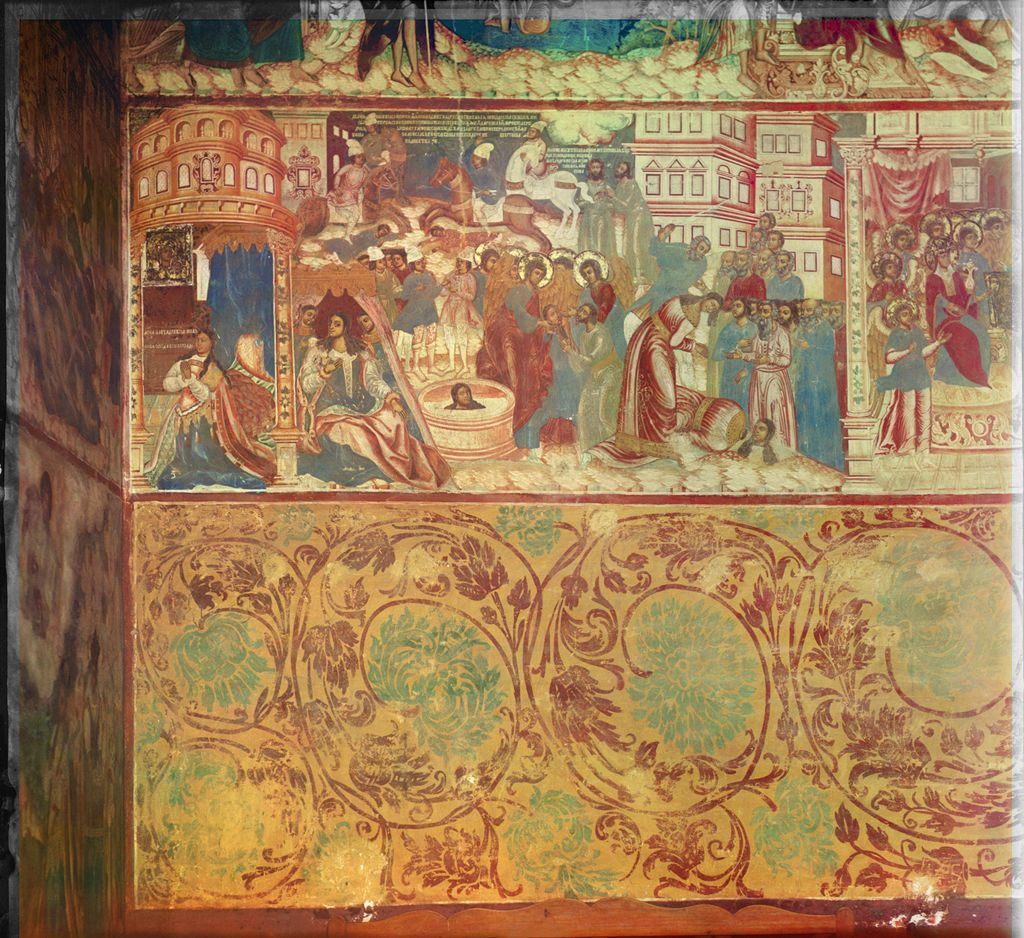
Wall paintings

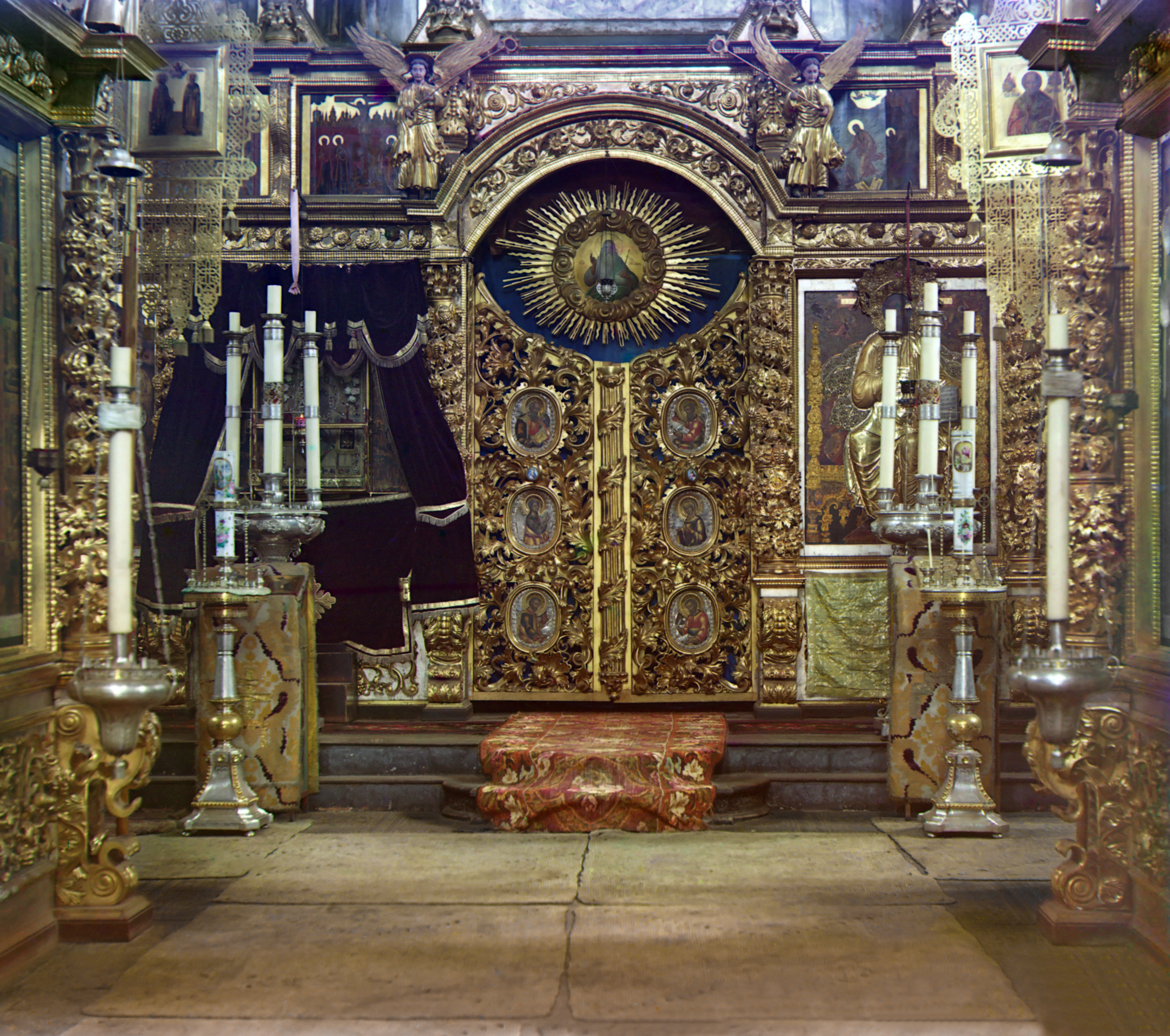
The icon screen (as photographed by Prokudin-Gorsky in the early 1900s)

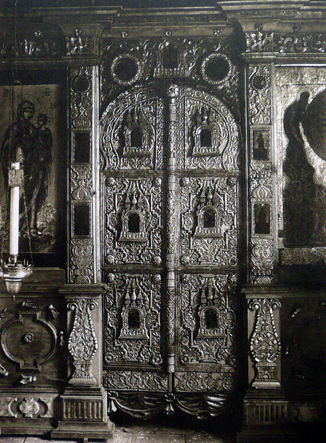
Royal Gates

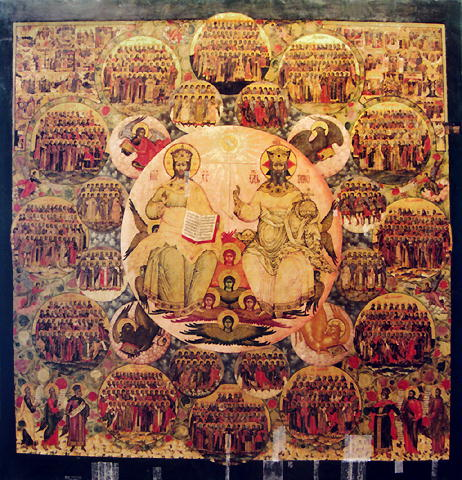
A menaion showing the Trinity in the center of the whole universe
