= Church of St. Nicholas Pensky =

Coordinates: 57.610302°N 39.865372°E

The Church of St. Nicholas "Pensky"
- Церковь Николая Чудотворца Пенская
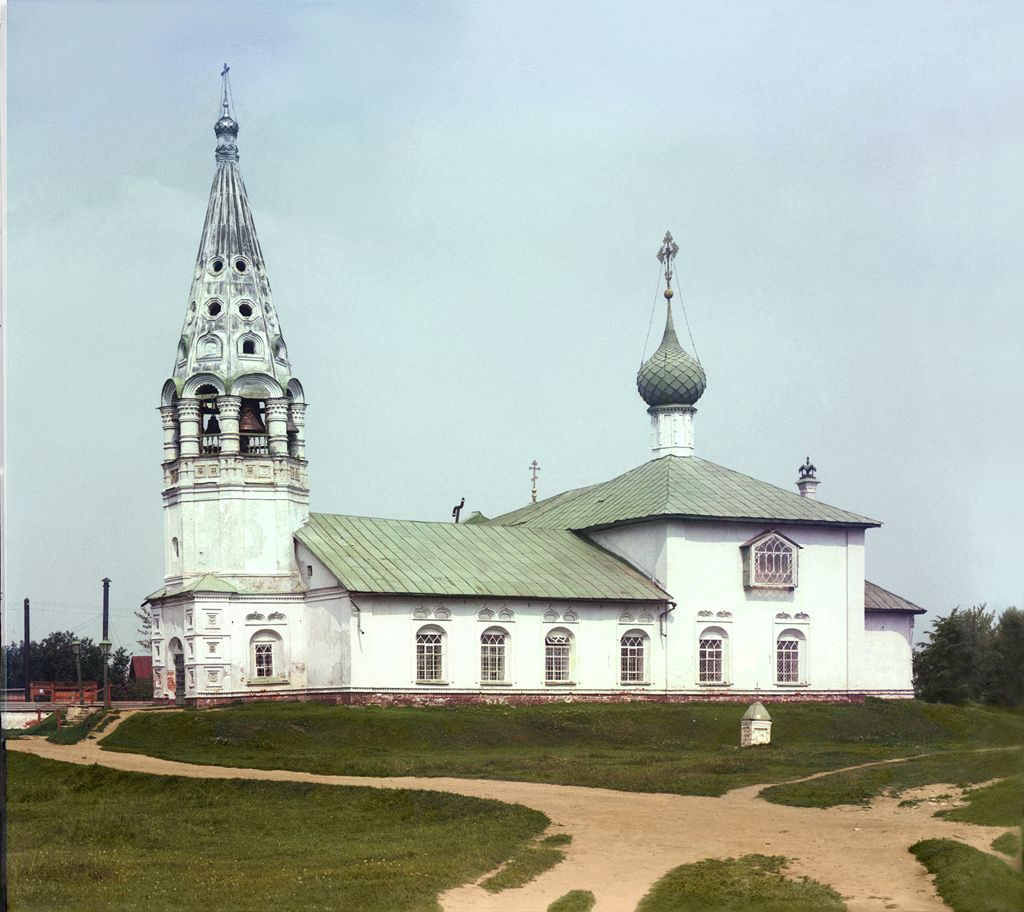
- A photograph made by Sergey Prokudin-Gorsky (1912). A little pillar in front of the church shows where the earlier church stood.
- The Church of St. Nicholas "Pensky"
- Location: Yaroslavl
- Country: Russia
- Denomination: Orthodoxy

Architecture
- Architectural type: Yaroslavl style
- Years built: 1689-1690

Administration
- Diocese: Diocese of Yaroslavl

The Church of St. Nicholas "Pensky" ("Nicholas-on-the-Stumps") is a smaller (winter) church of Fyodorovsky parish on the right bank of the Kotorosl River in Yaroslavl, in the district formerly known as Tolchkovo.

The tiny brick church represents a type of design known as the "ship", with an ornate bell tower in the west, connected by a low vestibule to the central cube with a single dome. It was constructed in 1689-90 in place of an earlier wooden church built in a cut-down grove 20 years earlier (hence the reference to tree stumps in the name). An ungainly chapel with a large entrance porch was added to the north wall in 1890. It is notable as the only church in Yaroslavl that remained open for worship throughout the Soviet period. The recent tombs of several local archbishops are near the south wall of the church.
