= Theophany Convent, Kostroma =

Coordinates: 57°46′23″N 40°55′30″E

Bogoyavlensky (Theophany) Convent
- Богоявленско-Анастасиин монастырь
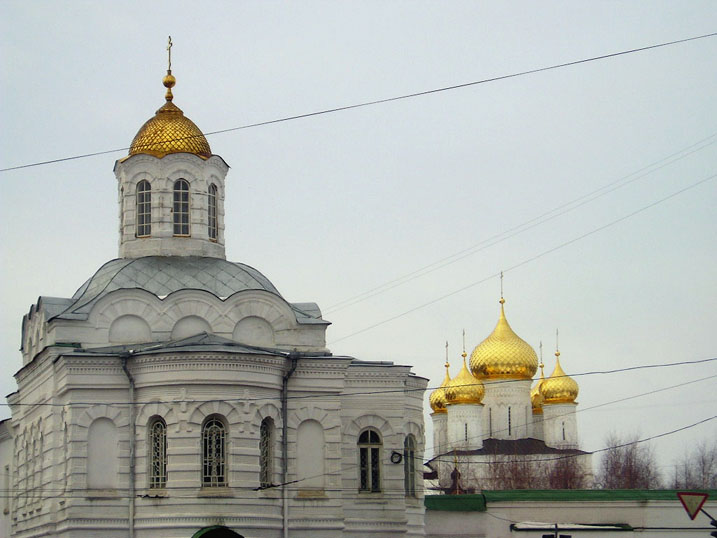
- 2006
- Bogoyavlensky (Theophany) Convent
- Location: Kostroma, Russia
- Website: https://богоявленско-анастасиин-м.рф/

History
- Founded: 1559

Bogoyavlensky Convent (Russian: Богоявленско-Анастасьин монастырь) is one of the most populous Russian Orthodox convents. It is situated in Kostroma and is known as the location of the ancient Feodorovskaya Icon of the Mother of God.

It was founded as Bogoyavlensky (Theophany) Monastery in the 15th century by Nikita, a disciple and a relative of St Sergius of Radonezh.

The five-domed katholikon of traditional Byzantine design was constructed under Ivan the Terrible, starting in 1559. One of the largest donors to the cathedral was Vladimir of Staritsa, a cousin of Ivan the Terrible, and the initiator of the construction of the cathedral was Hegumen Isaiah. The Tsar accused the father superior and some of the brethren of supporting his rival Vladimir of Staritsa and had them executed in 1570.

The monastery was besieged and taken by Aleksander Józef Lisowski during the Time of Troubles. The attack claimed the lives of 11 monks. A monastic house dates from the 17th century. The other buildings arose from the monastery's reconstruction in the Russian Revival style in the late 19th century. In 1863 the monastery was transformed into a convent.

After the October Revolution the convent was abolished and was not revived until the 1990s. The remains of the wall paintings in the katholikon were destroyed in a recent fire.

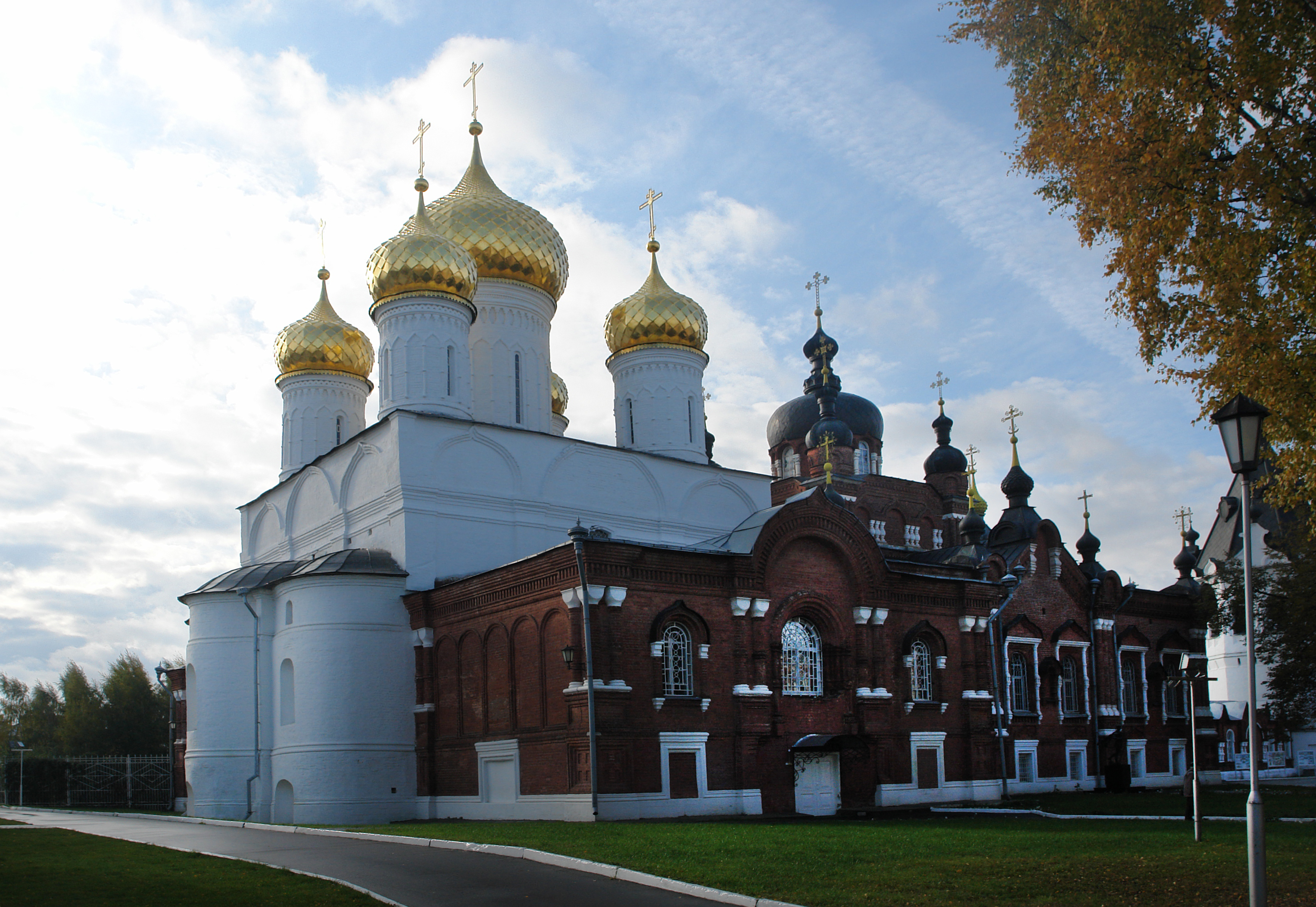
Bogoyavlensky Convent (Kostroma)

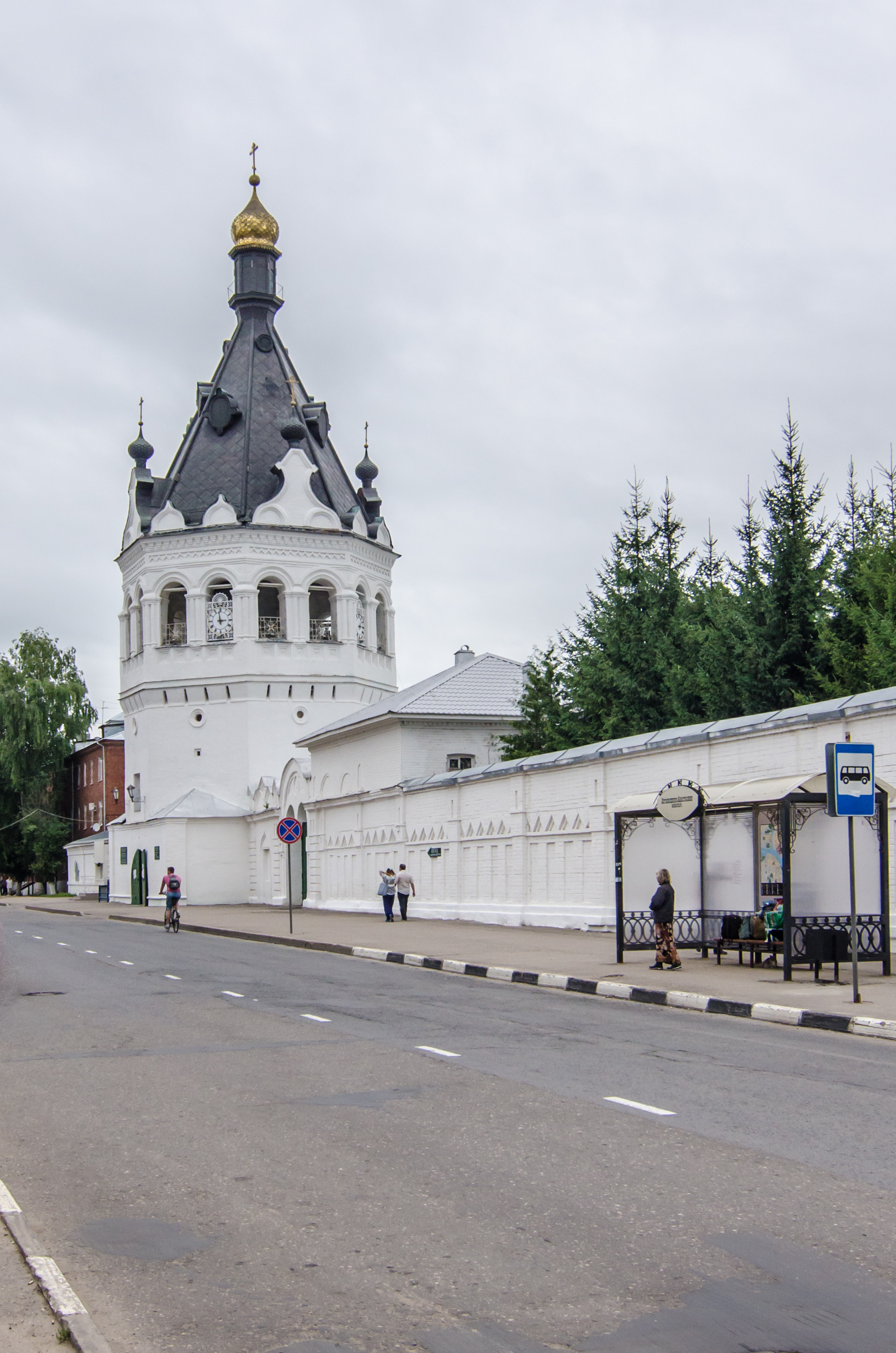
The tower of the XVII century, turned into a monastery bell tower in the XIX century

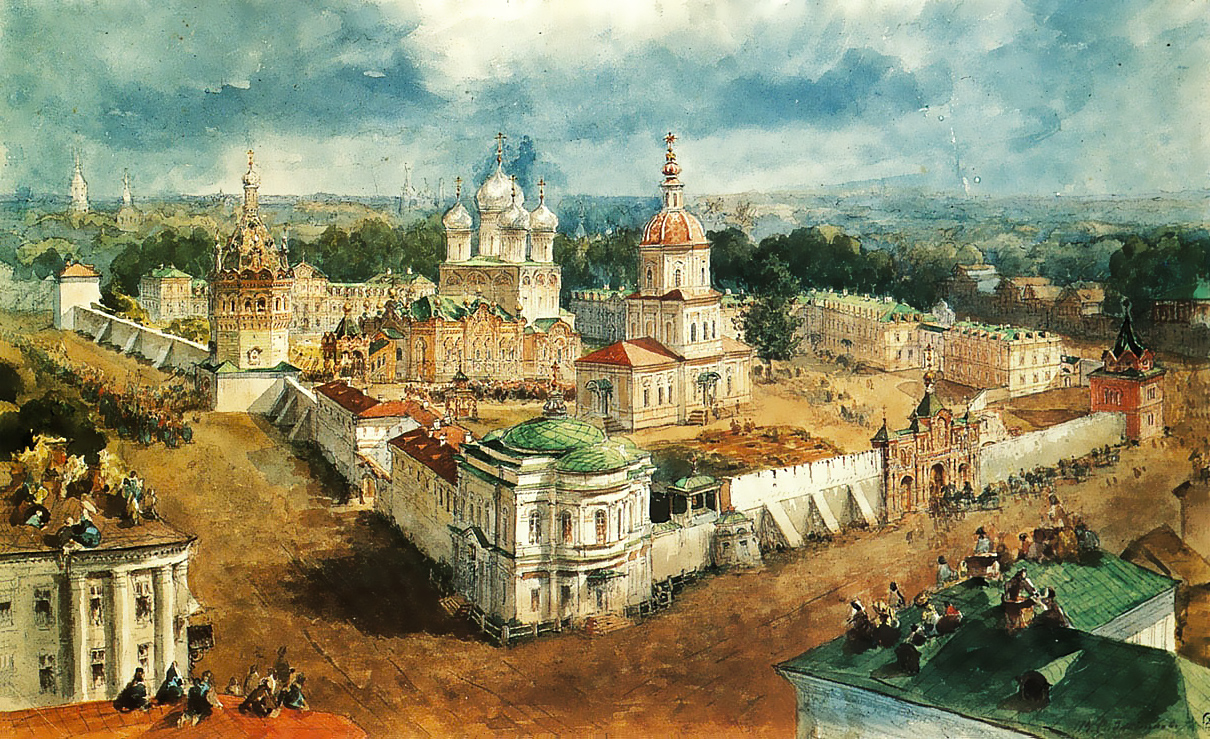
Vasily Sadovnikov. "View of the Bogoyavlensky Convent in Kostroma" (after 1865)
