= Diocese of Kostroma =

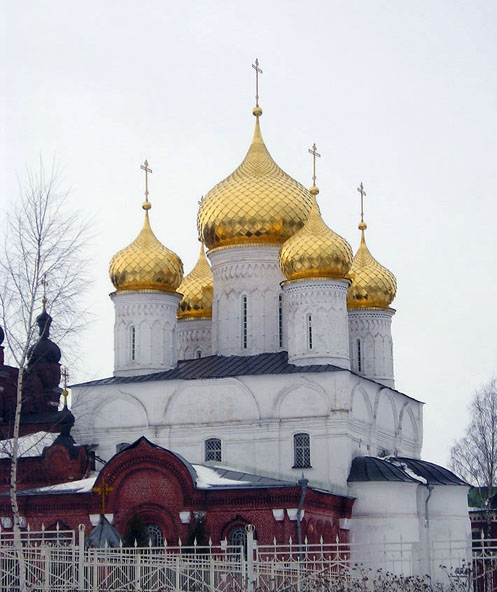
- The Epiphany Cathedral (1559-65)

Location
- Deaneries: 8
- Headquarters: Kostroma, Russia

Information
- Denomination: Eastern Orthodox
- Sui iuris church: Russian Orthodox Church
- Established: 16 July 1744
- Cathedral: Epiphany Cathedral
- Language: Old Church Slavonic

Current leadership
- Governance: Eparchy
- Bishop: Therapont (Kashin) since 25 December 2013

Website
- www.kostromaeparhia.ru

The Diocese of Kostroma (Russian: Костромская епархия, tr. Kostromskaja eparhija) is an eparchy of the Russian Orthodox Church in Russia. It combines parishes and monasteries within the Kostroma Oblast while the eparchial center lies in Kostroma. It was elevated to the rank of metropolitanate in 2016. Its suffragan is the Diocese of Galich. Current head of the diocese is metropolitan Therapont (Kashin).

The former eparchy's cathedral was the Assumption Cathedral in Kostroma while the current cathedrals include the Cathedrals of the Epiphany, St. Anastasia Monastery in Kostroma, and Galich Vvedensky.

== History ==
On June 18, 1744, the Synod sent a Humble Report to Empress Elizabeth, asking the Churches of the Saints for better governance and institutions within church decorum to be established in Vlidimir, Kostroma, Pereslavl and Tambov. On July 16, 1744, Empress Elizabeth Petrovna signed a decree establishing the four noble cities at the Kostroma episcopal. Simon Todorsky was appointed Bishop. As a member of the Holy Synod, it was necessary for him to stay in the capital as he awaited transfer on August 18, 1745, to the Department of Pskov.

According to the Synod's Report of June 18, 1744, the provinces of Kostroma and Galich had 786 churches, 27 monasteries and 8 nunneries.

With the transfer of Bishop Simon to Kostroma, Archimandrite Sylvester (Kulyabko) was appointed as the rector of the Kiev Theological Academy and consecrated Bishop of Kostroma and Galich in St. Petersburg on November 10, 1745. The new Bishop came under fire at the end of January 1746 and chose to settle in the Cathedral of Holy Trinity Ipatiev Monastery, which until 1918 was the official residence of the Kostroma Bishops.

From 1942 to 1946, the Kostroma diocese was ruled by Yaroslavl bishops - Archbishop John (Sokolov) and Archbishop Alexy (Sergeev). In 1989, there were 64 operating churches and not a single monastery in the diocese.

By the decision of the Holy Synod of December 27, 2016, the Galich diocese was separated from the diocese. The Kostroma diocese is included in the Kostroma Metropolis. The Synod decided to have the title of “Kostroma and Nerekhta” for the ruling bishop.
