= Nina Demme =

Soviet biologist and polar researcher (1902–1977)

- Нина Демме
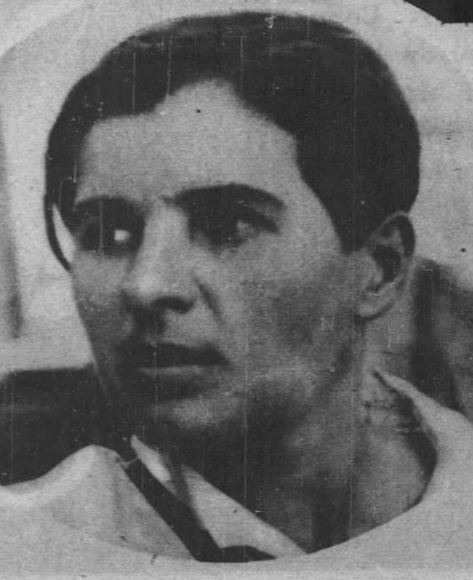
- Demme in 1932
- Born: Nina Petrovna Demme-Ryabtseva; 1902; Kostroma, Russian Empire
- Died: 1977 (aged 74–75); Leningrad, Russian SFSR, Soviet Union
- Other names: Nina Petrovna Demme, Nina Riabtzova-Demme
- Occupations: Polar explorer; biologist; ornithologist
- Years active: 1921–1959
- Family: von Medem

Nina Petrovna Demme (Russian: Нина Петровна Демме; 1902 – 16 March 1977) was a Soviet polar explorer, biologist, and ornithologist. She was one of the first women to explore the Arctic and take charge of a polar expedition. Raised in an polyamorous household in Kostroma, she attended the first women's gymnasium in Russia from 1907 to 1914 and then studied to become a teacher. After taking workers courses under Lenin's wife Nadezhda Krupskaya, she taught collectivism in the Ufa Governorate before settling in Leningrad in 1921 to study at the Geographical Institute. For eight years, she studied geography and biology, participating in numerous field trips on polar research.

Graduating in 1929, Demme went to work at the Arctic and Antarctic Research Institute and participated in a two-year expedition to Franz Josef Land, during which she was the only woman in the group. Chosen to lead an expedition to Severnaya Zemlya, known then as the Kamenev Islands, she and her team of three men mapped the western part of the archipelago and conducted research on the plants and animals. Returning to Leningrad in 1934, she researched the commercial collective farming potential of animals of the north and for several seasons studied black foxes and the possibilities of breeding eiders. Earning her Candidate's Degree in biology in 1946, she became a professor but was discontent to remain in the classroom and continued to make research trips until she retired in 1959. In her retirement, she painted, and planted a large garden of flowers and trees, which she maintained until her death in 1977.

== Early life ==
Nina was born in 1902 in Kostroma in the Russian Empire to Maria Ivanovna Ryabtsova and Ludwig Fedorovich Demme. She was an illegitimate child of a polyamorous household which was made up of her father's first wife and nine children, and her mother's five children. Her half-siblings were Valya and Kolya named after her mother's first husband, a German surnamed Huber. Nina, Julia, and Seryozha were full siblings from her mother's relationship with her father. Because her blood siblings were all illegitimate, they were registered with the family patronymic Petrovna, after her godfather Petr Ryabtsov, and with their mother's surname, Ryabtsov. Forged papers, showing her name as Nina Petrovna Demme-Ryabtseva, allowed Demme to be the only child to carry her father's surname or enter high school (gymnasium).

Her father was a German noble, originally named Ludwig von Medem, who changed his surname to Demme and arrived in Russia where he ran a bicycle shop in Galich. Soon he relocated to Kostroma and began a relationship with Ryabtsova, who managed a brewery left to her by her first husband. After he had sent for his first family in Germany, the blended families rented the house which would later become the Pushkin Library in Kostroma. Ryabtsova, Ludwig, and her children occupied the top floor of the building, and his first family lived in the garden house. Later, he built a house for the mixed family at #23 Pastukhovskaya. The relationships between his wives and children were friendly and they all worked together on the farm, which produced poultry, as well as fruits and flowers for local sale. Ludwig Demme was fond of birds and raised several rare breeds of pigeons, for which he was widely known.

== Education ==
After completing her primary education, Demme entered the private Grigorov Female Gymnasium (Russian: Григоровскую женскую гимназию), the first women's high school in Russia. The school was funded by nobles from the Kostroma Oblast, but because her documents listed Demme as the daughter of a peasant, she was ridiculed. Girls who attended the school were preparing to become teachers and studied dance, music, and needlework, as well as French, German, and Russian languages; geography; literature; mathematics; physics; and religion. She graduated in 1914 and then entered the teacher training seminary in Kostroma. In 1917, while participating in a community mowing project during her schooling, Demme learned of the Bolsheviks and quickly became a founding member of the Komsomol in Kostroma. By 1919, she was a leader in the Komsomol, entering the labor school commune and participating in the provincial committee. In 1920, she went to Moscow to take workers courses under Nadezhda Krupskaya, Lenin's wife, and studied collectivism. When she completed the courses, she was sent to the Ufa Governorate in the Ural Mountains to pass on the information to the masses.

In 1921, Demme moved to Leningrad to study at the Geographical Institute. Among her instructors were Lev Berg, Alexei Bialynitsky-Birulya, Białynicki-Birula Vladimir Bogoraz, Alexei Borisyak, Yakov Edelstein, Boris Fedtschenko, Alexander Fersman, Dmitry Nalivkin, and Sergey Neustruev. For eight years she studied at the institute, which later became the geography department of Leningrad University. During research trips, she participated in expeditions to the Caucasus and Crimea and worked on projects including road construction in Leningrad and dog training along the railway from Termez to Dushanbe. In 1926, Demme led an expedition to the Kara Sea; in 1927, she conducted research in the Urals; afterwards, she completed field work in Central Asia around Amu Darya to prepare for land reforms. While she was in school, she met and married fellow student and polar explorer Ivan Markieltevich Ivanov. Her husband had been part of the rescue attempt in 1928 to save Umberto Nobile, an Italian polar explorer, and his crew after they crashed their dirigible balloon.

== Career ==
=== Arctic exploration ===
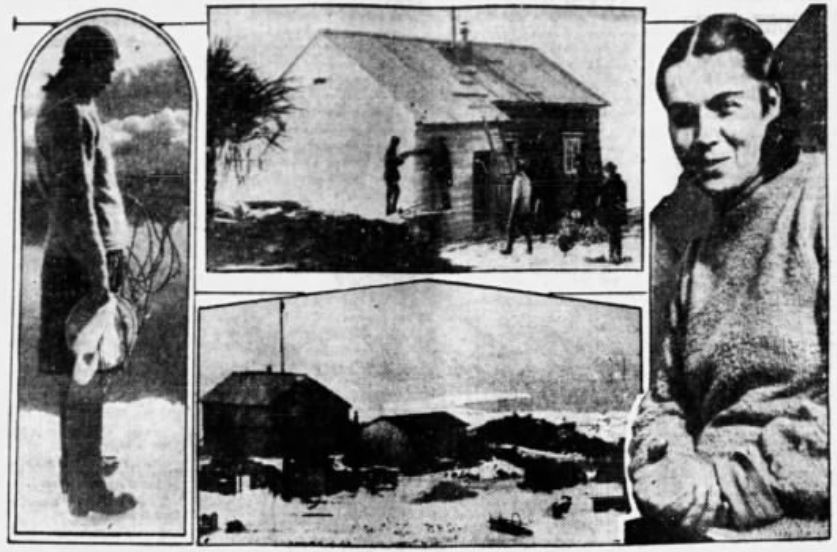
Nina Demme on the 1931 expedition to Franz Josef Land. Photograph indicates these were the first photos sent from the expedition: left Demme taking water samples; Middle the camp; right Demme seated

Locations of Demme's expeditions in the Arctic.

In 1929, Demme graduated and went to work at the Arctic and Antarctic Research Institute which was founded in 1930. Because of her extensive experience and research background, Demme was selected to participate in an expedition on the icebreaker George Sedov, which planned to winter on Franz Josef Land. Ivanov was sent to manage the polar station in Tikhaya Bay on Hooker Island, with the 11 scientists being led by Otto Schmidt. Demme was the only woman among them (Note: The 11 members of the crew included Ivanov, geographer and the leader; Danilov, musher; Demme, biologist; Golubenkov, meteorologist; Ioylev, radio operator; Khatanzey and Kuznetsov, Nenet hunters; Dr. Kutlyaev, camp physician, who was studying polar effects on human blood; Mukhin, hydrologist; Ploskonosov, mechanic; and Postanov, cook.) and international news coverage at the time claimed she was the first woman to have explored the Arctic. (Note: Demme was not the first woman to explore the Arctic. Among others, Tatiana Pronchishcheva explored with her husband on the Kamchatka Peninsula from 1733 to 1736; Yerminiya Zhdanko and Juliette Jean-Sessin (Russian: Жюльетта Жан-Сессин) were lost on explorations in 1912; and Louise Arner Boyd made six expeditions between 1928 and 1941 to places like East Greenland, Franz Josef Land, Jan Mayen Land and Spitsbergen. Boyd also had led an expedition in 1931, after Demme's 1926 trip but prior to her 1932 trip, and Irina Rusinova (Russian: Ирина Леонидовна Русинова) wintered in the Arctic in Novaya Zemlya in 1928, prior to Demme.) Her work involved both geographical and biological studies, and the crew wintered for two years on the island. When not making expeditions to study the wildlife and plants, Demme assisted the hydrologist in his measurements. During the expedition, Demme and Ivanov divorced, and she married another of the scientists. When they returned from the trip, that marriage ended, and she married Gabriel Ignatievich Ioylev, a radio operator. (Note: Аветисов notes that there is sourcing for Demme's marriage to Ivanov on the web, but the archives of the Arctic and Antarctic Research Institute indicate only that her husband was Petr Gavrilovich Skvortsov (Russian: Скворцов Петр Гаврилович). He also states that she wrote no personal information in her memoirs, which is confirmed by Николаева. Her relatives stated in an interview with Николаева that Demme was married at least four times and the known husband's names were "Ganya, Petr, Vanya, and Volodya".)

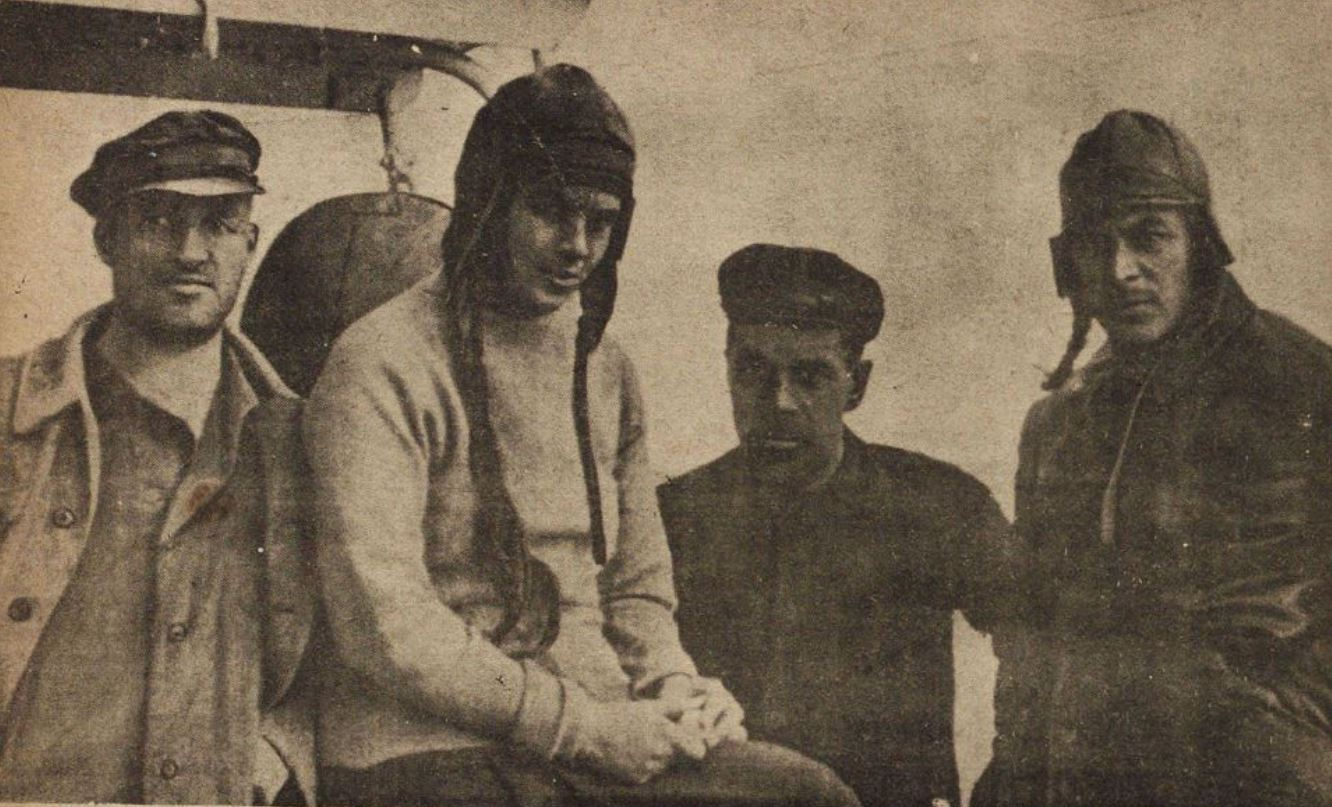
Nina Demme and her crew preparing to leave for Severnaya Zemlya in 1932

In 1932, she led a team of three men, including a hunter, meteorologist, and her husband, Ioylev, the radio operator, to winter in the Kamenev Islands, and newspapers reported that she had been the first woman to lead a polar expedition. The group sailed on the Roussanov, arriving on 14 August and settling into the cabin which had a large bedroom with bunk beds and a library, as well as a large dining table, where they listened to concerts and news broadcasts each evening during dinner. She was made governor of the archipelago and had the authority to direct commerce, immigration, and other affairs of state. The group was to remain one winter and evaluate the commercial possibilities for the flora and fauna of the islands. They gathered geological and botanical samples, studied the various animals on their expeditions, and mapped the western part of Severnaya Zemlya. As icebreakers were unable to reach, them the team ended up spending a second year in the Arctic. Various mishaps befell the crew, including one when, while out hunting, the men mistook Demme for a polar bear and she began to sing an aria from La traviata so they would know she was not their prey. In September 1934, Alexander Alexiev, a government pilot, flew from Siberia and was able to extract Demme and her crew, as well as Boris Lavrov and his pilot, who had been on an expedition of the Lena River before their plane crashed and they walked 185 miles to reach the Kamenev station.

=== Academic career ===
Returning to Leningrad, Demme began post-graduate studies at the Arctic and Antarctic Research Institute, where she also taught courses in biology and zoology. She was interested in researching the commercial collective farming potential of animals of the north and for several seasons studied black foxes. Because she could not get the institute to finance her expeditions, Demme chartered small fishing boats to take her to remote Arctic huts so that she could carry out her research. Beginning around 1940, she utilized methods established in Iceland to create experimental eider farms in Novaya Zemlya and on Vaygach Island. By setting up nesting shelters and killing the predators of the birds, locals under her leadership were able to collect 5,354 kilograms (11,804 lb) of eiderdown over a five-year period. Demme completed her dissertation, Гнездовые колонии гаги обыкновенной на Новой Земле и организация гагачьего хозяйства (Nesting Colonies of the Common Eider on Novaya Zemlya and the Organization of the Eiderdown Economy) in 1946, earning her Candidate's Degree in biology.

Demme was made an associate professor in 1949, but did not like the confinement of the classroom. She continued to hire small commercial vessels to allow her to study wildlife in the Arctic into the 1950s. In 1949, she conducted research in the Kandalaksha Nature Reserve on the White Sea, extending her work on eiders. At the reserve, she attempted to develop domesticated hatcheries, which she had unsuccessfully tried to establish in Novaya Zemlya. Though successful, the group of chicks she brought back to Leningrad at the end of the season failed to thrive and all died. In 1952, Demme made her last trip to the Arctic, working in the northern parts of the Gulf of Ob in Siberia, and focusing on raising animals there. She did not return to the Kandalaksha Reserve, though others continued to study eider chicks there. Though she was not involved, her experimental eiderdown farms operated until 1954, when they were closed and the native inhabitants of Novaya Zemlya were removed in preparation for nuclear tests. In 1959, she retired and wrote her autobiography. She was allowed to buy a summer house on the Black Sea coast and chose a place between Sochi and Tuapse near Volkonskaya, where she built a home and an extensive garden, which had various kinds of flowers and trees. An accomplished musician and skilled artist, she also created paintings.

== Death and legacy ==
Demme died on 16 March 1977 in Leningrad from phlegmon after she was given an injection for a congenital heart defect. She was cremated there, and her remains were taken to Kostroma for burial. The family was unable to convince local authorities to allocate marble for a tombstone. In 2017, her grave was located in the local cemetery on Kostromskaya Street. She is remembered as one of the first women polar explorers. There has been renewed interest in the 21st century in her work on eiderdown production.

== Selected works ==
- Riadtzova-Demme, Nina (8 January 1931). "Arctic Is Described by Woman Explorer (2 parts)". The Miami Herald. Miami, Florida. United Press International. pp. 1, 5 – via Newspapers.com.
- Riadtzova-Demme, Nina (2 December 1931). "'Northernmost Woman in World' Tells of Year Spent Near North Pole: Its Beauties and Hazards". Columbus Telegram. Columbus, Nebraska. United Press International. p. 3 – via Newspapers.com.
- Демме-Рябцова, Нина Петровна (1946). Гнездовые колонии гаги обыкновенной на Новой Земле и организация гагачьего хозяйства [Nesting Colonies of the Common Eider on Novaya Zemlya and the Organization of the Eiderdown Economy] (Thesis) (in Russian). Leningrad.
- Демме, Н.П. (November 1947). "Бобры на р. Сеза Архангельской области". Природа (in Russian) (11). Moscow: Академиздатцентр «Наука»: 73–75. ISSN 0032-874X.
