= Feodorovskaya Icon of the Mother of God =

Patron icon of the Romanov family

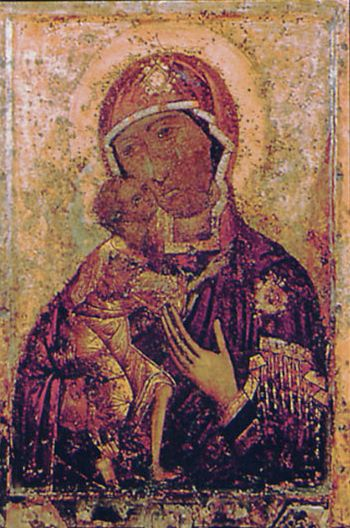
Original icon from Epiphany Monastery in Kostroma

The Feodorovskaya Icon of the Mother of God (Russian: Феодоровская икона Божией Матери, Feodorovskaya ikona Bozhiyey Materi), also known as Our Lady of Saint Theodore and the Black Virgin Mary of Russia, is the patron icon of the Romanov family. It is one of the most venerated icons in the Upper Volga region. Her feast days are March 14 (27) and August 29.

== Church lore ==
Since the Feodorovskaya follows the same Byzantine Eleusa (Tender Mercy) type as the Theotokos of Vladimir, pious legends declared it a copy of that famous image, purportedly created by Saint Luke. In Greek, Theotokos means "God-bearer". At the beginning of the XII century it was kept in an old wooden chapel near the city of Kitezh.

It is believed that, before the Mongol invasion of Rus, the icon was kept in a monastery near the town of Gorodets-on-the-Volga. After the Mongols sacked and burnt the town, the icon disappeared and was given up for lost.

Several months later, on 16 August 1239, Prince Vasily of Kostroma wandered while hunting in a forest. While trying to find his way out of a thicket, he saw an icon concealed among fir branches. When he reached out to touch it, the icon mysteriously rose up in the air. The awestruck prince informed the citizens of Kostroma about the miracle he had witnessed and returned with a crowd of people to the forest. They fell prostrate before the icon and prayed to the Theotokos. They carried the icon to the city and placed it in the Assumption Cathedral. A conflagration destroyed the cathedral and most of its icons soon thereafter, but the Feodorovskaya was found intact on the third day after the fire.

The people of Gorodets, at a distance to the east from Kostroma, learned about the miracle of the survival of the icon in the fire. They recognized the newly found icon as the one that used to be in their church. Church legends differ as to why the icon was named after Saint Theodore Stratelates (Russian: Феодор Стратилат, Feodor Stratilat), not to be confused with Theodore Tyro). One explanation is that, during Vasily's absence in the forest, several residents of Kostroma claimed to have seen an apparition of Saint Theodore come up to the city with an icon in his hands.

== A wedding gift? ==
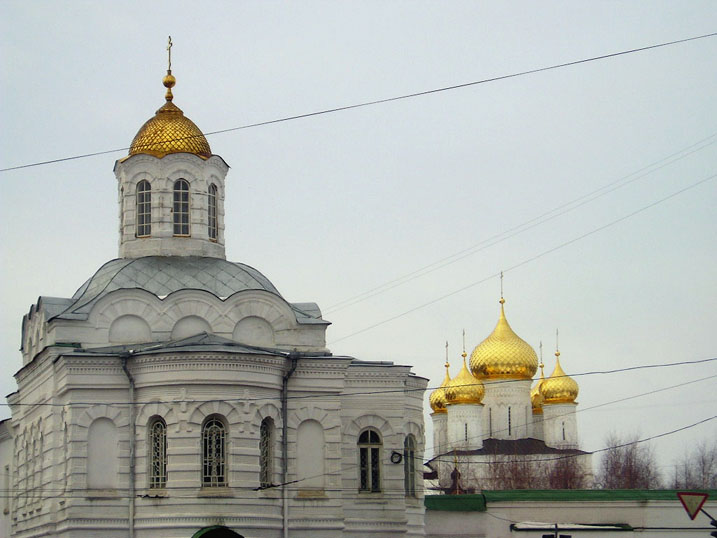
16th-century Epiphany Monastery in Kostroma, where the icon is on exhibit today

Since the icon was overwritten several times during its history, by the time of the Russian Revolution of 1917, the image had nearly disappeared. Art historians disagree about when and where the icon was created. Some propose an early 11th-century date; others date it as late as the turn of the 14th century. On the reverse side of the Feodorovskaya is an image representing Saint Paraskeva, a saint whose veneration started in the Novgorod Republic at the turn of the 13th century.

Scholars believe that the image of Saint Paraskeva is contemporaneous with the image of the Theotokos on the other side. This dating seems to confirm the Novgorodian origin of the icon, as it was only in the 15th century that the veneration of Saint Paraskeva spread to other parts of the country. The saint's noble dress may indicate that the icon was intended as a wedding gift to a princess whose patroness saint was Saint Paraskeva. According to Vasily Tatishchev, the only such princess known in the Rurikid family was Alexandra of Polotsk, the wife of Saint Alexander Nevsky of Novgorod.

The feast day of St. Alexandra coincides with that of Saint Paraskeva (20 March). In the Rurikid family, it was customary for a groom to present his bride an icon representing her patron saint. On these grounds, Byzantine expert Fyodor Uspensky concluded that the Feodorovskaya was presented by Alexander Nevsky to his wife on the occasion of their wedding in 1239.

If this theory is correct, the revered image of the Theotokos could have been commissioned by Alexander's father, Yaroslav II of Russia. His Christian name was Feodor (Феодор) and his patron saint was Theodore Stratelates.

There may have been several reasons why the icon could have surfaced in Gorodets or Kostroma. It is known that Alexander Nevsky had a palace in Gorodets and that he died in this town.

== Veneration ==
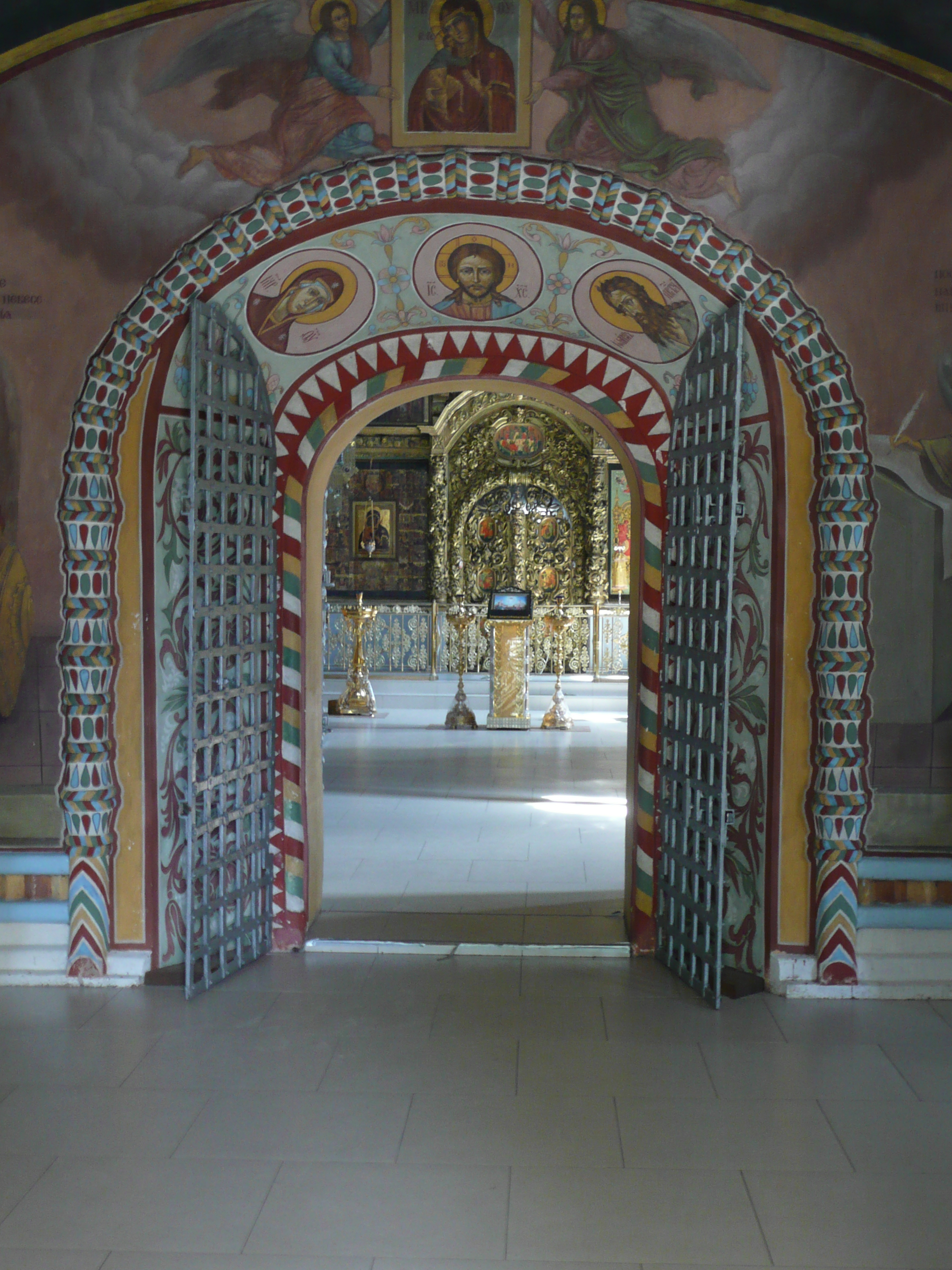
Fyodorovskaya Church in Yaroslavl (1682–1687)

Up to the 17th century, the icon was little known outside Gorodets and Kostroma. After 1613, its fame spread when the adolescent Mikhail Romanov had been elected as the new Russian tsar. Romanov lived in Kostroma with his mother, Xenia, who had been forced by the regent Boris Godunov to "take the veil" (join a convent and withdraw from public life). At first the nun advised her only son to stay in Kostroma and decline the offer of the Monomakh's Cap, or the position of tsar. She noted that three previous tsars had been either murdered or disgraced. Ksenia blessed her son by giving him a copy of the Feodorovskaya. She asked the icon to protect Mikhail and his royal descendants. The young tsar took a copy of the icon with him to Moscow, where it came to be regarded as the holy protectress of the Romanov dynasty.

Apart from Kostroma, the Feodorovskaya has been venerated in nearby Yaroslavl, where some of the oldest copies of the icon may be found.

In 1681, the icon appeared in a dream to Ivan Pleshkov, who had been paralysed for 12 years. He was commanded to go to Kostroma, procure a copy of the icon, bring it back to Yaroslavl and to build a church for its veneration. As soon as he was cured of palsy, Pleshkov commissioned Gury Nikitin, the most famous wall-painter of 17th-century Russia, who hailed from Kostroma, to paint a copy of the miraculous icon. The Fyodorovskaya Church was built to house the icon, with funds provided by ordinary people. A treatise details its construction and the miracles attributed to the icon in Yaroslavl. The church was consecrated on 24 July 1687. After the Communists destroyed the Dormition Cathedral of Yaroslavl during the Russian Revolution, the Fyodorovskaya Church served as the cathedral for the city and the archdiocese of Rostov, the oldest in Russia. The cathedral was rebuilt in 2005.

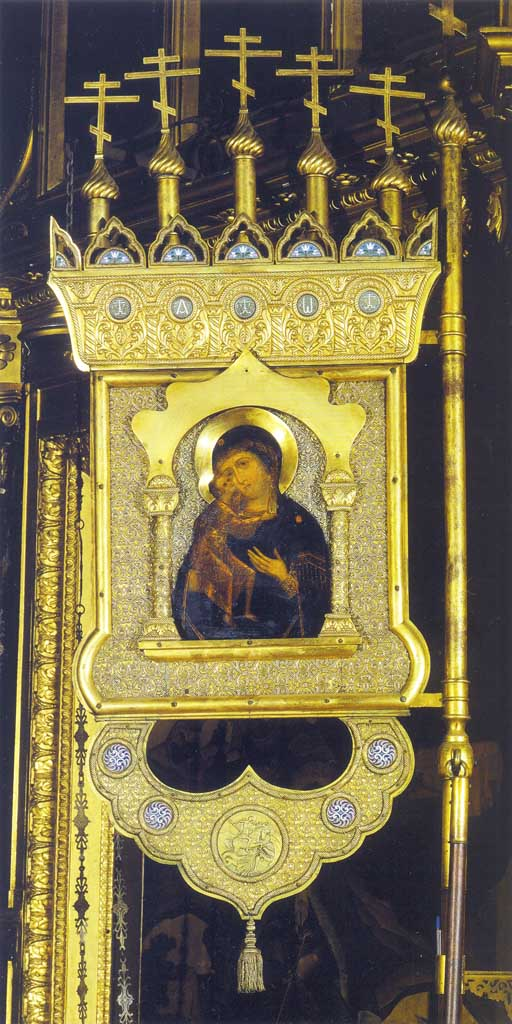
Metallic khorugv (processional banner) of the Theotokos of Saint Theodore, Moscow (1916)

Another copy of the icon has been venerated in Gorodets, especially after the Feodorovsky Monastery was re-established in the early 18th century. A new copy of the icon was brought to it from Kostroma. This image was fitted into a golden riza inlaid with precious stones, so as to rival the original by its sumptuous decoration. During the annual Makariev Fair, the icon was brought for veneration to Nizhny Novgorod.

Western Christian women who married into the House of Romanov and converted to Russian Orthodoxy often took Feodorovna as patronymic in honour of the Feodorovskaya icon. Examples include two empresses Maria Feodorovna (Sophie Dorothea of Württemberg and Dagmar of Denmark); two empresses Alexandra Feodorovna (Alix of Hesse and by Rhine and Charlotte of Prussia); and grand duchesses Anna Feodorovna (Juliane of Saxe-Coburg-Saalfeld), Victoria Feodorovna (Victoria Melita of Saxe-Coburg and Gotha) and Elizabeth Feodorovna (Elisabeth of Hesse and by Rhine).

When the tercentenary of the Romanov dynasty was celebrated in 1913, Nicholas II of Russia commissioned a copy of the Gorodets icon, which he placed at the Royal Cathedral of Our Lady Saint Theodore, constructed to a design by Vladimir Pokrovsky in the town of Tsarskoye Selo. It is said that Nicholas II could not have had a copy from the original image because the icon in Kostroma had blackened so badly that the image was hardly visible. This was interpreted as a bad sign for the Romanov dynasty. Indeed, the Romanovs were dethroned four years later during the Russian Revolution.

Unlike the other great icons of Russia, the Feodorovskaya was not transferred to a museum, because the image was impossible to discern. The Black Virgin was given to the sect of obnovlentsy, which had it restored in Moscow in 1928. After the sect was dissolved in 1944, the icon reverted to the Russian Orthodox Church. It deposited the icon in the famous Resurrection Church on the Lowlands in Kostroma. In 1991 the icon was moved from there to the revived Epiphany Cathedral in the same city. Recently encased in a new chasuble, the icon is still venerated at the convent associated with the cathedral.

== See also ==
- Eleusa icon
