= Tolchkovo =

Tolchkovo Толчково
- Village
- Location within Ivanovo Oblast Location within Russia
- Coordinates: 57°00′N 41°21′E
- Country: Russia
- Region: Ivanovo Oblast
- District: Ivanovsky District
- Time zone: UTC+3:00

Tolchkovo (Russian: Толчково) is a rural locality (a village) in Ivanovsky District, Ivanovo Oblast, Russia. Population: 34 (2010 census);

== Geography ==
This rural locality is located 2 kilometres (1.2 mi) from Ivanovo (the district's administrative centre and capital of Ivanovo Oblast) and 265 kilometres (165 mi) from Moscow. Nefedyevo is the nearest rural locality.
