= Kostroma =

City in Kostroma Oblast, Russia

Kostroma Кострома
- City
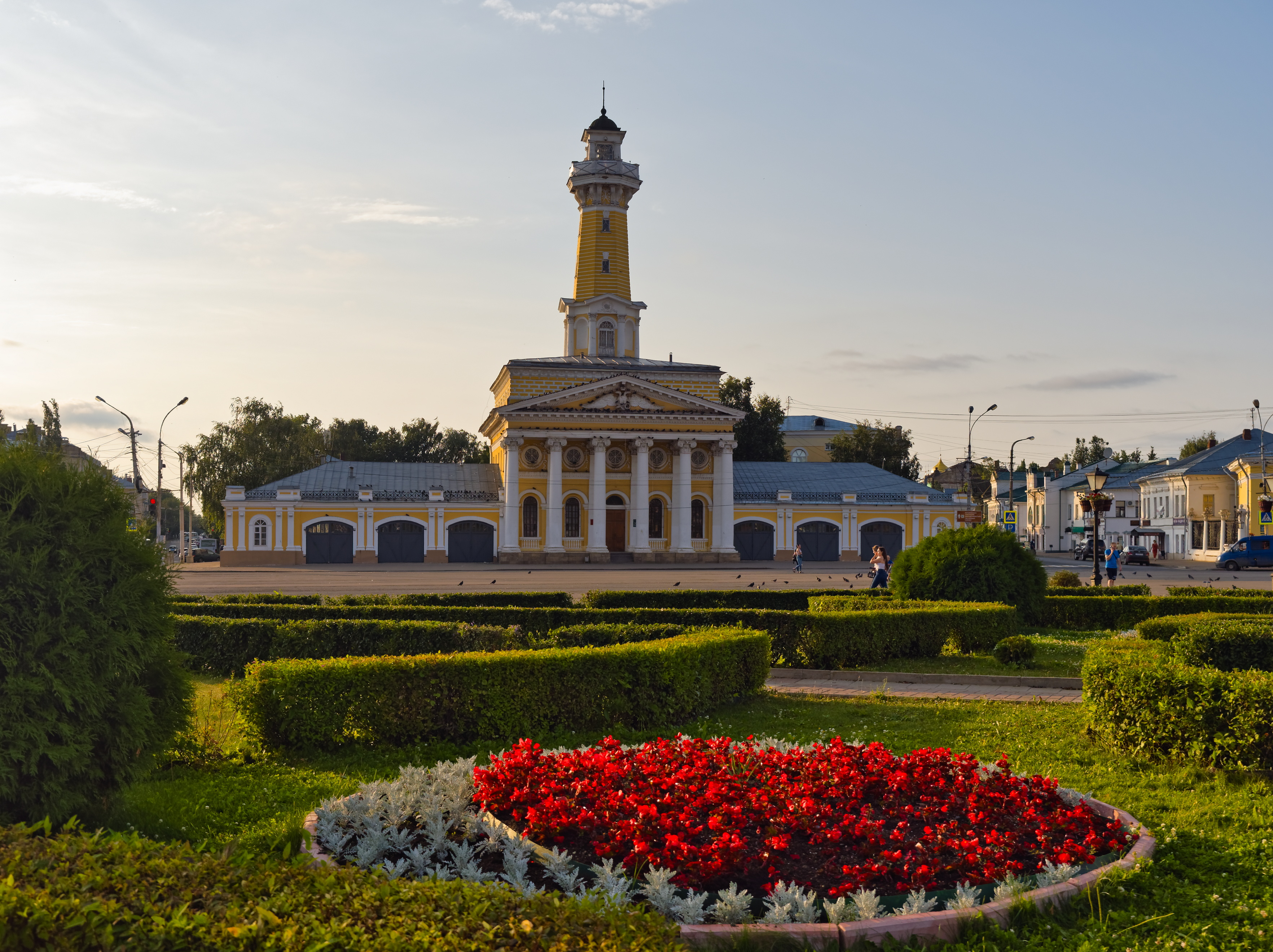
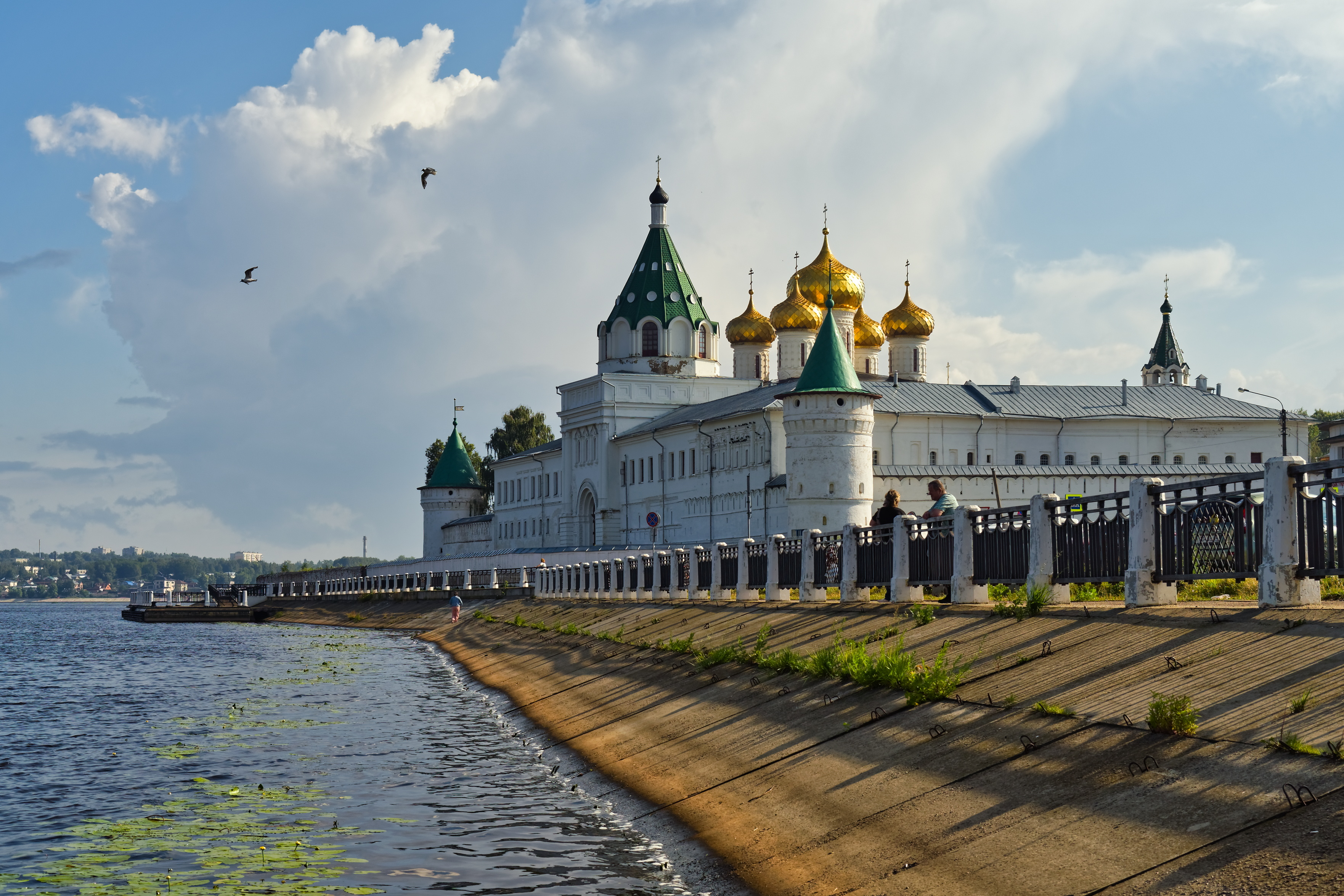
- Fire lookout tower, Kostroma Historic centre of Kostroma View of Kostroma Ipatiev Monastery

- Flag Coat of arms
- Interactive map of Kostroma
- Location of Kostroma Kostroma (Russia) Kostroma (European Russia) Kostroma (Europe)
- Coordinates: 57°46′05″N 40°55′37″E
- Country: Russia
- Federal subject: Kostroma Oblast
- Founded: 1152

Government
  - Head: Oleg Bolokhovets
- Elevation: 110 m (360 ft)

Population (2010 Census)
  - Total: 268,742
  - Estimate (2025): 264,952 (−1.4%)
  - Rank: 69th in 2010

Administrative status
  - Subordinated to: city of oblast significance of Kostroma
  - Capital of: Kostroma Oblast, Kostromskoy District

Municipal status
  - Urban okrug: Kostroma Urban Okrug
  - Capital of: Kostroma Urban Okrug, Kostromskoy Municipal District
- Time zone: UTC+3 (MSK)
- Postal code: 156XXX
- Dialing code: +7 4942
- OKTMO ID: 34701000001
- Website: grad.kostroma.gov.ru

Kostroma (Russian: Кострома́, IPA: [kəstrɐˈma]) is a historic city and the administrative center of Kostroma Oblast, Russia. A part of the Golden Ring of Russian cities, it is located at the confluence of the rivers Volga and Kostroma. In the 2021 census, the population is 267,481.

== History ==
=== Under the Rurikids ===
The official founding year of the city is 1152 by Yury Dolgoruky. Since many scholars believe that early Eastern Slavs tribes arrived in modern-day Belarus, Ukraine and western Russia AD 400 to 600, Kostroma could be much older than previously thought.

The city has the same name as the East Slavic goddess Kostroma.

Like other towns of the Eastern Rus, Kostroma was sacked by the Mongols in 1238. It then constituted a small principality, under leadership of Prince Vasily of Kostroma, a younger brother of the famous Alexander Nevsky. Upon inheriting the grand ducal title in 1271, Vasily didn't leave the town for Vladimir, and his descendants ruled Kostroma for another half a century, until the town was bought by Ivan I of Moscow.

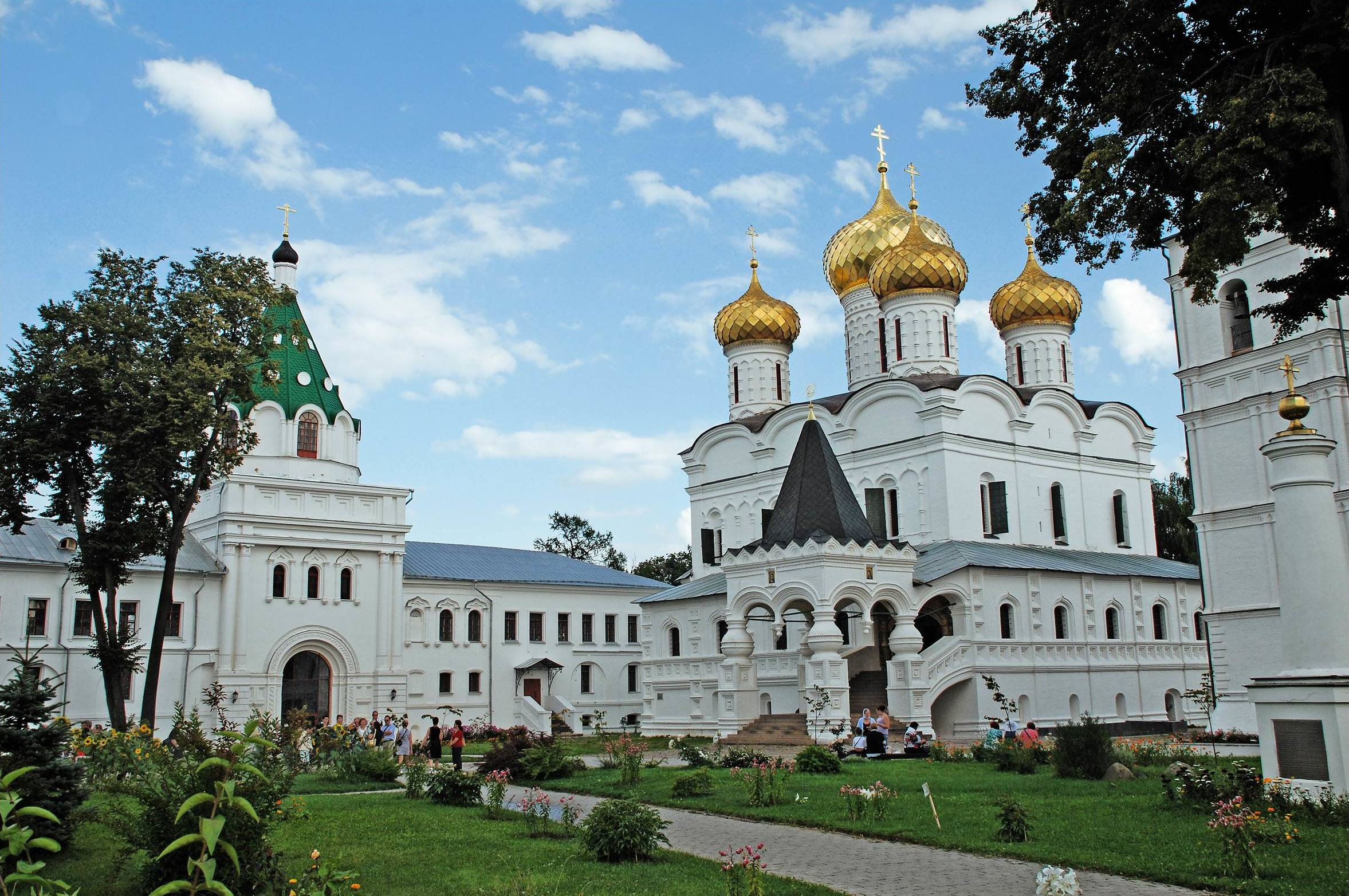
Ipatievsky Monastery, 2009

As one of the northernmost towns of the Grand Duchy of Moscow, Kostroma served for grand dukes as a place of retreat when enemies besieged Moscow in 1382, 1408, and 1433. In 1375, the town was looted by Novgorod pirates (ushkuiniks). The spectacular growth of the city in the 16th century may be attributed to the establishment of trade connections with English and Dutch merchants (Muscovy Company) through the northern port of Archangel. Boris Godunov had the Ipatiev and Epiphany monasteries rebuilt in stone. The construction works were finished just in time for the city to witness some of the most dramatic events of the Time of Troubles.

The heroic peasant Ivan Susanin became a symbol of the city's resistance to foreign invaders; several monuments to him may be seen in Kostroma. The future Tsar, Mikhail Romanov, also lived at the monastery. It was here that an embassy from Moscow offered him the Russian crown in 1612.

=== Under the Romanovs ===
A wooden house of Mikhail Romanov is still preserved in the monastery. There are also several old wooden structures transported to the monastery walls from distant districts of the Kostroma Oblast.

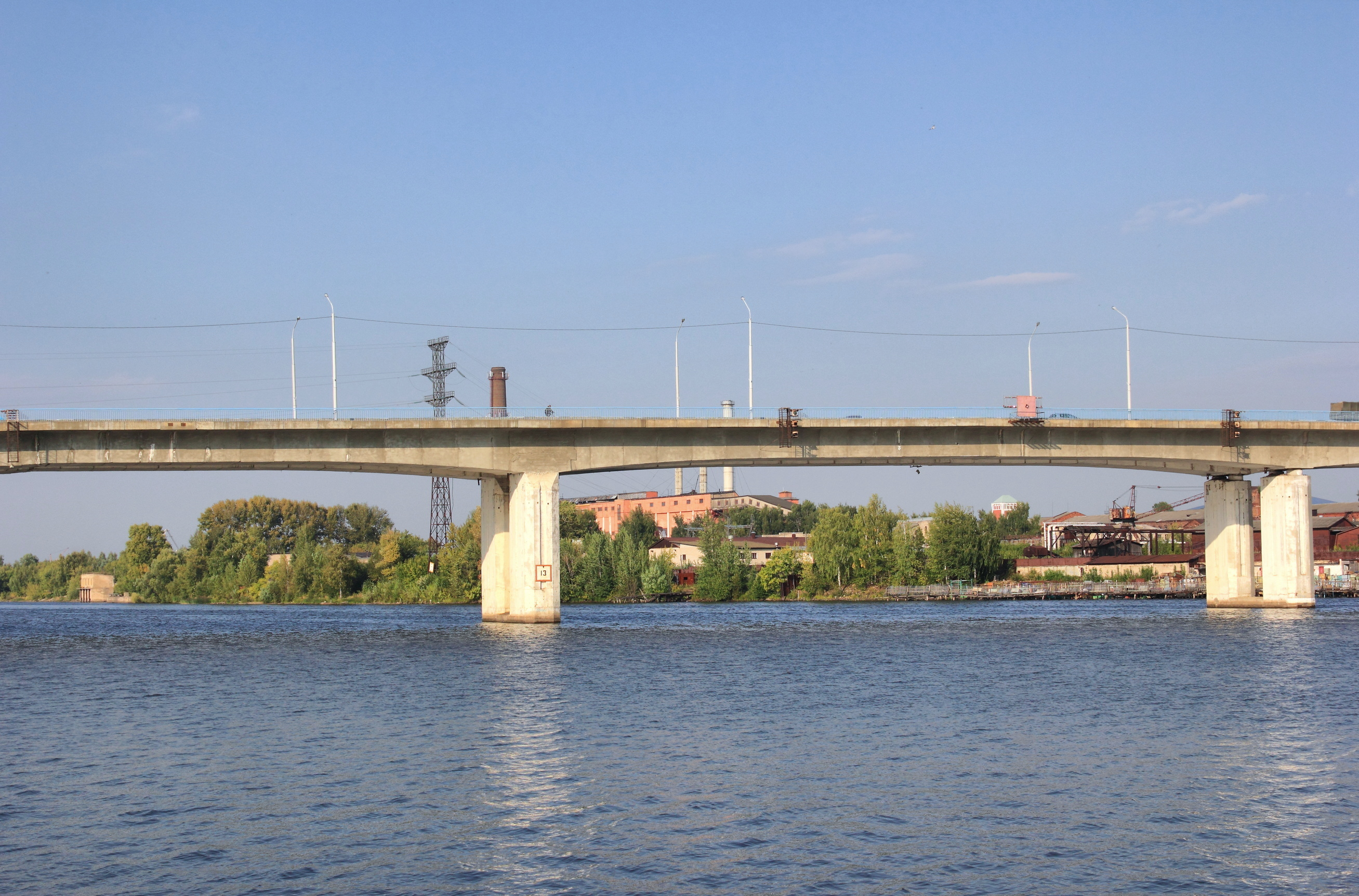
Kostroma River, 2011

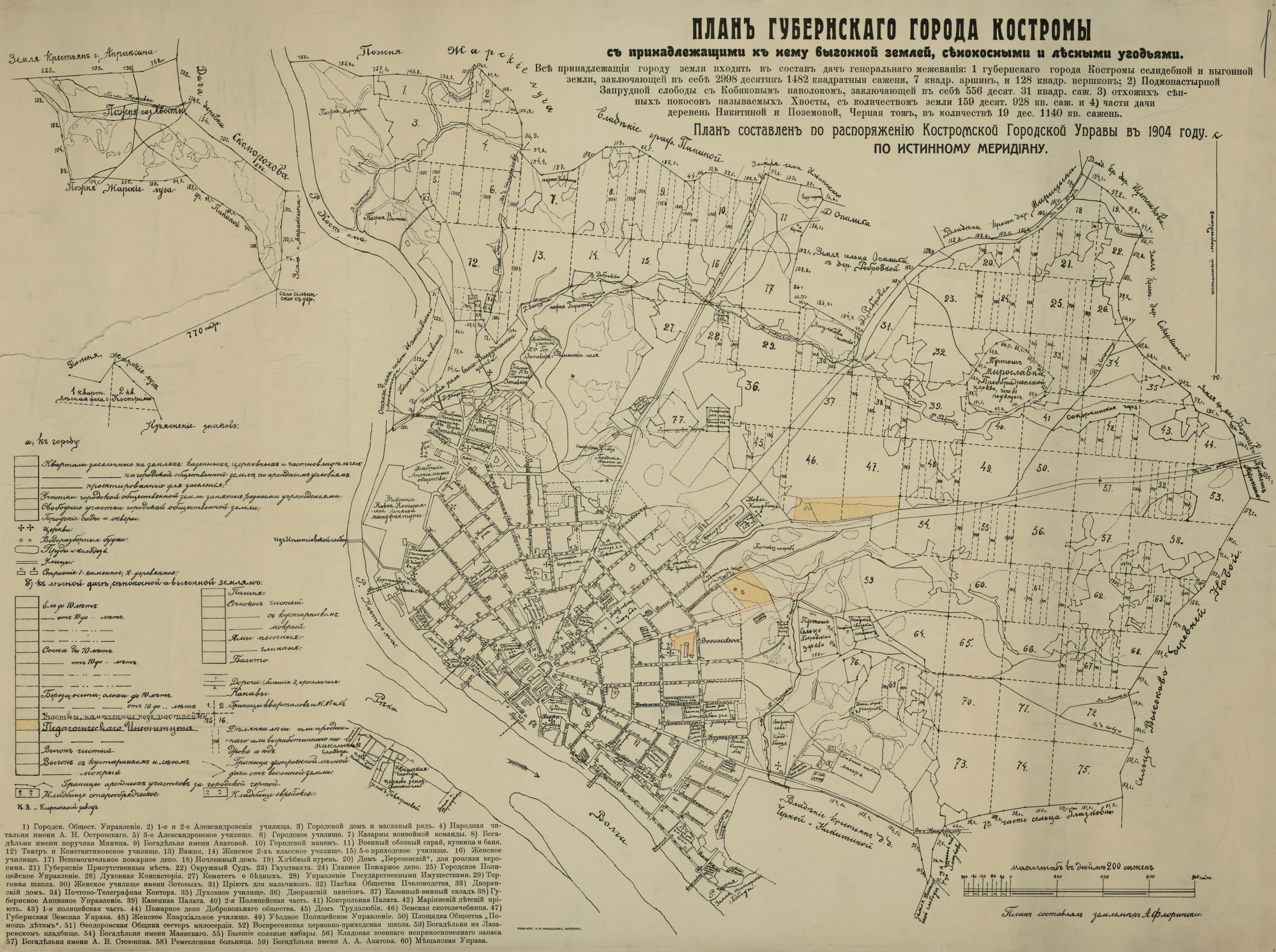
Plan of Kostroma, 1907

In 1773, Kostroma was devastated by a great fire. Afterwards the city was rebuilt with streets radiating from a single focal point near the river. They say that Catherine the Great dropped her fan on the city map, and told the architects to follow her design. One of the best preserved examples of the 18th century town planning, Kostroma retains some elegant structures in a "provincial neoclassical" style. These include a governor's palace, a fire tower, a rotunda on the Volga embankment, and an arcaded central market with a merchant church in the center.

=== During and after the Russian Revolution ===
The First Workers' Socialist Club based in Kostroma was one of the best documented workers' clubs run by Proletkult. Organised around the principle of a "public hearth" (obshchestvennyi ochag) this club combined both practical support for workers in need of accommodation, food or furniture, as well as providing a focus for popular education.

=== Nuclear power referendum ===
The Nuclear Power Referendum was arranged in 1990 in the Kostroma area. 90% of the voting population were against nuclear power in the area. A Kostroma Nuclear Power Plant has been proposed.

== Administrative and municipal status ==
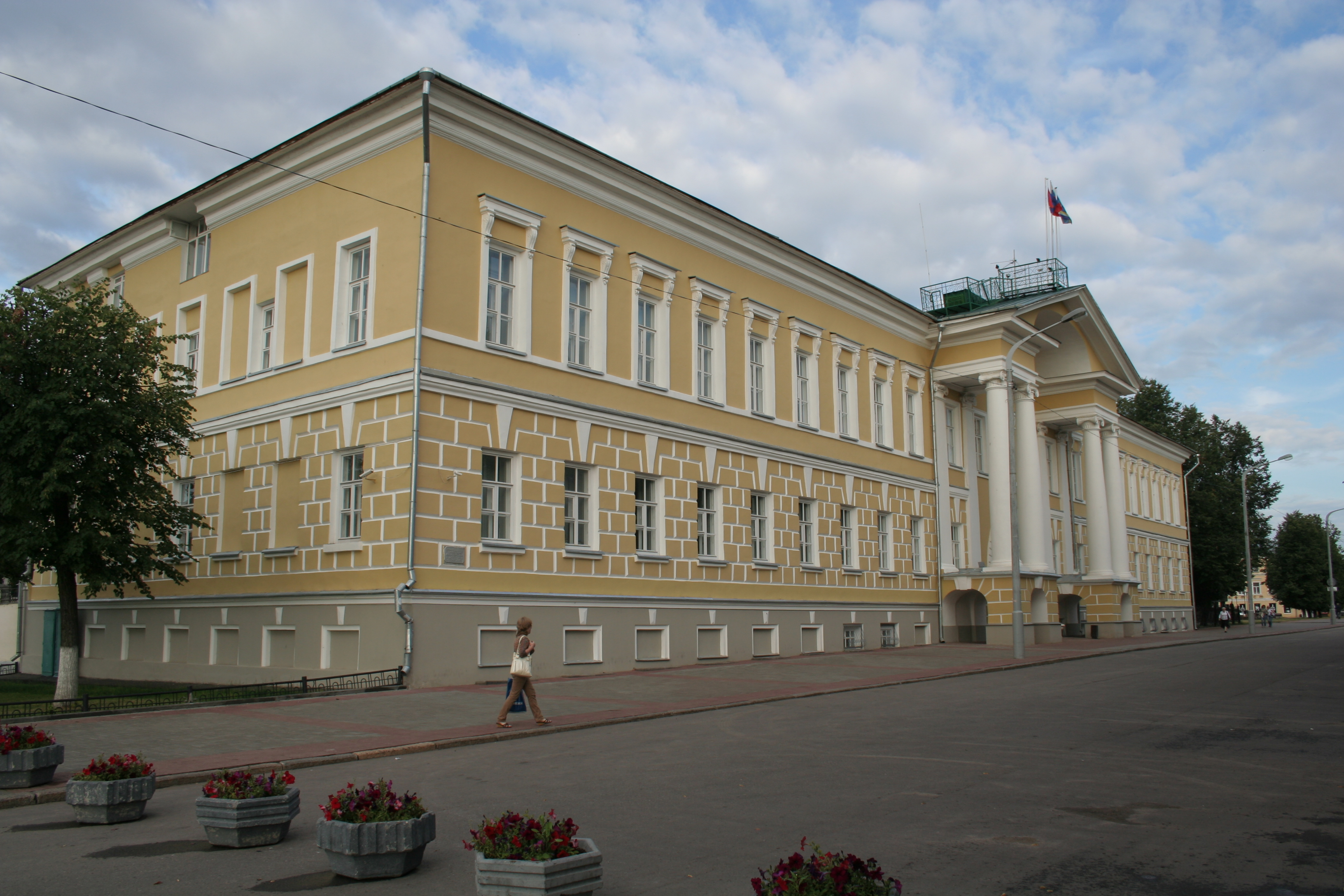
City Hall, July 2009

Kostroma is the administrative center of the oblast and, within the framework of administrative divisions, it also serves as the administrative center of Kostromskoy District, even though it is not a part of it. As an administrative division, it is incorporated separately as the city of oblast significance of Kostroma—an administrative unit with a status equal to that of the districts. As a municipal division, the city of oblast significance of Kostroma is incorporated as Kostroma Urban Okrug.

== Geography ==
The city is located at the confluence of the rivers Volga and Kostroma.

=== Climate ===
Kostroma has a continental climate (Köppen Dfb). It has long, very cold winters and short warm summers.

Climate data for Kostroma (1991–2020, extremes 1842–present)
Month	Jan	Feb	Mar	Apr	May	Jun	Jul	Aug	Sep	Oct	Nov	Dec	Year
Record high °C (°F)	6.6 (43.9)	7.2 (45.0)	17.9 (64.2)	27.6 (81.7)	32.5 (90.5)	34.5 (94.1)	37.1 (98.8)	37.3 (99.1)	30.2 (86.4)	22.9 (73.2)	13.8 (56.8)	9.4 (48.9)	37.3 (99.1)
Mean daily maximum °C (°F)	−5.9 (21.4)	−4.8 (23.4)	1.0 (33.8)	10.2 (50.4)	18.2 (64.8)	21.7 (71.1)	24.2 (75.6)	21.7 (71.1)	15.6 (60.1)	7.7 (45.9)	0.0 (32.0)	−4.0 (24.8)	8.8 (47.9)
Daily mean °C (°F)	−8.8 (16.2)	−8.2 (17.2)	−2.8 (27.0)	5.0 (41.0)	12.3 (54.1)	16.1 (61.0)	18.6 (65.5)	16.3 (61.3)	10.9 (51.6)	4.4 (39.9)	−2.3 (27.9)	−6.6 (20.1)	4.6 (40.2)
Mean daily minimum °C (°F)	−11.8 (10.8)	−11.3 (11.7)	−6.3 (20.7)	0.8 (33.4)	7.1 (44.8)	11.1 (52.0)	13.7 (56.7)	11.7 (53.1)	7.2 (45.0)	1.8 (35.2)	−4.4 (24.1)	−9.1 (15.6)	0.9 (33.6)
Record low °C (°F)	−46.4 (−51.5)	−39.3 (−38.7)	−31.1 (−24.0)	−19.0 (−2.2)	−5.5 (22.1)	−2.7 (27.1)	3.2 (37.8)	1.3 (34.3)	−5.8 (21.6)	−21.1 (−6.0)	−28.8 (−19.8)	−44.4 (−47.9)	−46.4 (−51.5)
Average precipitation mm (inches)	41 (1.6)	29 (1.1)	31 (1.2)	35 (1.4)	53 (2.1)	74 (2.9)	73 (2.9)	73 (2.9)	56 (2.2)	64 (2.5)	49 (1.9)	40 (1.6)	618 (24.3)
Average extreme snow depth cm (inches)	35 (14)	44 (17)	43 (17)	10 (3.9)	0 (0)	0 (0)	0 (0)	0 (0)	0 (0)	1 (0.4)	5 (2.0)	18 (7.1)	44 (17)
Average rainy days	6	5	8	14	16	17	16	17	18	18	11	8	154
Average snowy days	28	24	18	8	1	0.1	0	0	1	7	20	27	134
Average relative humidity (%)	87	83	77	68	64	72	74	78	82	86	88	88	79
Mean monthly sunshine hours	35.1	68.7	136.9	193.0	257.1	278.6	284.3	232.4	136.5	67.6	29.7	22.2	1,742.1
Source 1: Pogoda.ru.net
Source 2: NOAA

Historical population
Year	Pop.	±%
1897	41,336	—
1926	72,317	+74.9%
1939	121,325	+67.8%
1959	171,720	+41.5%
1970	223,042	+29.9%
1979	254,725	+14.2%
1989	278,414	+9.3%
2002	278,750	+0.1%
2010	268,742	−3.6%
2021	267,481	−0.5%
Source: Census data

== Sights and landmarks ==
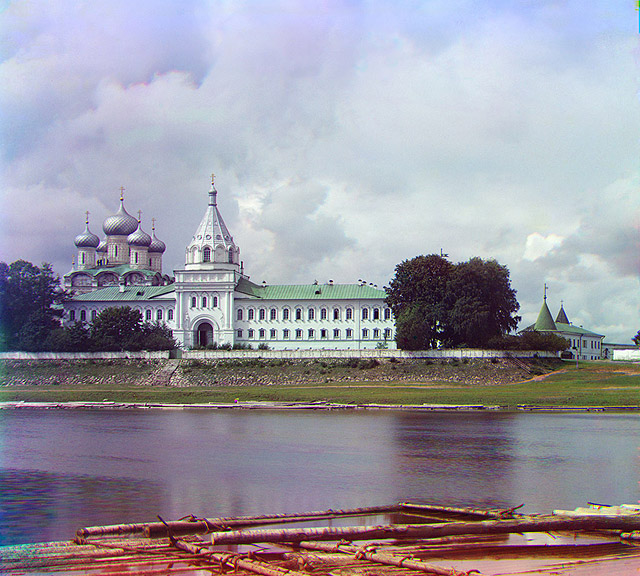
Ipatiev Monastery gives its name to the Hypatian Codex of the Russian Primary Chronicle. Photo by Sergey Prokudin-Gorsky, 1911

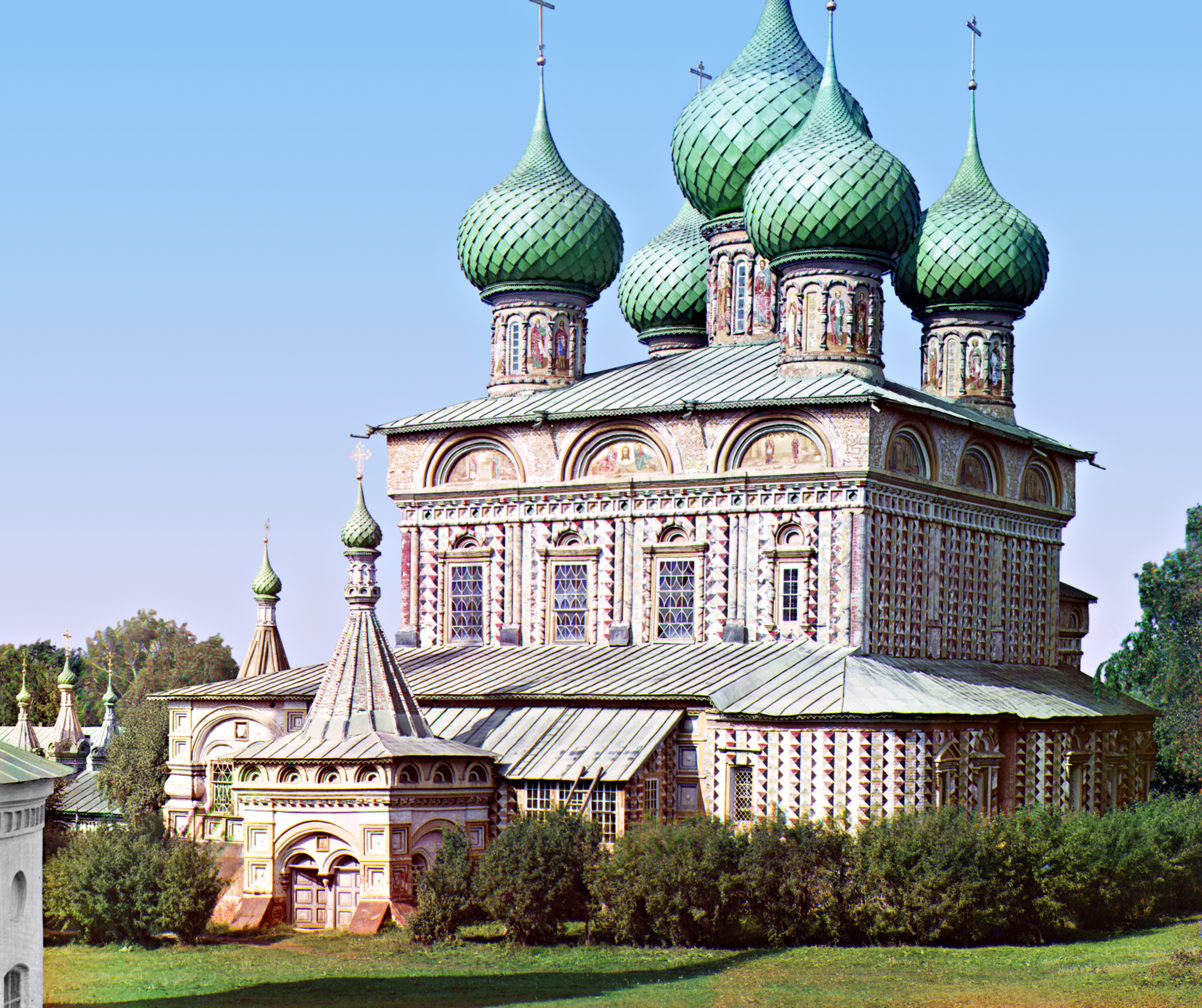
The Resurrection Church (1652) is an example of 17th-century Russian art. Color photograph by Sergey Prokudin-Gorsky in 1910 (Library of Congress)

Built in 1559–1565, the five-domed Epiphany Cathedral was the first stone edifice in the city; its medieval frescoes perished during a fire several years ago. The minster houses the city's most precious relic, a 10th-century Byzantine icon called Our Lady of St. Theodore. It was with this icon that Mikhail Romanov was blessed by his mother when he left for Moscow to claim the Russian throne. They say that just before the Revolution of 1917, the icon blackened so badly that the image was hardly visible; it was interpreted as a bad sign for the Romanov dynasty.

The Ipatyevsky monastery survives mostly intact, with its 16th-century walls, towers, belfry, and the 17th-century cathedral.

Apart from the monasteries, most of the city churches were either rebuilt or demolished during the Soviet years. The only city church that survives from the 17th-century "golden age" is the Resurrection church on the Lowlands (Russian: церковь Воскресения на Дебре). As the story goes, the church was commissioned by one merchant who ordered in England ten barrels of dye but received ten barrels of gold instead. He resolved that the unearned gold was the devil's gift and decided to spend it on building a church. Two other 17th-century temples, of rather conventional architecture, may be seen on the opposite side of the Volga.

Among the vestiges of the Godunov rule, a fine tent-like church in the urban-type settlement of Krasnoye-na-Volge (formerly an estate of Boris Godunov's brother) may be recommended.

== Transportation ==
The city is served by the Kostroma Airport. Since 1887 there has been a railway connection between Kostroma and Moscow.

== Notable people ==
- Olesya Barel (born 1960), basketball player
- Nina Demme (1902–1977), polar explorer and biologist
- Anatoly Dokumentov (born 1937), pianist and composer.
- Aleksandra Ishimova (1805–1881), translator and author of children's books
- Roman Kopin (born 1974), Governor of Chukotka Autonomous Okrug
- Aleksey Pisemsky (1821–1881), novelist and dramatist
- Porphyrius Uspensky (1804–1885), Russian Orthodox theologian, orientalist, archaeologist and byzantinologist
- The Lubavitcher Rebbe, Rabbi Yosef Yitzchak Shneersohn was exiled to Kostroma by the USSR in 1927 for 3 years, and was released after 9 days

== Twin towns – sister cities ==
Kostroma is twinned with:

- Aachen, Germany
- Babruysk, Belarus
- Bari, Italy
- Bat Yam, Israel
- Berane, Montenegro
- Cetinje, Montenegro
- (Moldova) Ceadîr-Lunga, Moldavia
- Danilov, Russia
- Dole, France
- Hyvinkää, Finland
- Ijevan, Armenia
- (Georgia (country)) Ochamchire, Georgia
- Oral, Kazakhstan
- Piotrków Trybunalski, Poland
- Samokov, Bulgaria
- Sanmenxia, China
- (Moldova) Soroca, Moldavia
- Vrbas, Serbia

Following the 2022 Russian invasion of Ukraine, Both Durham, England’s and Durham, North Carolina’s councils revoked the twinning arrangements with Kostroma, which had been in place since 1968.
