= Church of the Ascension =

Church of the Ascension is any church dedicated to the ascension of Jesus:

== Canada ==
- Church of the Ascension (Ottawa)
- Church of the Ascension (Windsor, Ontario)

== England ==
- The Ascension, Lavender Hill
- Church of the Ascension, Hall Green
- Church of the Ascension, Malvern Link
- Church of the Ascension, Lower Broughton
- Church of the Ascension, Whixley

== Israel ==
- Chapel of the Ascension (Jerusalem), at the site of the oldest Byzantine Church of the Ascension; now part of mosque
- Russian Orthodox Church of the Ascension, Mount of Olives, Jerusalem; main church of the convent of the same name at At-Tur
- Augusta Victoria Hospital, Jerusalem, which includes the German Protestant Ascension Church

== Latvia ==
- Ascension Church, Riga

== Russia ==
- Church of the Ascension (Bataysk)
- Church of the Ascension (Chaltyr)
- Greater Church of the Ascension on Bolshaya Nikitskaya Street, Moscow
- Lesser Ascension Church on Bolshaya Nikitskaya Street
- Ascension Church, Yaroslavl
- The Church of Ascension built circa 1530 CE by the Grand Prince of Moscow
- Church of the Ascension, Susat, Semikarakorsky District, Rostov Oblast, Russia
- Ascension Church (Kolomenskoye)

== Serbia ==
- Church of the Ascension, Belgrade

== United States ==
By state

- Church of the Holy Ascension, Unalaska, Alaska
- Church of the Ascension (Saratoga, California), in the Roman Catholic Diocese of San Jose in California
- Episcopal Church of the Ascension (Sierra Madre, California)
- Church of the Ascension (Denver, Colorado), a Denver Landmark
- Church of the Ascension (Hamden, Connecticut)
- Church of the Ascension (Washington, D.C.)
- Church of the Ascension and Saint Agnes, Washington, D.C.
- Church of the Ascension (Clearwater, Florida)
- Church of the Ascension (Frankfort, Kentucky)
- Church of the Ascension (Mt. Sterling, Kentucky)
- Church of the Ascension, Chicago, Illinois
- Church of the Ascension (Fall River, Massachusetts)
- Holy Ascension Orthodox Church, Albion, Michigan
- Church of the Ascension (Atlantic City, New Jersey)
- Church of the Ascension, Episcopal (Manhattan), New York
- Church of the Ascension, Roman Catholic (Manhattan), New York
- Church of the Ascension (Saranac Inn, New York)
- Episcopal Church of the Ascension and Manse, Wellsville, Ohio
- Church of the Ascension (Pittsburgh), Pennsylvania
- Ascension of Our Lord Catholic Church, Moravia, Texas
- Church of the Ascension (Centreville, Virginia)

== See also ==
- Episcopal Church of the Ascension (disambiguation)
- Ascension Convent in the Moscow Kremlin
