= Episcopal Church of the Ascension =

Episcopal Church of the Ascension, or variants thereof, may refer to:

== United States ==
=== California ===
- Episcopal Church of the Ascension (Sierra Madre, California)

=== Delaware ===
- Church of the Ascension (Claymont, Delaware), part of the New Castle Parish of the Episcopal Diocese of Delaware

=== Florida ===
- Church of the Ascension (Clearwater, Florida), part of the Episcopal Diocese of Southwest Florida

=== Illinois ===
- Church of the Ascension, Chicago, a parish in the Episcopal Diocese of Chicago

=== Kentucky ===
- Church of the Ascension (Frankfort, Kentucky), part of the Episcopal Diocese of Lexington, Kentucky

=== New York ===
- Church of the Ascension (New York) in Greenwich Village, New York City, part of the Episcopal Diocese of New York

=== Pennsylvania ===
- Church of the Ascension (Pittsburgh) in Pittsburgh, Pennsylvania, part of the Episcopal Diocese of Pittsburgh

=== Tennessee ===
- Episcopal Church of the Ascension (Tennessee) in Bearden, Knoxville, part of the Episcopal Diocese of East Tennessee

=== Washington, D.C. ===
- Church of the Ascension and St Agnes (Washington D.C.), part of the Episcopal Diocese of Washington.

== See also ==
- Church of the Ascension (disambiguation)
