= Susat (rural locality) =

Rural locality in Semikarakorsky District, Rostov Oblast, Russia

Coordinates: 47.4252°N 40.7098°E

Susat (Russian: Сусат) is a village in Semikarakorsky District, Rostov Oblast, Russia.

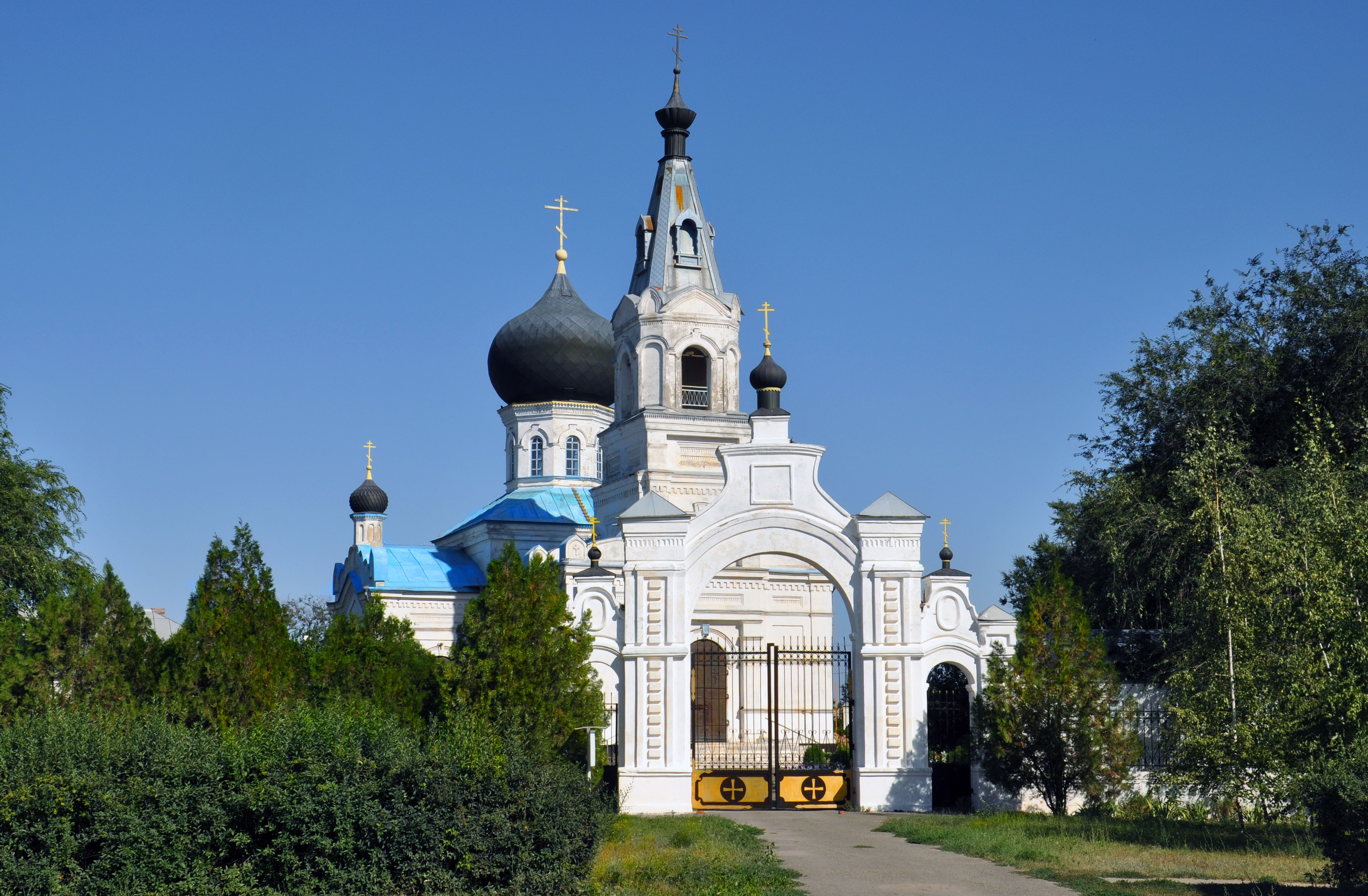
Church of the Ascension
