= Ascension Church, Yaroslavl =

Coordinates: 57°37′34″N 39°52′14″E

The Church of the Ascension of Christ (Вознесенская церковь) is a four-piered penticupolar Orthodox church erected in Kondakovo, a western suburb of Yaroslavl between 1677 and 1682.

The church is located in Yaroslavl, Svobody Street 44.

The first church on the site was commissioned in 1584 by Basil Kondaki, a wealthy Greek merchant, in order to prevent the planned construction of a Lutheran church in Kondakovo. A smaller parish church is dedicated to the Presentation of Jesus at the Temple. This late Baroque building incorporates the 17th-century refectory, a survival from an earlier church. A belfry dating from 1745 was demolished in the 20th century.

The parish churches sustained damage in the Yaroslavl Uprising of 1918 and were later adapted for use by a nearby car barn. The larger church, with all the domes taken down, was used as a depot. Aleksey Soplyakov's frescoes from 1736 have all but disappeared. It was not until the late 2000s that the buildings were returned to the Russian Orthodox Church and restoration work began.

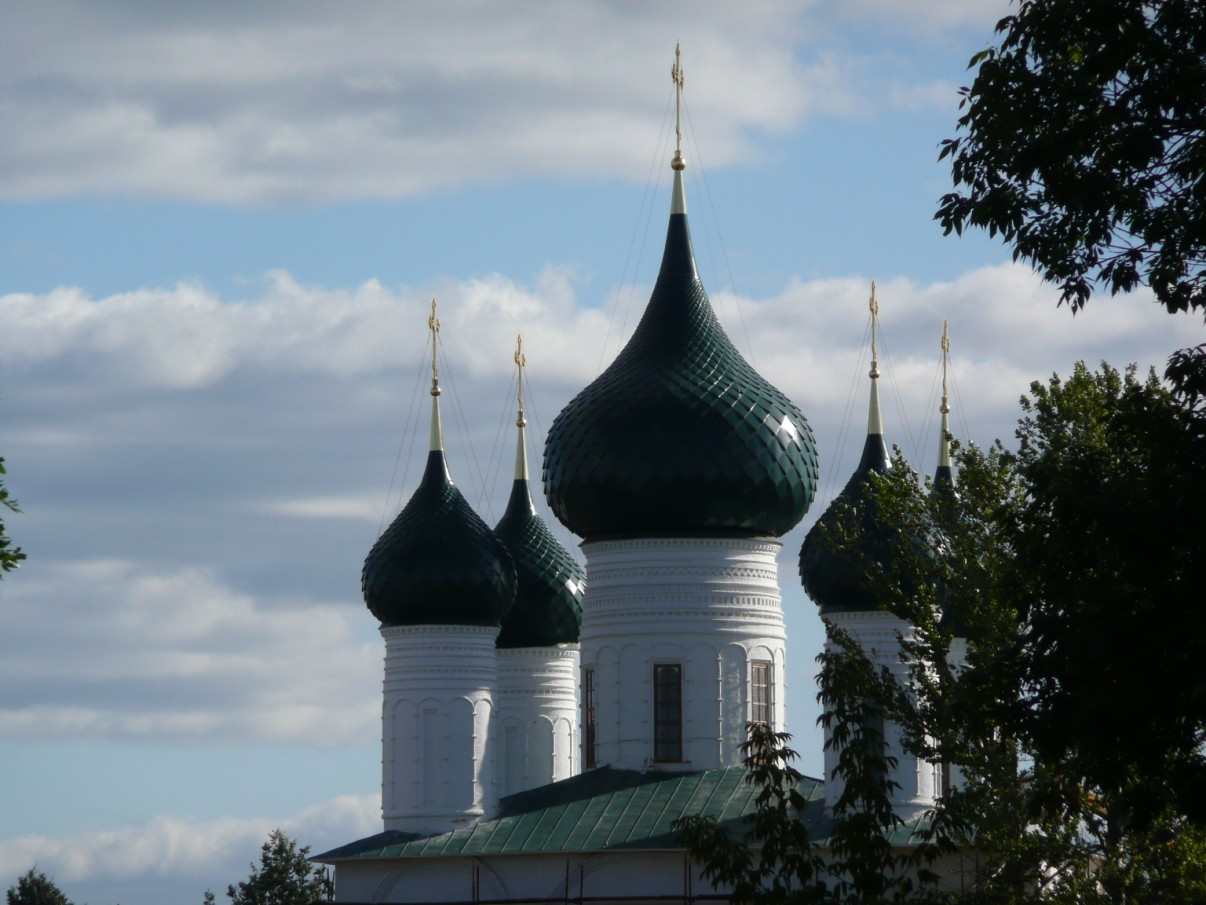
The onion domes of Ascension Church

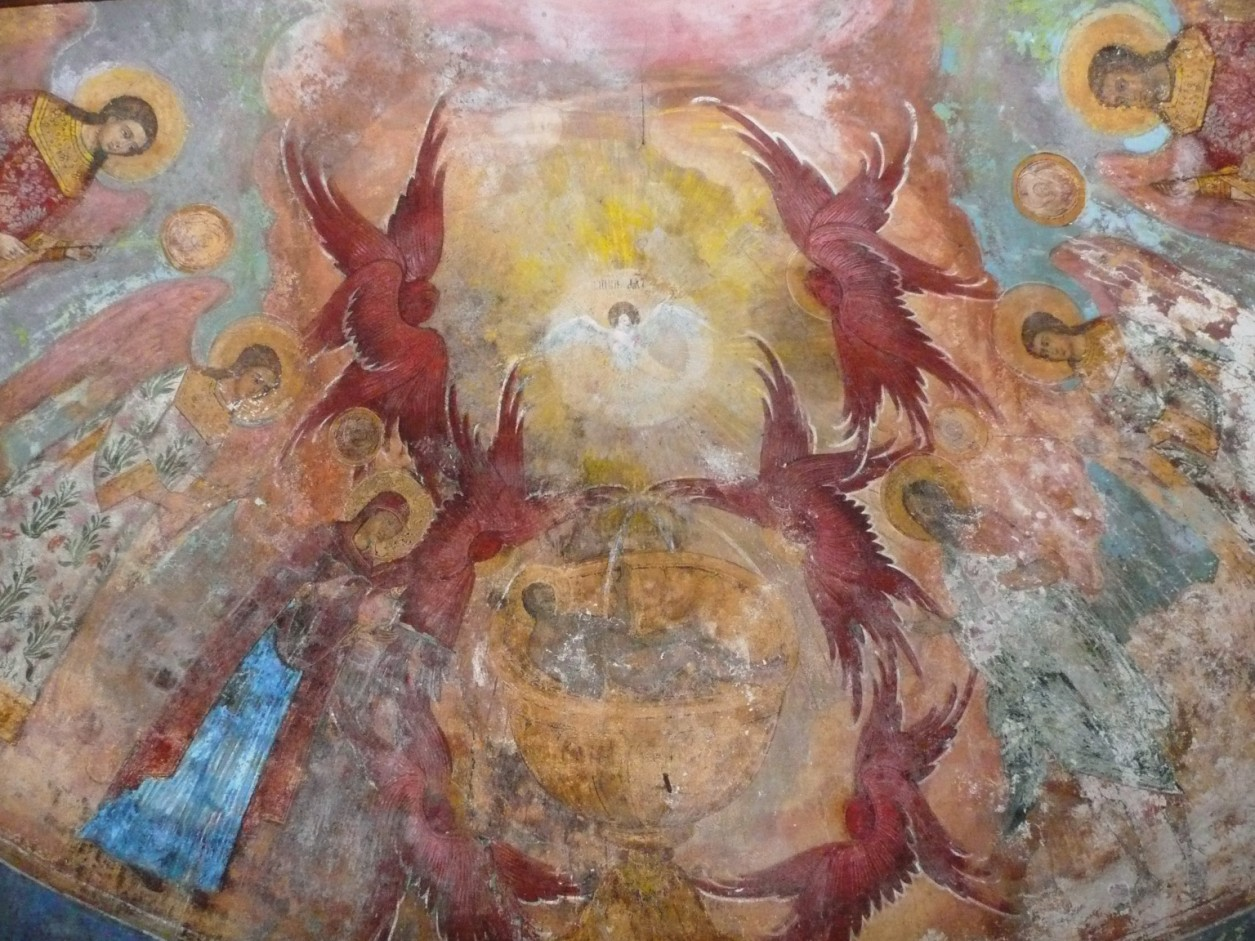
A fresco in the prothesis

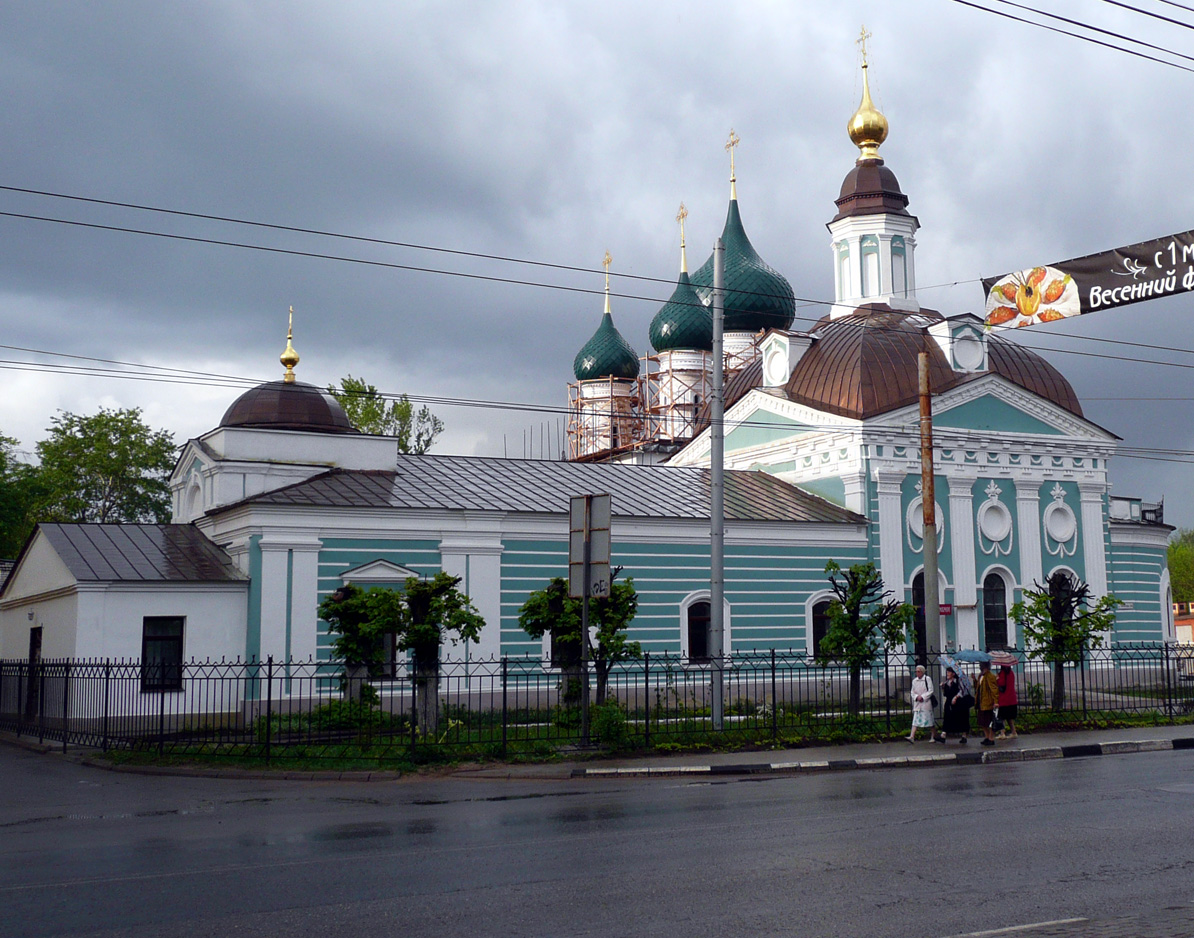
Presentation Church
