= Church of the Ascension, Susat =

Church in Russia

The Church of the Ascension
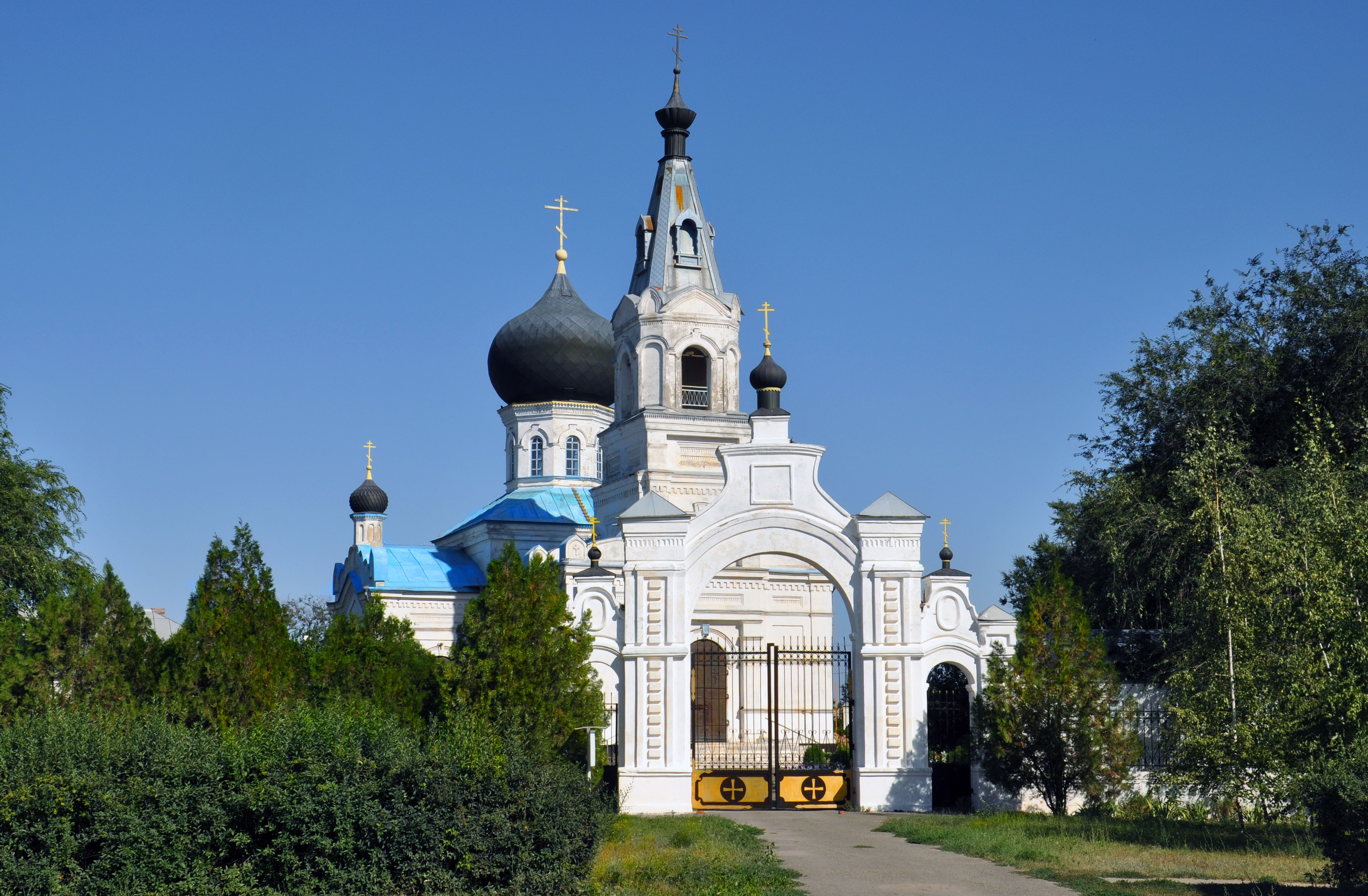

- Location within Russia

Religion
- Affiliation: Russian Orthodox

Location
- Location: Susat village, Semikarakorsky District, Rostov Oblast, Russia
- Interactive map of The Church of the Ascension
- Coordinates: 47.2540°N 40.4209°E

Architecture
- Style: Russian Revival architecture
- Completed: 1914

The Church of the Ascension of the Lord (Russian: Церковь Вознесения Господня) ― is a Russian Orthodox church in Susat village, Semikarakorsky District, Rostov Oblast, Russia. It belongs to Semikarakorsky Deanery of Volgodonsk and Salsk Diocese of Moscow Patriarchate. It was built in 1914 in Russian Revival architecture style.

== History ==
It is known that before the Church of the Ascension was built, there had already been two churches in the settlement: the wooden Church of the Ascension of the Lord, which was completed in 1863, and the second one that was erected in 1891 at its place. When eventually it also became decayed, it was decided to erect a new church, this time a stone one. The Church of the Ascension in the village of Susat was founded in 1906, and construction works continued until 1914.

Two chapels of the church were consecrated in honor of the Kazan Icon of the Mother of God and Feast of the Cross.

In 1929 the church was closed, and its premises were used for a local recreation centre, and then for the granary and warehouse of the shopping center.

In 1989 the church was handed over to the Russian Orthodox Church, and in the following year the liturgy was held there again. Soon after the building was repaired and interior decoration were also restored.

== Exterior ==
The church was built in Neo-Russian style. The building is cross-shaped in plan, it is adjoined by a three-tiered bell tower. On the roff there are small stained-glass windows. In front of the church building there is a memorial dedicated to the villagers who were killed during Great Patriotic War.
