= Church of the Ascension (Windsor, Ontario) =

Coordinates: 42.3126°N 83.05516°W

Church of the Ascension, Windsor, Ontario
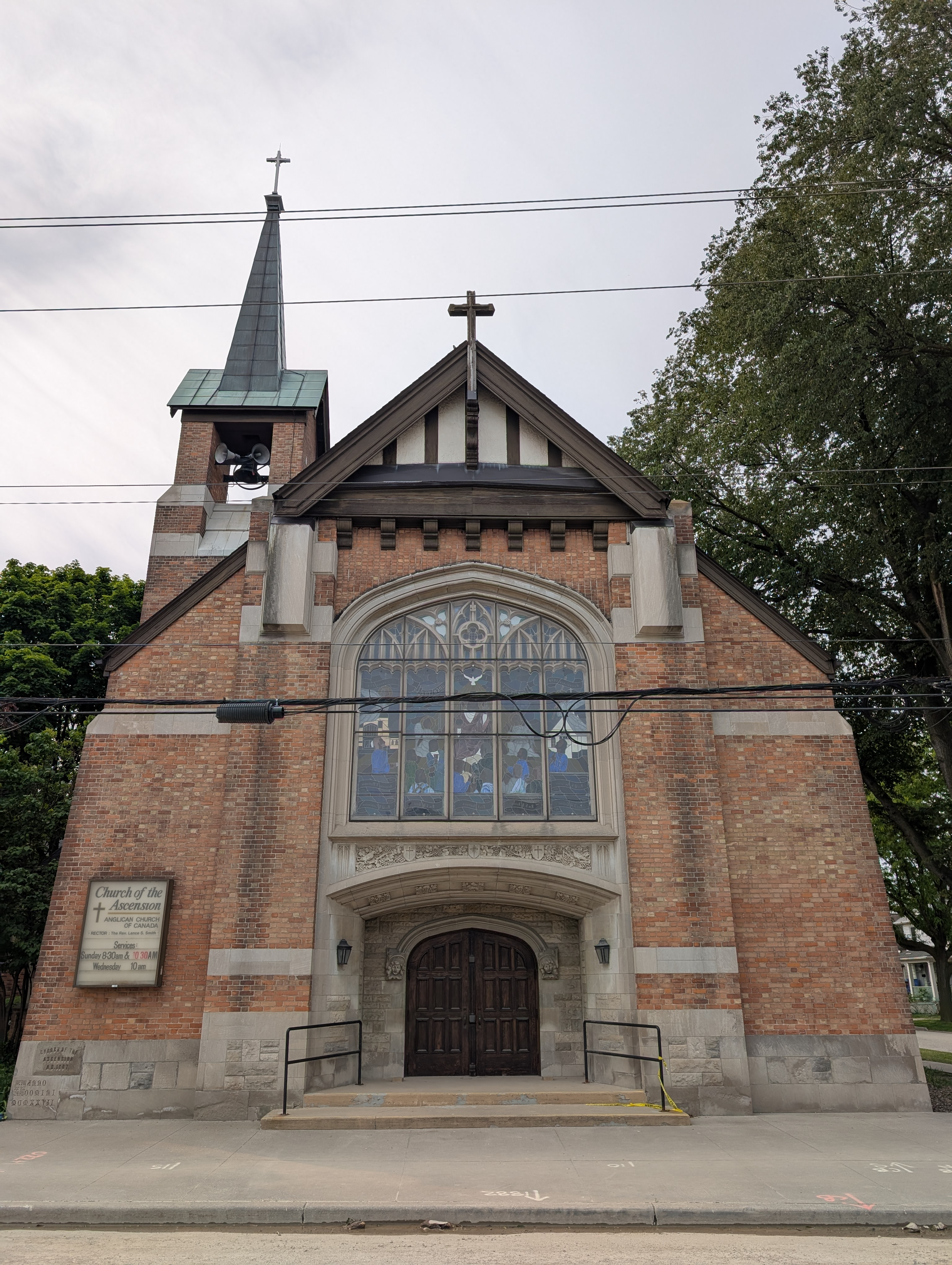
- Church of the Ascension, Windsor, Ontario
- Location: 1385 University Avenue West; Windsor, Ontario; N9B 1B6
- Denomination: Anglican Church of Canada
- Website: http://www.ascensionwindsor.ca/

History
- Dedication: Ascension

Administration
- Province: Canada
- Diocese: Ontario Diocese of Huron
- Parish: Ontario

Church of the Ascension is located in Windsor, Ontario, Canada. It is part of the Diocese of Huron and is a member of the Anglican Church of Canada. The Chapel of Ascension, as it was formerly called was founded on May 11, 1893 and the current church is still holding their services at the original location on London Street, now called University Avenue. Early in its existence the parish was served by the rectors and curates of their sister church, All Saints Anglican Church, Windsor. Prior to the construction of the original frame church people would gather at the site and hold services. Church of the Ascension grew until it was a large enough congregation and as a result they received their first official rector in 1905.

== Early history ==
The church has been rebuilt and refurbished throughout its history. As the church grew the original frame structure became too small and as a result it was demolished and construction of a larger brick building started in August 1907 when the cornerstone of the new building was placed. The new church building was dedicated on May 31, 1908. This structure was destroyed by fire of unknown causes on December 22, 1926. The only items that were saved from the fire were the altar linens, communion vessels and the parish hall. Services were held in the parish hall while the church was being rebuilt. The new cornerstone was laid in 1927 and the re-building of the church commenced. The church was re-dedicated on December 4, 1927, after construction was completed.

The church building and property have seen many changes and additions through the years, funds for which were mainly donated by its parishioners. Improvements have included new stained glass windows, a new organ, and a rectory, the renovation of the parish hall, a parking lot, air conditioning, and a new office built in 1988.

== 1990 arson ==
A second fire occurred on January 14, 1990. The cause of this fire was arson. Much of the church was destroyed, but restoration work began immediately. While the restoration was taking place services were held at a local school, and eventually in the parish hall which survived the fire with minor damage. Members of the church were able to save several items from destruction including the cross, altar cloths, silver, candlesticks, church records, the church Bible and many of the pews. The stained glass windows in the church were rebuilt using the original glass and new lead as the original lead of the windows had buckled from the heat of the fire. The church was rededicated in November 1990 with many local dignitaries in attendance.

== The church today ==
The church has continued to add additions to its building and grounds including a Memorial Garden, which has utilized some of the charred beams from the church, a new church sign, paintings in the parish hall and nursery and a new stained glass window, installed in 1993, which faces the street and celebrates the church's centennial.
