= Church of the Ascension (Centreville, Virginia) =

Church in Centreville, Virginia, US

Coordinates: 38.841039°N 77.429980°W

The Church of the Ascension is an Anglican Catholic church in Centreville, Virginia. The church building is also known locally as "The Old Stone Church", and was built around 1854.

Mathew Brady image, 1862

== History ==
The Church of the Ascension, like many churches in the continuing Anglican movement, began with a group of people who were dissatisfied with the direction of the Episcopal Church. However, unlike most groups, those who formed Ascension acted sooner and did not wait for the watershed moment of the mid 1970s.

The first service for the Church of the Ascension was held on June 23, 1968, at Robert E. Lee High School in Fairfax County, Virginia. In its early years the parish met in other school settings. On December 23, 1973 (Advent 4), the parish moved into its current building, known as the "Old Stone Church", in Centreville, Virginia.

The parish was initially a member of the Anglican Orthodox Church. During the early years the parish was served by a numerous supply priests until it could find its first rector.

The parish was involved in the continuing Anglican movement, as members were present at the meeting of the "Fellowship of Concerned Churchmen" at St. Louis in 1977 (from which the Affirmation of St. Louis developed).

The Church of the Ascension is one of the founding parishes of both the Anglican Catholic Church and the Diocese of the Mid-Atlantic States.

== Rectors of the Church of the Ascension ==
- The Rev. Troy Arnold Kaichen (born 1927; April 15, 1970 - July 15, 1971)
- The Rev. Thomas James Kleppinger (born 1944; August 1, 1971 - March 1, 1973)
- The Rev. Thomas James Kleppinger (born 1944; April 4, 1973 - November 30, 1974)
- The Rev. Ramsey Robertson-Kendall (June 1975 - September 1984)
- The Rev. David Rupp (deceased 2016; October 1984 - November 29, 2000)
- The Rev. Phillip Barber (deceased 2017; April 15, 2001 - September 20, 2009)
- The Rev. Michael C. Weaver (born 1970; October 23, 2010 – present)
