= Ascension Church, Riga =

Church in Latvia

Ascension Church
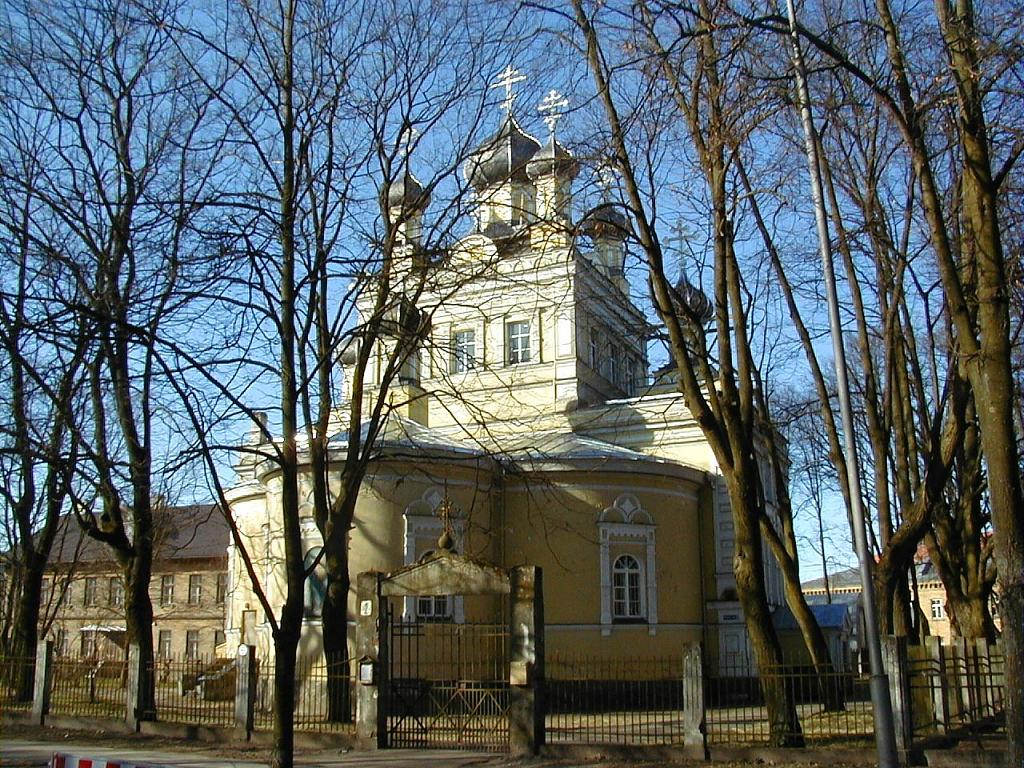

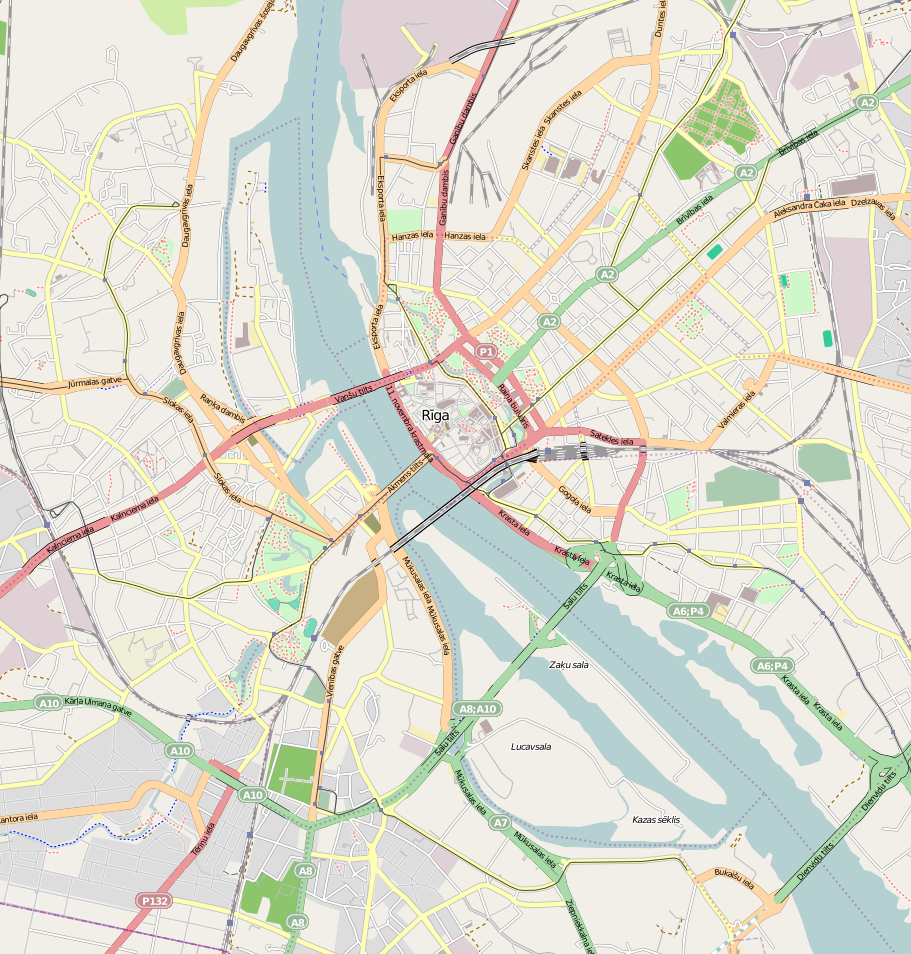
- Location within Riga
- 56°58′3.95″N 24°8′12.60″E
- Location: Riga
- Country: Latvia
- Denomination: Eastern Orthodox

Ascension Church (Latvian: Kristus Debesbraukšanas pareizticīgo baznīca) is an Eastern Orthodox church in Riga, the capital of Latvia. The church is situated at the address 2 Mēness Street. Services are held in the Latvian language.
