= Episcopal Church of the Ascension (Sierra Madre, California) =

Historic church in California, United States

- U.S. National Register of Historic Places
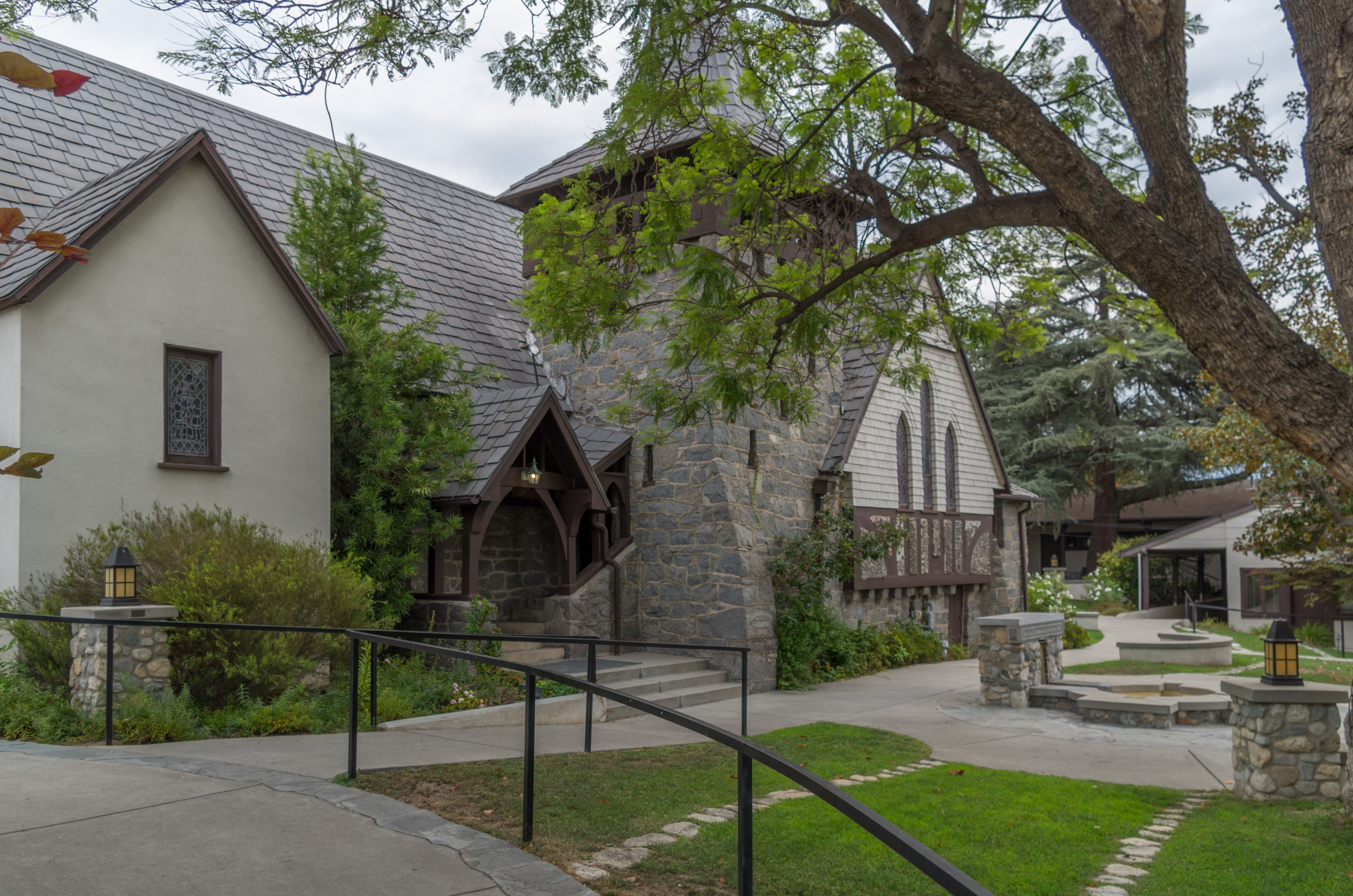

- Location within the Los Angeles metropolitan area Location within California Location within the United States
- Location: 25 E. Laurel Ave., Sierra Madre, California
- Coordinates: 34°9′57″N 118°3′8″W
- Built: 1888
- Architect: Ernest Coxhead
- NRHP reference No.: 77000303
- Added to NRHP: August 19, 1977

The Episcopal Church of the Ascension in Sierra Madre, California is an historic church that was built in 1888. It was listed on the National Register of Historic Places in 1977. It is site #7 on Sierra Madre designated historical landmarks list. There are forty-eight properties listed on Sierra Madre's Designated Historical Properties List.

== Current use ==
The Episcopal Church of the Ascension is still an active parish in the Episcopal Diocese of Los Angeles.

== History ==
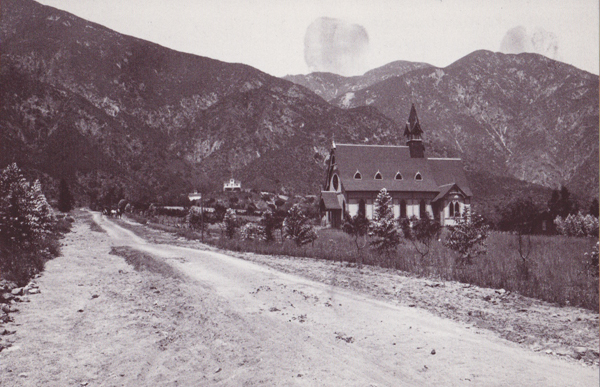
Original 1887 Wooden Episcopal Church of the Ascension in Sierra Madre

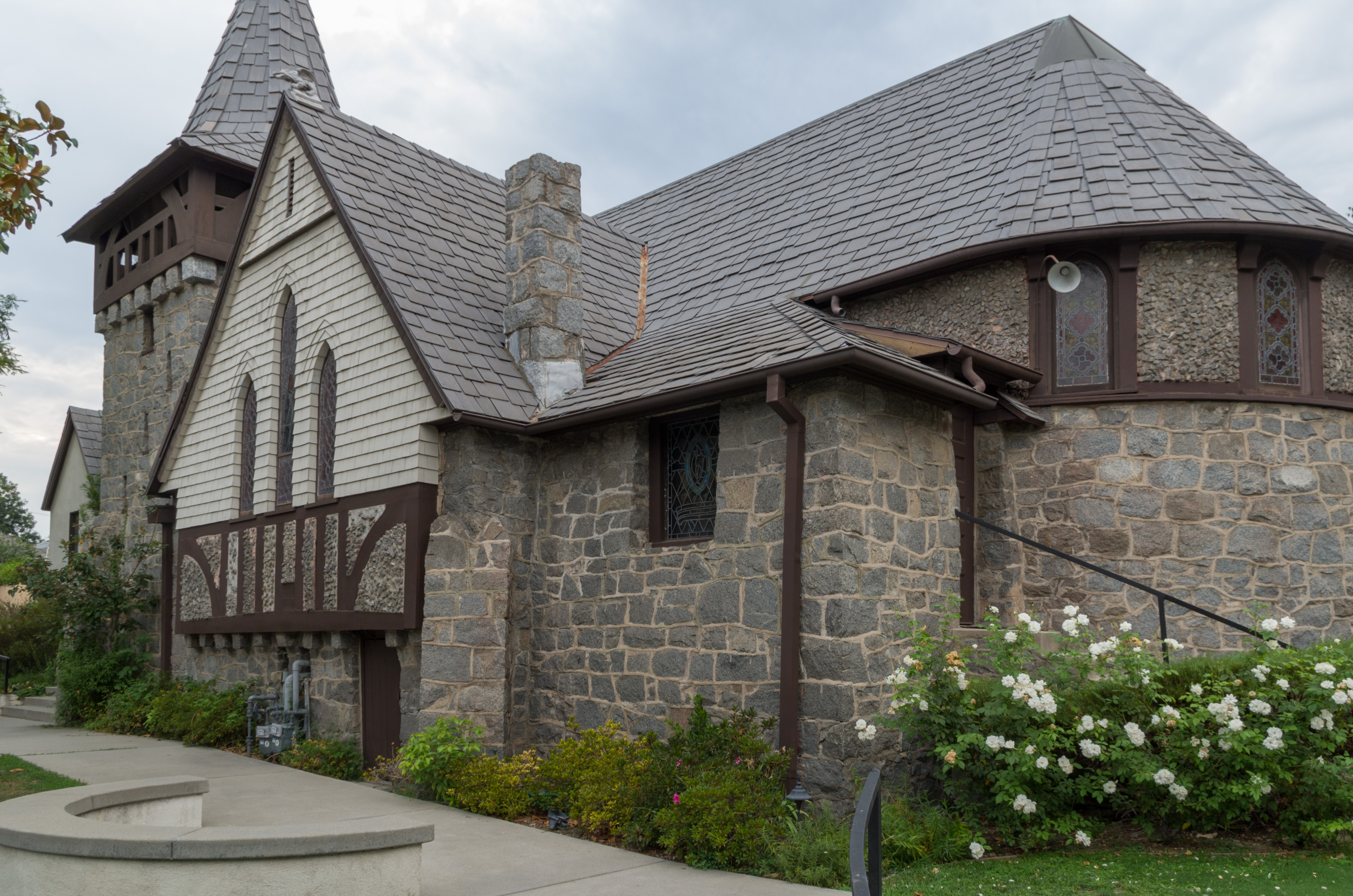
Episcopal Church of the Ascension in Sierra Madre

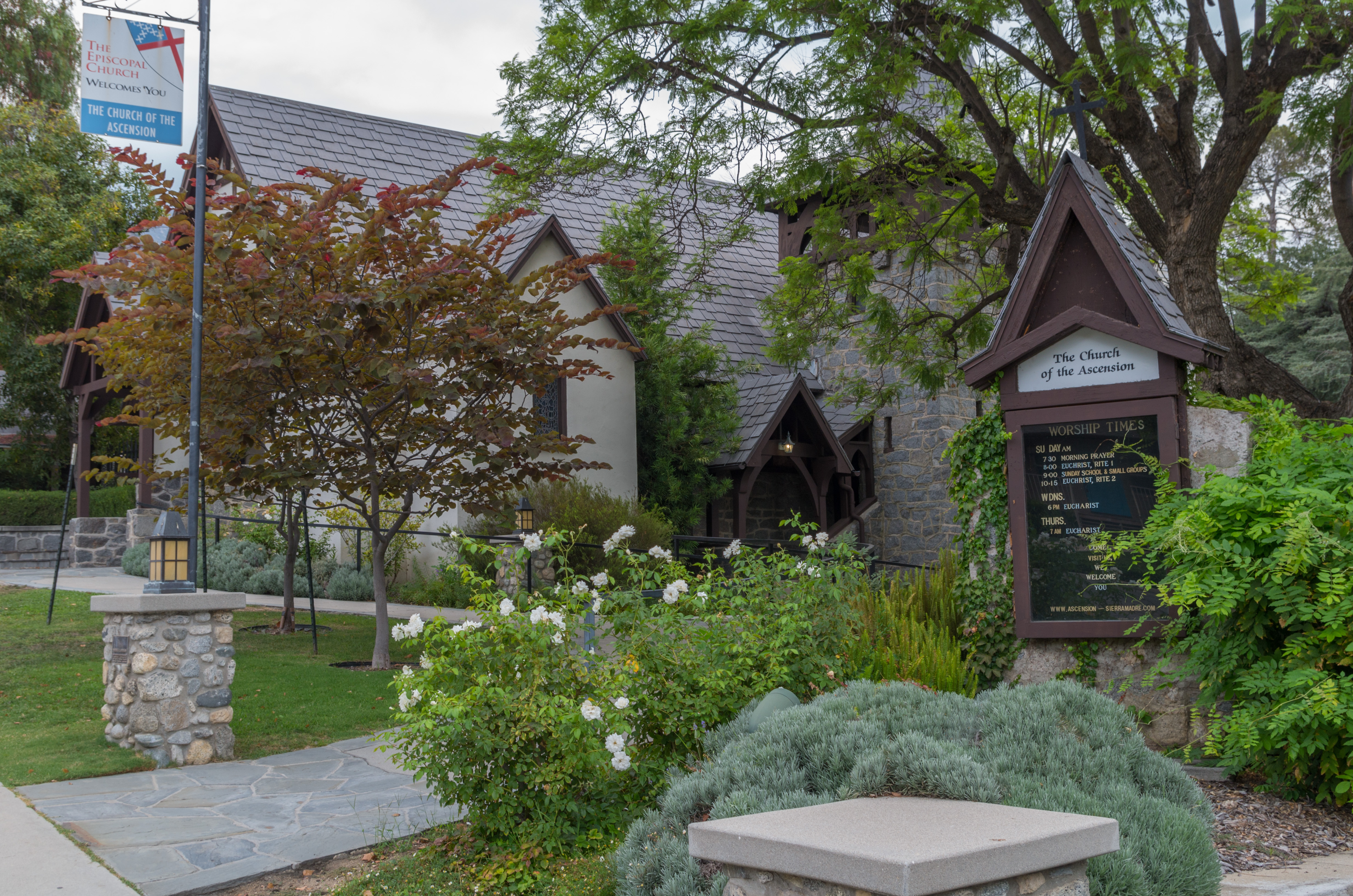
Episcopal Church of the Ascension Sierra Madre

The Original 1885 Wooden Episcopal Church of the Ascension in Sierra Madre was destroyed by a windstorm in October 1887.

The church was used as a location in John Carpenter's 1980 horror movie The Fog.

== See also ==
- Episcopal Church of the Ascension (disambiguation)
- Old North Church in Sierra Madre, California
