= Church of the Ascension (Clearwater, Florida) =

Coordinates: 27.958171°N 82.803024°W

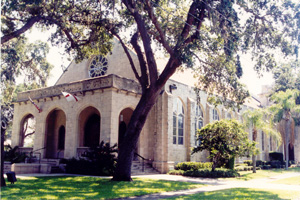
- Church of the Ascension
- Location: 701 Orange Avenue, Clearwater, Florida
- Country: United States
- Denomination: Episcopal Church in the United States of America
- Website: http://www.churchofascension.org/

History
- Founded: 1885

Architecture
- Style: Gothic Revival
- Completed: 1925

Administration
- Diocese: Southwest Florida

Clergy
- Bishop: The Rt. Rev. Dabney T. Smith
- Rector: The Rev. Dr. Jim Sorvillo

Church of the Ascension is an Episcopal church in Clearwater, Florida. Its name comes from the words of one of the founders, "It was a miracle the way our church did ascend from our prayers". The church is located in the Harbor Oaks Residential District and is considered by many locally to be an important historic site. The church also has a 75-foot-tall (23 m) carillon, the Betty Jane Dimmitt Memorial Carillon, which has 49 bells and is one of just four such towers in the state of Florida.

In addition to the organ and the carillon, the church's current building, built in gothic style around 1925, features 28 stained glass windows (the oldest of which dates back to 1895) which feature, among other things, the Ascension of Jesus Christ (in a large window over the altar), the Ten Commandments, the parable of the Good Shepherd, the parable of the Lost Son, and the "war window" where a candle is lit in remembrance of the Iraq war. Many have gone to pray at this window for loved ones involved in the war.

== History ==
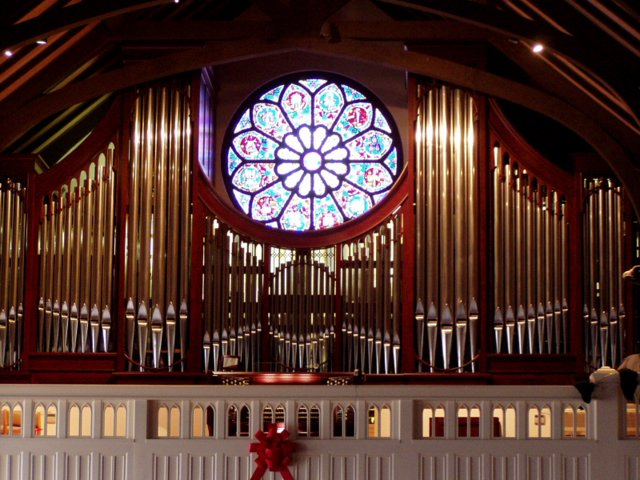
3,235-pipe Gallery Organ at Church of the Ascension

According to its website, the church was founded 1885, when sixteen people met in a home to organize a new church. As the church grew the still small congregation moved the church into several other buildings before it was moved to its current location near downtown Clearwater. The church nave was extended later to its current size to include a balcony (where the organ console sits) and an increase in the seating capacity.

When Saint Paul's School first opened in 1968, classes were housed at the church.

In 1982, church member Larry Dimmit donated the Betty Jane Dimmit Memorial Carillon, composed of 49 cast bronze bells from the Royal Eijsbouts bell foundry in the Netherlands, which was installed on Dec. 5 of that year. The bells are now played at least weekly before or after church services, although in the 2001 Christmas season, the bells were played daily in remembrance of the September 11, 2001 attacks.

In 2003 the church installed a new pipe organ by Orgues Létourneau, which is the ninth largest in Florida (by number of ranks) with 4,182 pipes (3,235 in the Gallery and 947 in the Chancel) and 78 ranks.

The church currently lists approximately 285 families as members. As of 2006, Carol Schwenke, the first woman to be ordained a priest in the Episcopal Diocese of Southwest Florida, serves as Sunday assistant.

== Unique events ==
The church is unique in Pinellas County for offering The Alpha Marriage Course.

== Outreach ==
The church is a focal point for several outreach programs.

- SHARE (Self-Help and Resource Exchange) program
- RCS (Religious Community Services)
- Habitat for Humanity - The church in September 2006 helped fund and has begun to help build a house in Clearwater

The church also participates in various Episcopal charities, such as the Episcopal Relief and Development program. The church regularly participates in "mission trips;" in 2004 and 2005, parishioners went to the Dominican Republic to help reconstruct a church, and from 1999–2002, the Ascension senior youth group went to the Wind River Indian Reservation to repair a decrepit fellowship center.
