= Church of the Ascension (Frankfort, Kentucky) =

- 38°11′57.40″N 84°52′45.27″W
- Location: Frankfort, Kentucky
- Country: United States
- Denomination: Episcopal Church

History
- Founded: 1836

The Church of the Ascension is an Episcopal Church located in the heart of Frankfort, the U.S. state of Kentucky's historic district at 311 Washington Street. It was organized in 1836.

The church is governed by a vestry of 8 to 10 members, presided over by the Senior Warden and the Rector. Vestry members are elected during an annual meeting of all of the congregation.

Services are conducted by one or two priests and a deacon. Four to six children serve as acolytes in services, carrying the cross and torches.

Organizations include the Altar Guild, which sets up for services, takes care of the sanctuary, and decorates; the vestry; the Youth Group; Sunday School; ECW, the women's association; and the Men's Club, which cooks breakfast on Sundays and helps raise money and care for the church.
