= Ascension of Jesus =

Biblical episode

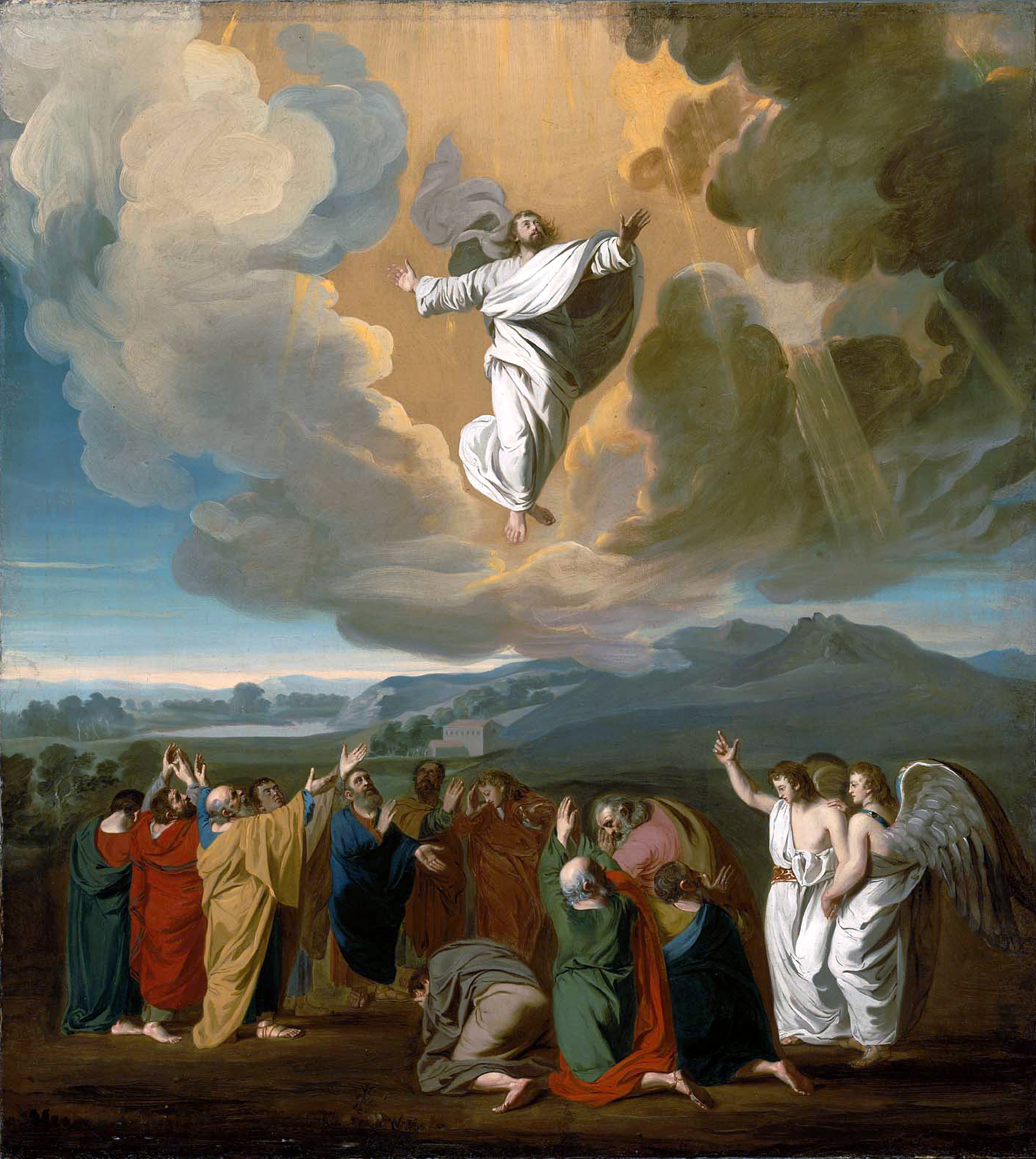
Jesus' ascension to Heaven depicted by John Singleton Copley in Ascension (1775)

The Ascension of Jesus (anglicized from the Vulgate Latin: ascensio Iesu, lit. 'ascent of Jesus') is the Christian and Islamic belief that Jesus ascended to Heaven. Christian doctrine, as reflected in the major Christian creeds and confessional statements, holds that Jesus ascended after his resurrection, where he was exalted as Lord and Christ, sitting at the right hand of God. Islamic doctrine holds that Jesus directly ascended to heaven without dying or being resurrected.

The Gospels and other New Testament writings imply resurrection and exaltation as a single event. The ascension is "more assumed than described", and only Luke and Acts contain direct accounts of it, but with different chronologies. (Note: In Luke, the ascension seems to be on the same day as the resurrection. In Acts, Jesus' ascension is situated on the fortieth day counting from the resurrection in the presence of eleven of his apostles, thereby putting a limit on the number of resurrection appearances, and effectively excluding Paul's conversion experience from the bona fide resurrection appearances.)

In Christian art, the ascending Jesus is often shown blessing an earthly group below him, signifying the entire Church. The Feast of the Ascension is celebrated on the 40th day of Easter, always a Thursday; some Orthodox traditions have a different calendar up to a month later than in the Western tradition. The Lutheran churches and the Anglican Communion continue to observe the Feast of the Ascension. Certain Nonconformist churches, such as the Plymouth Brethren, do not observe the feast.

== Biblical accounts ==
Although the ascension is an important article of faith in Christianity, only Luke and Acts contain direct accounts of it. In the shorter ending of Mark, in Matthew, and in John, it is only implied or alluded to. The Gospels do not picture resurrection and ascension as clearly separated in time. Other New Testament writings also imply resurrection and exaltation as a single event.

Various epistles (Romans 8:34, Ephesians 1:19–20, Colossians 3:1, Philippians 2:9–11, 1 Timothy 3:16, and 1 Peter 3:21–22) refer to an ascension without specifying details, seeming, like Luke–Acts and John, to equate it with the post-resurrection "exaltation" of Jesus to the right hand of God.

The ascension is detailed in both Luke and Acts, a pair of works ascribed to the same author, Luke the Evangelist:

- Luke 24:51: Jesus leads the eleven remaining disciples to Bethany, a village on the Mount of Olives, and instructs them to remain in Jerusalem until the coming of the Holy Spirit: "And it came to pass, while he blessed them, he parted from them, and was carried up into heaven. And they worshipped him, and returned to Jerusalem with great joy."
- Acts 1 (Acts 1:1–9): Jesus tells the disciples to remain in Jerusalem and await the coming of the Holy Spirit; he is then taken up from the disciples in their sight, a cloud hides him from view, and two men in white appear to tell them that he will return "in the same way you have seen him go into heaven."

Luke and Acts appear to describe the same event but present quite different chronologies, the gospel placing it on the same day as the resurrection and Acts forty days afterwards; various proposals have been put forward to resolve the contradiction, but none have been found satisfactory. According to Dunn, the author of Acts separated the resurrection and ascension to put a limit on the number of resurrection appearances, effectively excluding Paul's conversion experience from the bona fide resurrection appearances. Zwiep argues that Jesus was originally believed to have been exalted with his ascension to heaven and seated at the right hand of God with his resurrection until the late first century where he argues the exaltation had been separated from the resurrection, and moved to a final ascension into heaven after his appearances on earth. Other scholars note that the biblical authors tended to conflate or compress different events and narrate them as one which was a literary theme seen in other ancient biographies to improve the narrative flow. Such scholars caution against a strictly chronological reading.

John's Gospel has three references to ascension in Jesus' own words: "No one has ascended into heaven but he who descended from heaven, the Son of Man" (John 3:13); "What if you [the disciples] were to see the Son of Man ascending where he was before?" (John 6:62); and to Mary Magdalene after his resurrection, "Do not hold me, for I have not yet ascended to my Father..." (John 20:17). In the first and second Jesus is claiming to be the apocalyptic "one like a Son of Man" of Daniel 7; the last has mystified commentators – why should Mary be prohibited from touching the risen but not yet ascended Christ, while Thomas is later invited to do so?

The longer ending of Mark describes an ascension, but it may be a later addition to the original version of that gospel.

== Views on the Ascension ==
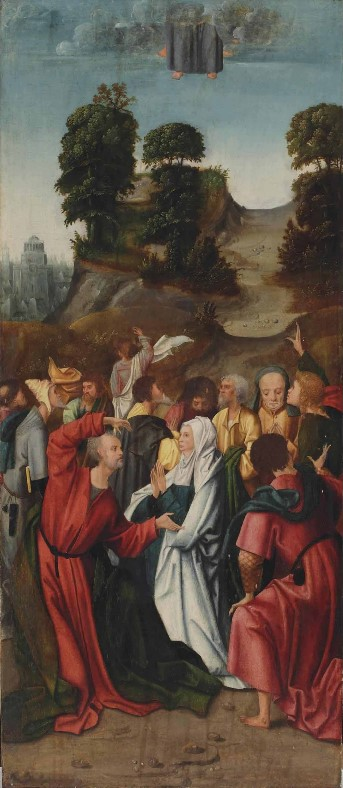
Ascension of Christ by Adriaen van Overbeke, c. 1510–1520

=== Background ===
Ascension stories were fairly common around the time of Jesus and the evangelists, signifying the deification of a noteworthy person (usually a Roman Emperor), and in Judaism as an indication of divine approval. Another function of heavenly ascent was as a mode of divine revelation reflected in Greco-Roman, early Jewish, and early Christian literary sources, in which particular individuals with prophetic or revelatory gifts are said to have experienced a heavenly journey during which they learned cosmic and divine secrets.

Figures familiar to Jews would have included Enoch (from the Book of Genesis and a popular non-Biblical work called 1 Enoch); the 5th-century sage Ezra; Baruch the companion of the prophet Jeremiah (from a work called 2 Baruch, in which Baruch is promised he will ascend to heaven after forty days); Levi the ancestor of priests; the Teacher of Righteousness from the Qumran community; the prophet Elijah (from 2 Kings); Moses, who was deified on entering heaven; and the children of Job, who according to the Testament of Job ascended to heaven following their resurrection from the dead.

Non-Jewish readers would have been familiar with the case of the emperor Augustus, whose ascent was witnessed by Senators; Romulus the founder of Rome, who, like Jesus, was taken to heaven in a cloud; the Greek hero Heracles (Hercules); and others.

=== Christian theology ===
In Christian theology, the death, resurrection, and exaltation of Jesus are the most important events, and a foundation of the Christian faith. The early followers of Jesus believed that God had vindicated Jesus after his death, as reflected in the stories about his resurrection, ascension, and exaltation. The early followers of Jesus soon believed that Jesus was raised as first of the dead, taken into Heaven, and exalted, taking the seat at the right hand of God in Heaven, as stated in the Apostles' Creed: "He ascended into heaven, and is seated at the right hand of God the Father almighty." Psalm 110 (Psalms 110:1) played an essential role in this interpretation of Jesus' death and the resurrection appearances: "The Lord said to my Lord, "Sit at my right hand until I make your enemies your footstool." It provided an interpretative frame for Jesus' followers to make sense of his death and the resurrection appearances.

This understanding is summarized by the theologian Justus Knecht who wrote: "Our Lord went up Body and Soul into heaven in the sight of His apostles, by His own power, to take possession of His glory, and to be our Advocate and Mediator in heaven with the Father. He ascended as Man, as Head of the redeemed, and has prepared a dwelling in heaven for all those who follow in His steps (Sixth article of the Creed)."

=== Cosmology ===
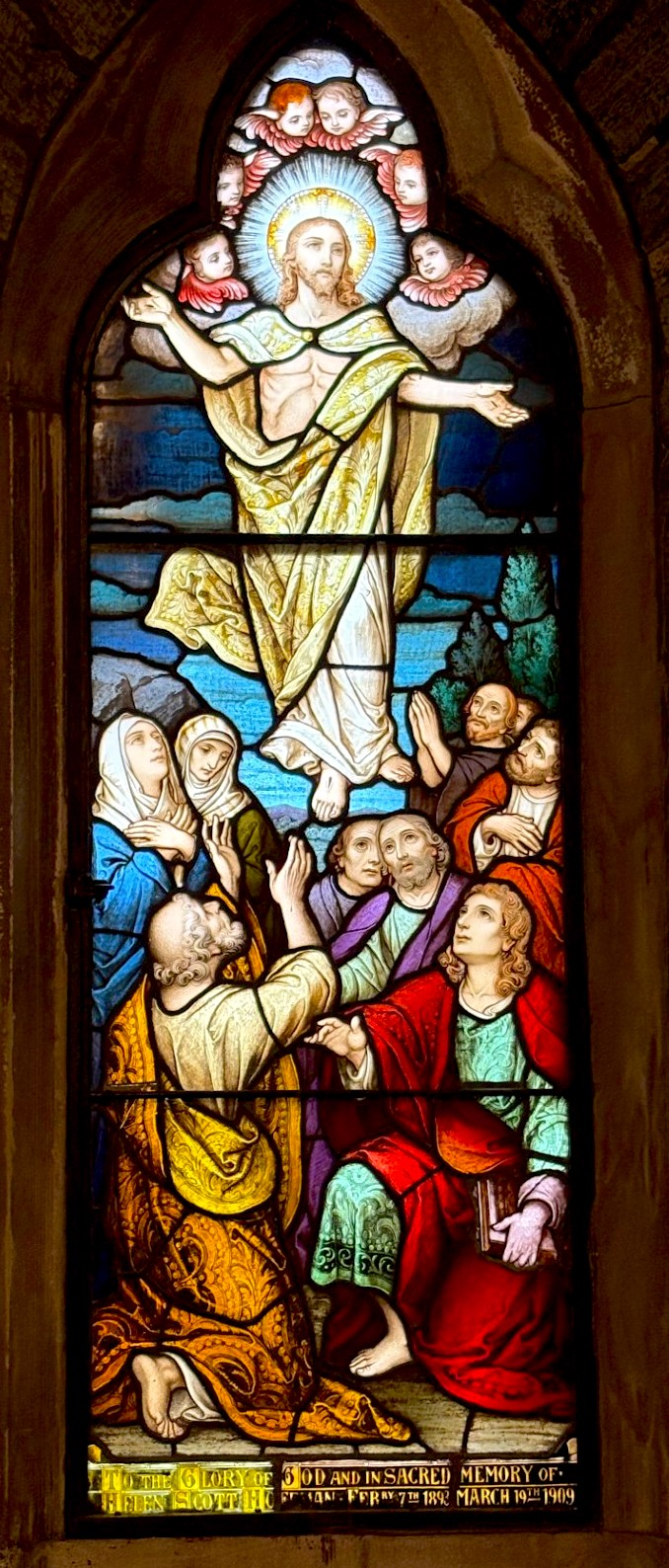
Stained glass window showing the Ascension of Jesus, at Church of the Good Shepherd (Rosemont, Pennsylvania)

The cosmology of the author of Luke–Acts reflects the beliefs of his age, which envisioned a three-part cosmos with the heavens above, an Earth centered on Jerusalem in the middle, and the underworld below. Heaven was separated from the Earth by the firmament, the visible sky, a solid inverted bowl where God's palace sat on pillars in the celestial sea. Humans looking up from Earth saw the floor of Heaven, made of clear blue lapis-lazuli (Exodus 24:9–10), as was God's throne (Ezekiel 1:26). According to Dunn, "the typical mind-set and worldview of the time conditioned what was actually seen and how the recording of such seeings was conceptualized," and "departure into heaven could only be conceived in terms of 'being taken up ', a literal ascension."

In modern times, a literal reading of the ascension-stories has become problematic, due to the differences between the pre-scientific cosmology of the times of Jesus, and the scientific worldview that leaves no place for a Heaven above earth. Theologian James Dunn describes the Ascension as at best a puzzle and at worst an embarrassment for an age that no longer conceives of a physical Heaven located above the Earth. Similarly, in the words of McGill University's Douglas Farrow, in modern times the ascension is seen less as the climax of the mystery of Christ than as "something of an embarrassment in the age of the telescope and the space probe," an "idea [that] conjures up an outdated cosmology."

Yet, according to Dunn, a sole focus on this disparity is beside the real importance of Jesus' ascension, namely the resurrection and subsequent exaltation of Jesus. Farrow notes that, already in the third century, the ascension-story was read by Origen in a mystical way, as an "ascension of the mind rather than of the body," representing one of two basic ascension theologies. The real problem is the fact that Jesus is both present and absent, an ambiguity which points to a "something more" to which the Eucharist gives entry. (Note: According to Farrow, this ambiguity of absence and presence poses central christological and theological questions concerning the identity of the church and its relation to past (death and resurrection) and future (second coming) events, and to the present world, in which it is situated, but from which it is also different, through "its mysterious union with one whose life, though lived for the world, involves a genuine break with it.")

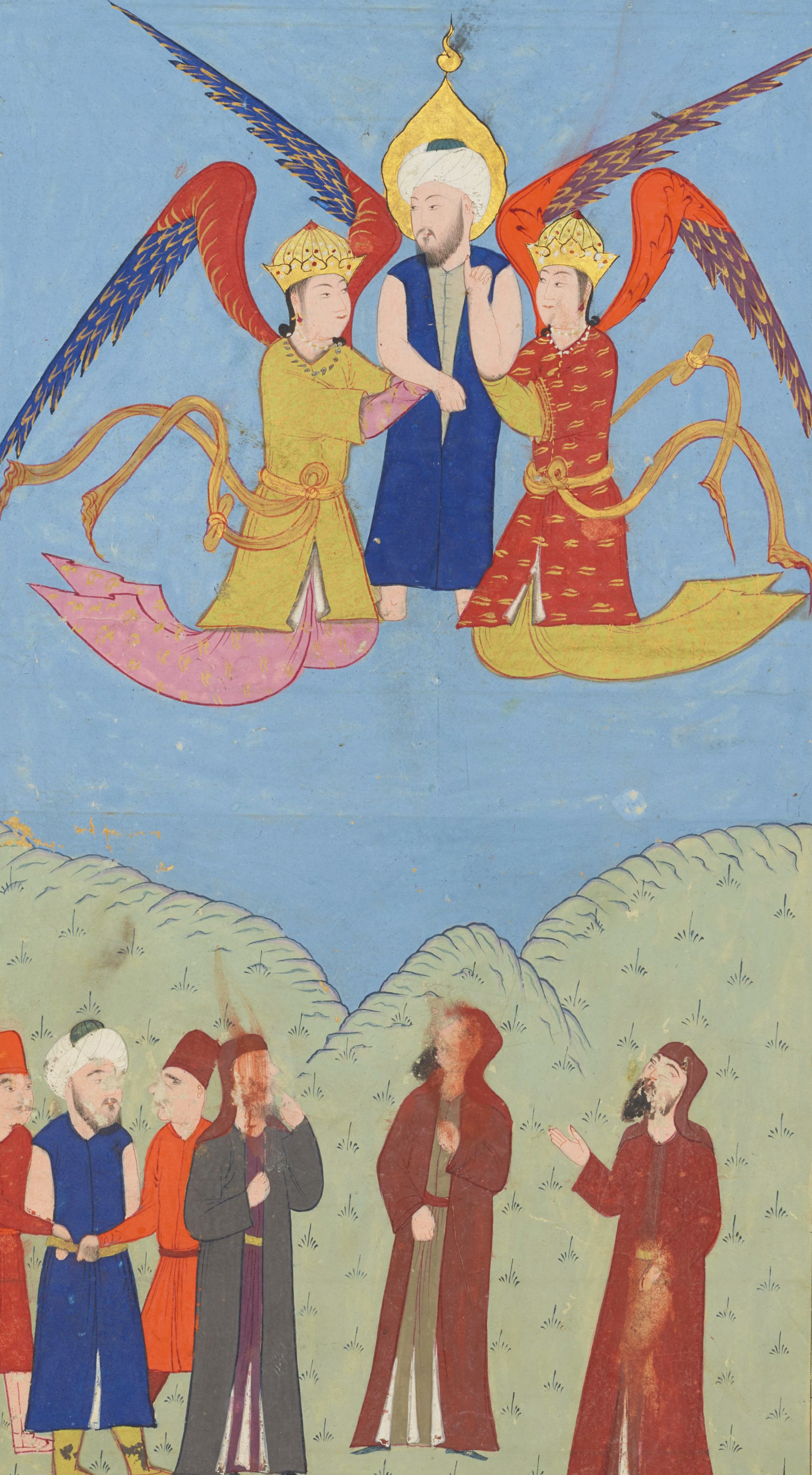
Islamic miniature of Isa's ascension.

=== Islam ===
The same doctrine takes on another meaning for Muslims: most Islamic scholars hold that Jesus, the penultimate prophet of Islam, was not crucified or resurrected but his body directly ascended.

== Liturgy: Feast of the Ascension ==
Orthodox Feast of the Ascension

The Feast of the Ascension is a major feast day of the Christian liturgical year, along with the Passion, Easter, Pentecost, and Christmas. Ascension Day is traditionally celebrated on the sixth Thursday after Easter Sunday, the fortieth day from Easter day, although some Catholic provinces have moved the observance to the following Sunday to facilitate the obligation to attend Mass. Saint Jerome held that it was of apostolic origin, but in fact the Ascension was originally part of Pentecost (the coming of the Holy Spirit), and developed as a separate celebration only slowly from the late 4th century onward. In the Catholic tradition it begins with a three-day "rogation" to ask for God's mercy, and the feast itself includes a procession of torches and banners symbolising Christ's journey to the Mount of Olives and entry into Heaven, the extinguishing of the Paschal candle, and an all-night vigil; white is the liturgical colour. The feast was retained at the Protestant Reformation. It continues to be observed in Lutheran, Anglican, Methodist, and most Reformed churches. Most of the Eastern Christian tradition (Eastern and Oriental Orthodox and some Eastern Catholic Churches, and the Church of the East), based on the Julian calendar, has a slightly different computation, up to a month later than in the Western tradition. Other denominations, such as the Plymouth Brethren and Quakers, do not celebrate it as they do not adhere to the traditional Christian calendar of feasts.

One of the Ascension hymns is Christ fuhr gen Himmel.

== In Christian art ==
The Ascension of Jesus has been a frequent subject in Christian art. By the 6th century, the iconography of the Ascension had been established and by the 9th century, ascension scenes were being depicted on domes of churches. The Rabbula Gospels (c. 586) include some of the earliest images of the ascension. Many ascension scenes have two parts, an upper (Heavenly) part and a lower (earthly) part. The ascending Christ may be carrying a resurrection cross-banner or make a sign of benediction with his right hand. The blessing gesture by Christ with his right hand is directed towards the earthly group below him and signifies that he is blessing the entire Church. In the left hand, he may be holding a Gospel or a scroll, signifying teaching and preaching.

The Eastern Orthodox portrayal of the ascension is a major metaphor for the mystical nature of the Church. In many Eastern icons, the Virgin Mary is placed at the center of the scene in the earthly part of the depiction, with her hands raised towards Heaven, often accompanied by various Apostles. The upwards-looking depiction of the earthly group matches the Eastern liturgy on the Feast of the Ascension: "Come, let us rise and turn our eyes and thoughts high ..."

=== Olivet and the Chapel of the Ascension ===
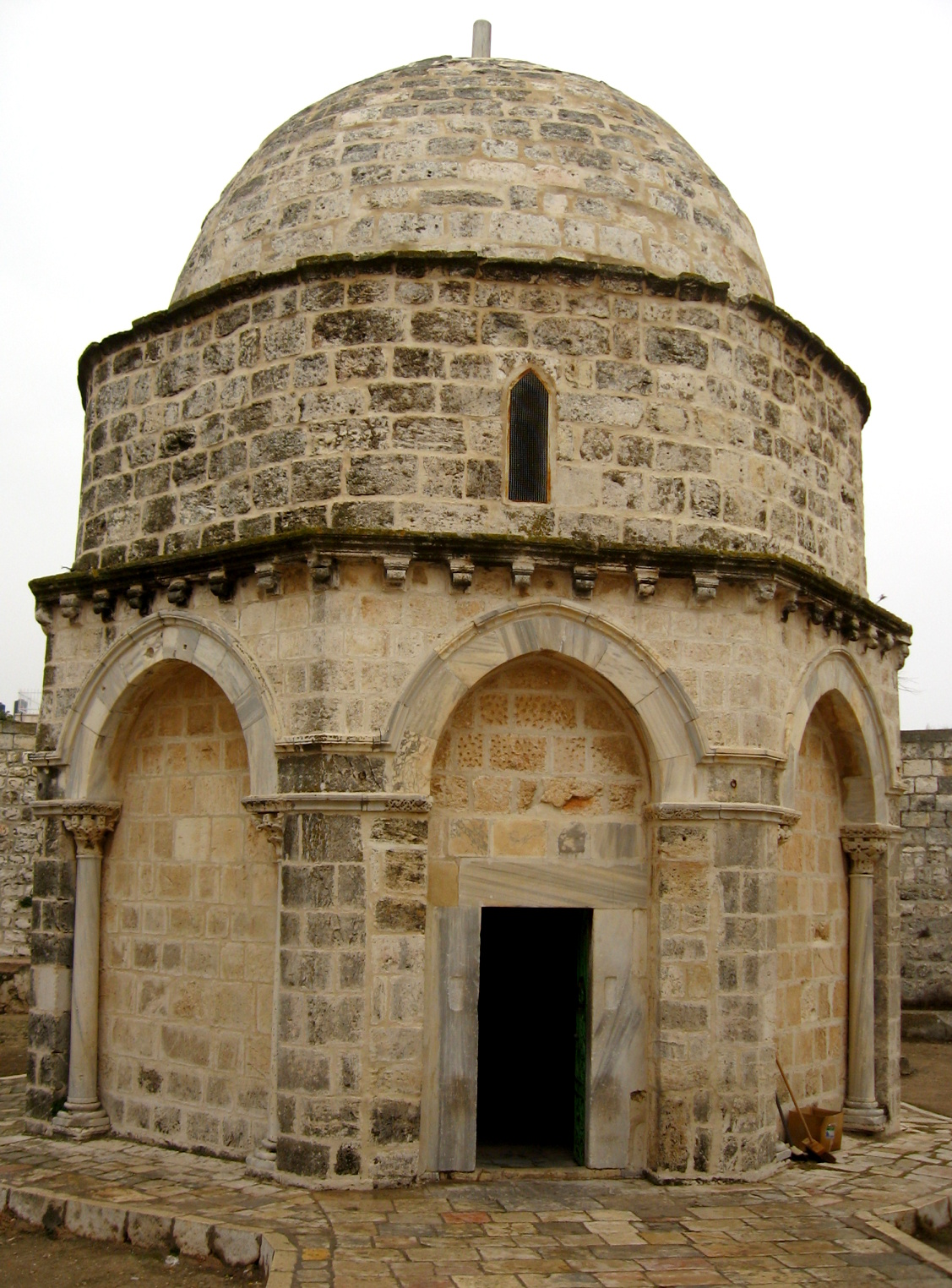
The Ascension aedicule

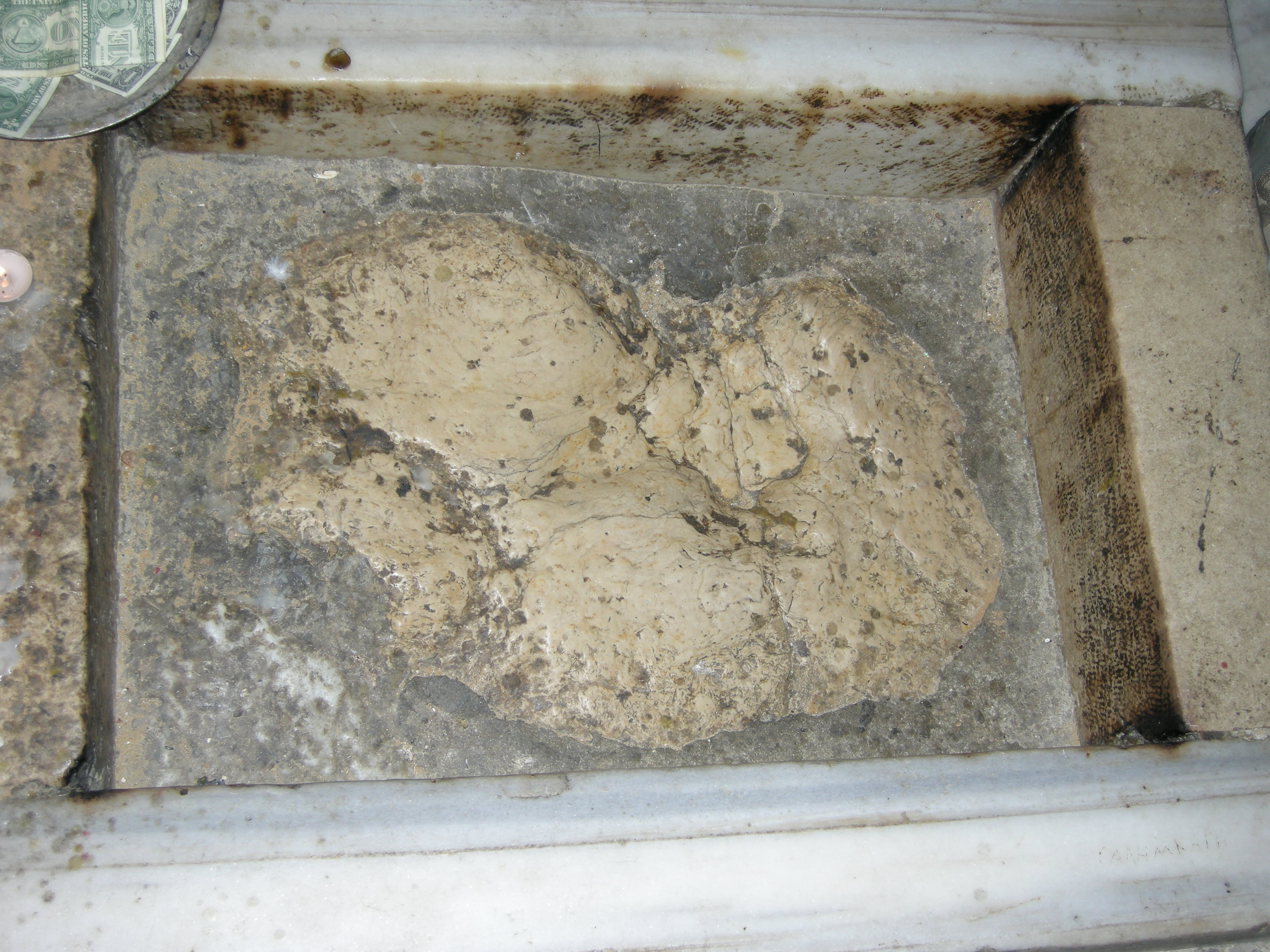
Close-up of the Rock of the Ascension inside the Ascension aedicule

The traditional site of the ascension is the Mount of Olives, on which the village of Bethany sits. Before the conversion of Constantine the Great in 312 AD, early Christians honoured the ascension of Christ in a cave on the Mount, and by 384 the ascension was venerated on the present site, uphill from the cave.

Around the year 390 a wealthy Roman woman named Poimenia financed construction of the original church called "Eleona Basilica" (elaion in Greek means "olive garden", from elaia "olive tree", and has an oft-mentioned similarity to eleos meaning "mercy"). This church was destroyed by Sassanid Persians in 614. It was subsequently rebuilt, destroyed, and rebuilt again by the Crusaders. This final church was later destroyed by Muslims, leaving only a 12×12 metre octagonal structure (called a martyrium – "memorial" – or "aedicule") that remains to this day. The site was ultimately acquired by two emissaries of Saladin in the year 1198 and has remained in the possession of the Islamic Waqf of Jerusalem ever since. The Russian Orthodox Church also maintains a convent of the ascension on the top of the Mount of Olives.

=== Gallery ===
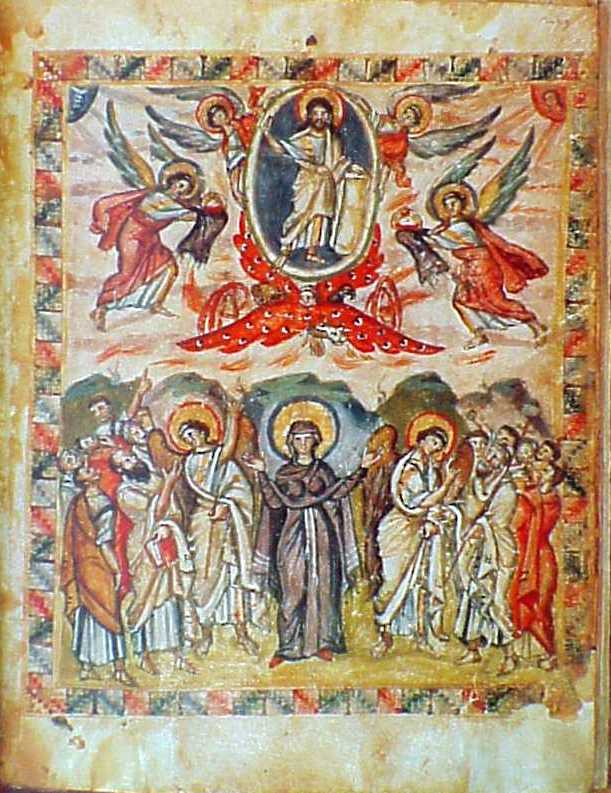
Rabbula Gospels
6th century

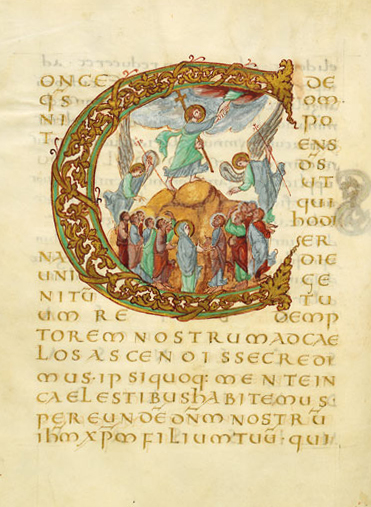
Drogo Sacramentary
c. 850

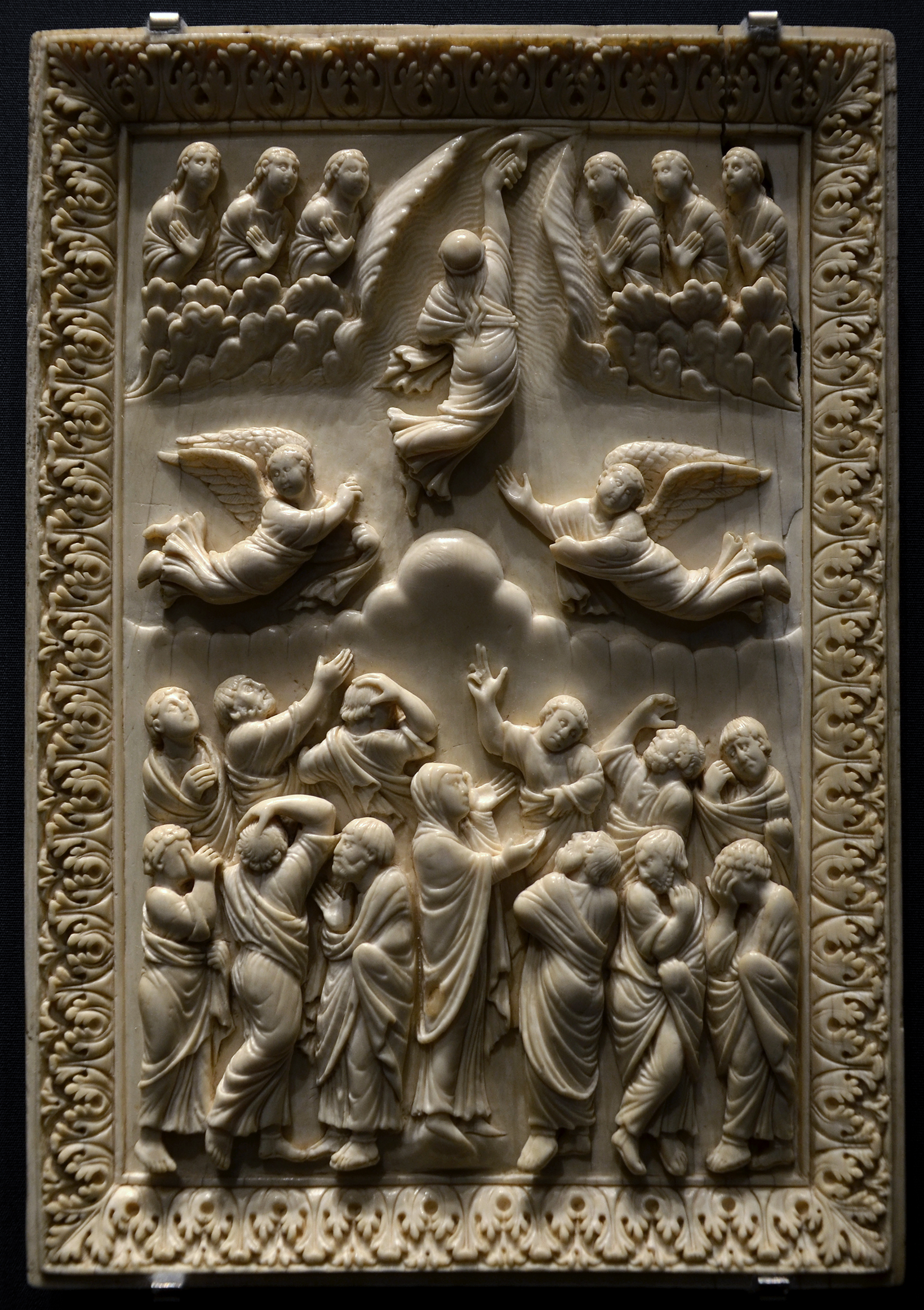
Ivory relief book cover
late 10th century

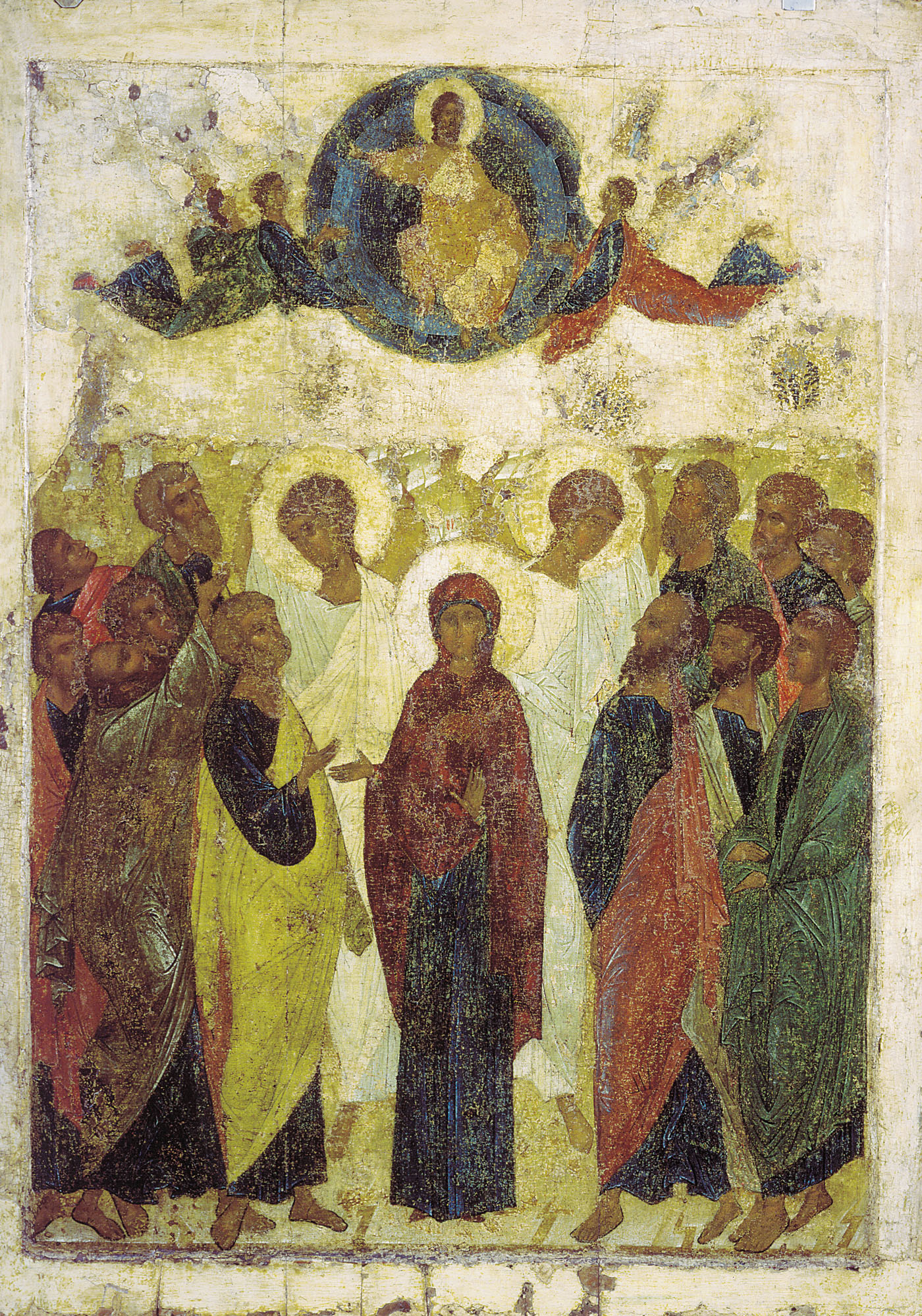
Andrei Rublev
1408

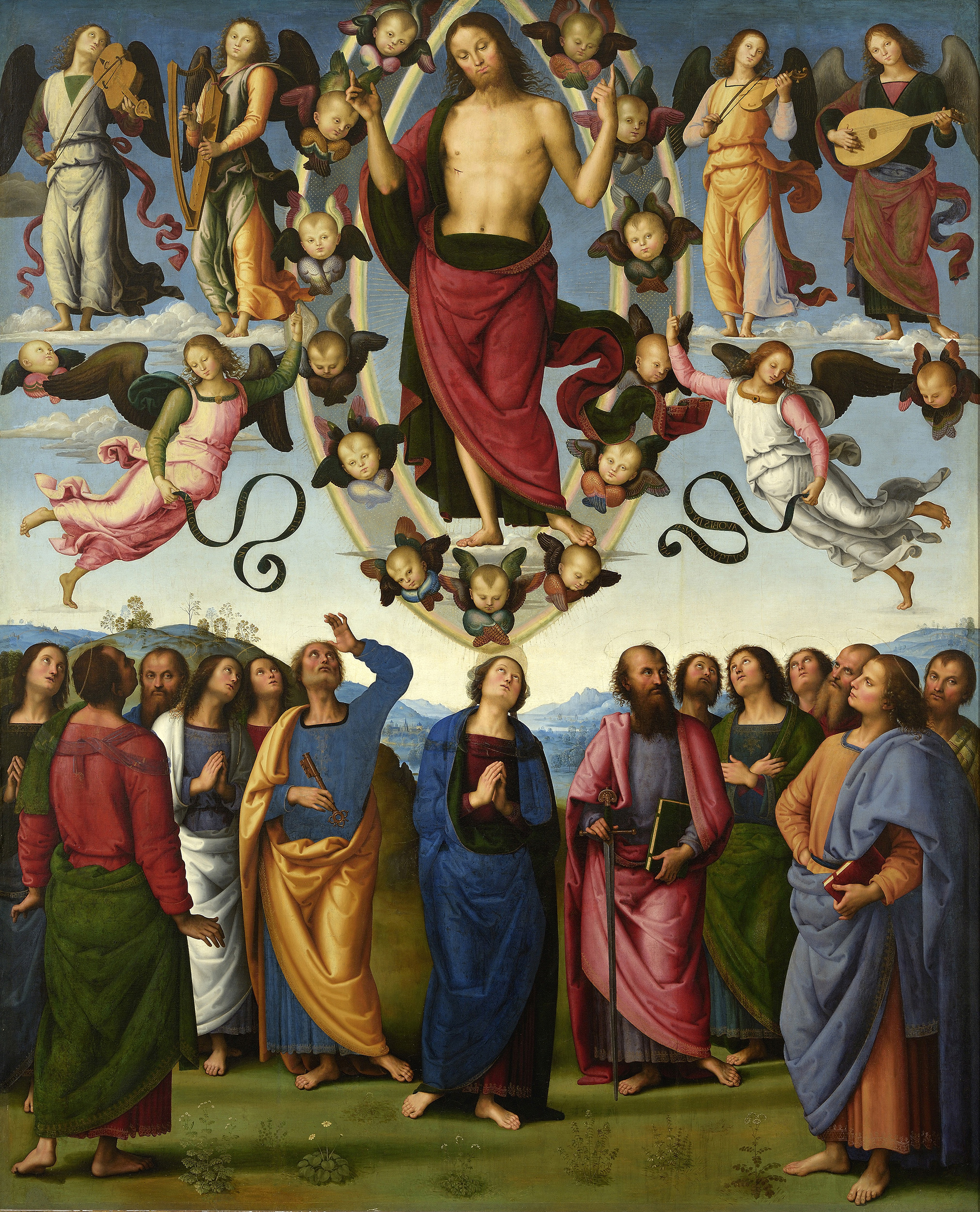
Pietro Perugino
1496–1500

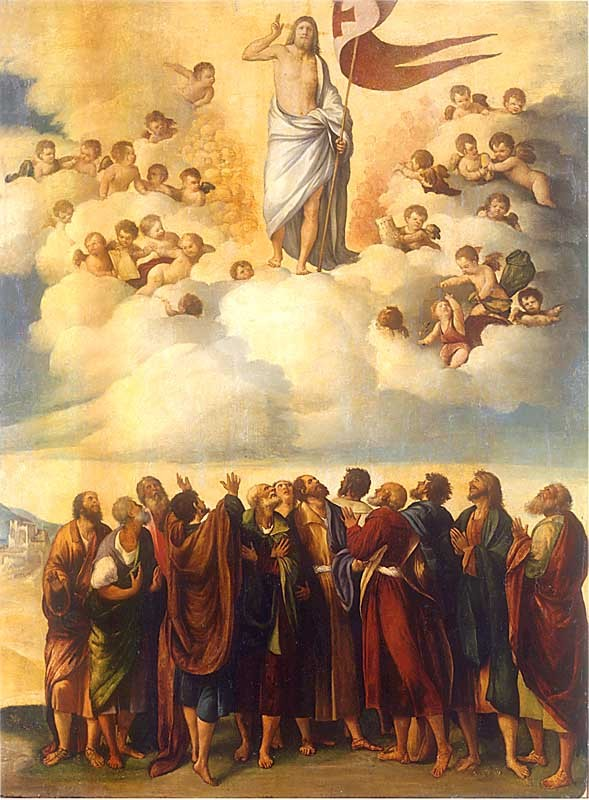
The Ascension, Dosso Dossi, 16th century.

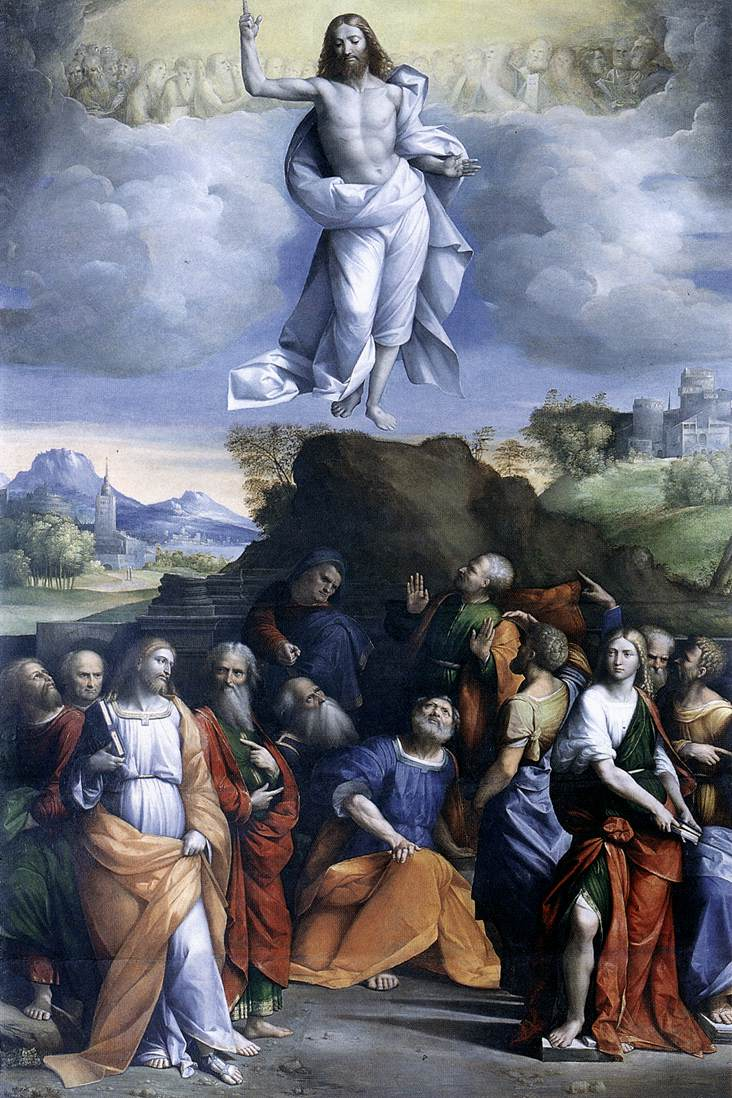
Garofalo
1520

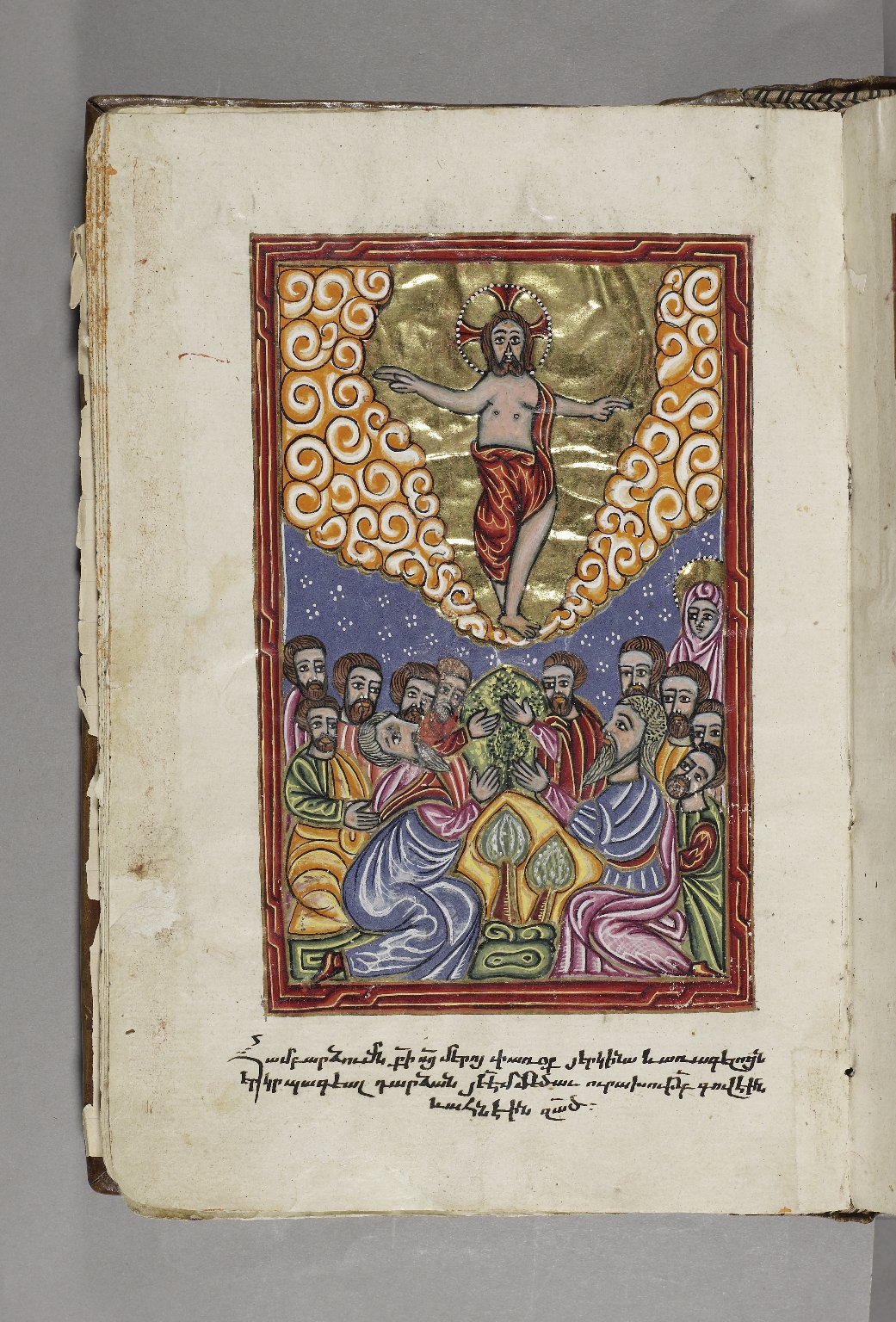
Armenian Gospel manuscript
1609

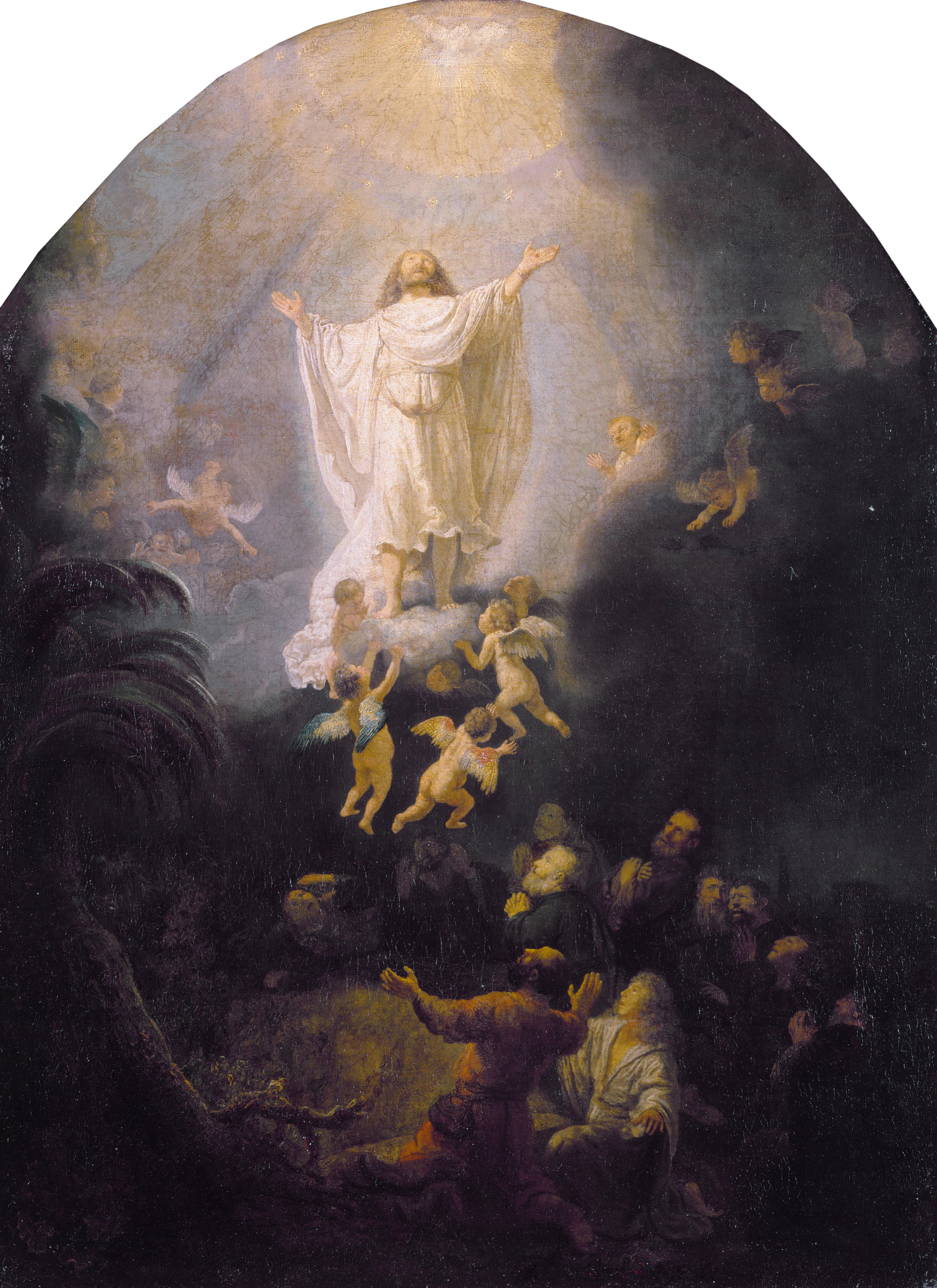
Rembrandt
1636

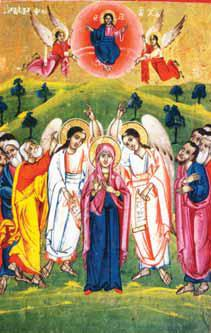
Macedonian icon, Bitola, Macedonia
19th century

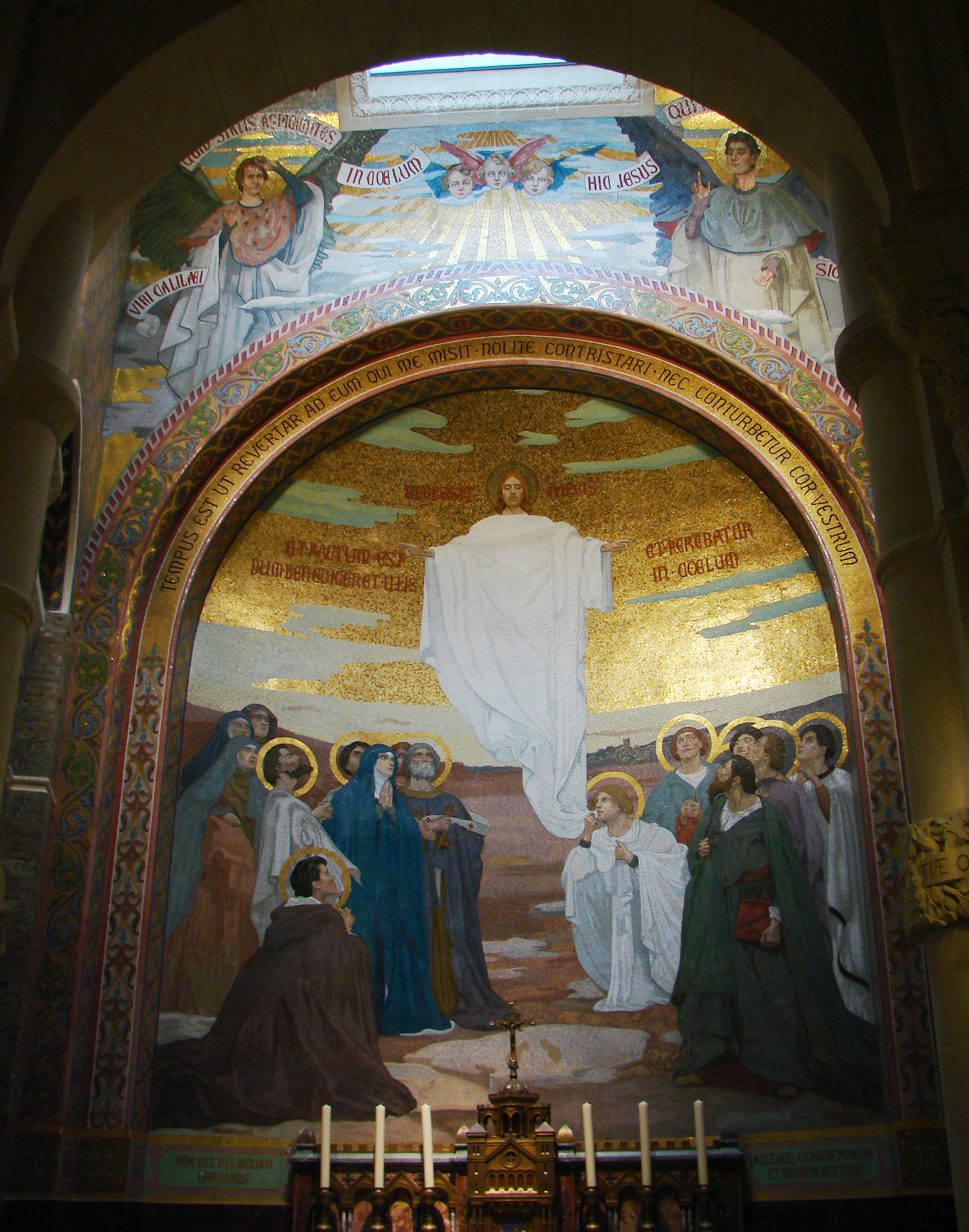
Rosary Basilica, Lourdes
19th century

== See also ==
- Ascension Parish
- Assumption of Mary
- Chronology of Jesus
- Church of the Ascension (disambiguation)
- Entering Heaven Alive
- Life of Jesus in the New Testament
- Rapture
- Session of Christ
- Transfiguration of Jesus
- Book of Arda Viraf
